= Alfred Lester =

English actor and comedian

Lester in the 1900s

Alfred Lester (25 October 1870 – 6 May 1925), real name Alfred Edwin Leslie, was an English actor and comedian. Born into a theatrical family, he learnt his craft touring in melodramas, as a young man, but made his reputation as a comedian in musical comedy, music hall and, later, revue.

Lester's gloomy stage persona was seen to its quintessential comic effect in the long-running musical The Arcadians (1909) in which he delivered optimistic lyrics in a lugubrious manner. Among his other hit shows were The New Aladdin (1906), Havana (1908) and The Bing Boys Are Here (1916). His co-stars included George Grossmith Jr., Phyllis Dare, George Robey and Violet Lorraine.

Ill health brought Lester's career to a premature close, and he died of pneumonia at the age of fifty four.

== Early life and career ==
Lester was born in Preston, the son of the comedian Alfred Leslie and his wife, an actress who used her maiden name as her stage name, Annie Ross. Lester made his theatrical debut at the Theatre Royal, Nottingham, in the role of Little Willie Carlyle in East Lynne. He toured the provinces for several years playing in some comedies in roles such as Charles Middlewick in Our Boys, but the staples of the touring repertory were melodramas, including The Lights o' London, The Shaughraun and The Colleen Bawn. An obituarist suggested that "the melancholy he had thus learnt to bathe in never quite dried off him; he used to let it drip on the musical comedy and revue stages."

In 1905 Lester was engaged to play in a musical comedy, The Officers' Mess – or How They Got Out of It at Terry's Theatre, London, where he was spotted by Alfred Butt, who ran variety shows at the Palace Theatre. Lester made an immediate impression with his monologue "The Sceneshifter", in which a gloomy stagehand gives his ideas for the improvement and brightening of Hamlet. He was booked for further monologues and sketches by Butt, and in 1906 he appeared at the Gaiety Theatre in London as the Lost Constable in George Grossmith Jr.'s musical The New Aladdin, in which the reviewer in The Times judged his performance the funniest thing in the show. At the same theatre he played Nix, the bo'sun, in another musical Havana in 1908; again, his performance received critical praise as the best thing in the piece.

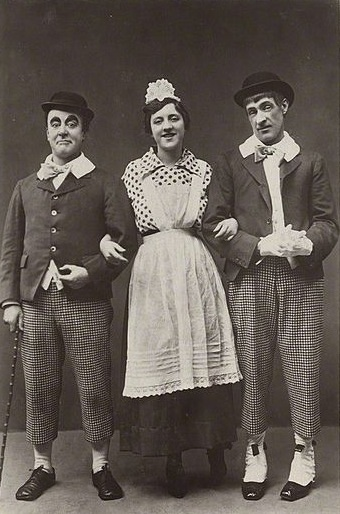
Lester (right) with George Robey and Violet Lorraine in The Bing Boys Are Here (1916)

The Arcadians in 1909 confirmed Lester's reputation as a leading West End performer. In a cast that included Phyllis Dare, Dan Rolyat and Florence Smithson, he was singled out by The Times, which found him "more hilariously melancholy than ever: the audience rocked to hear him sing that his motto was 'always merry and bright.'" In 1912 he played Vodka in The Grass Widows, and the following year was Byles in The Pearl Girl. Between runs in musical comedy he returned to his music hall monologues. Who's Who in the Theatre noted that Lester had "the unique distinction of being the only person who has been selected to appear at both the Royal Command Theatrical and Music Hall performances."

== Bing Boys and later years ==
In May 1915 Lester reprised his original role in a revival of The Arcadians, and among his most celebrated shows of the First World War years was a revue, The Bing Boys Are Here (1916) in which he and George Robey co-starred with Violet Lorraine. The Observer commented, "Nothing so funny in revue has ever been seen in London … the three together are almost too much to endure for three hours".

His later roles in musical comedy were Umpicof in Round the Map (1917), Hu-Du in Shanghai (1918), George in The Eclipse (1919) and Miggles in a revival of The Shop Girl (1920). He starred in four more revues: Pins and Needles (1921), Fun of the Fayre (1921), Rats (1923), and his final show, The Punch Bowl (1924). The Times considered the last, "with its brilliant changes of character in the various scenes, was technically perhaps better than anything he had ever done."

During the run of The Punch Bowl Lester was taken ill and had to leave the cast. Suffering from a chest complaint he was recommended to go to a warmer country, travelling by sea to spend some weeks in Morocco with friends. Feeling considerably better he began the overland journey home by train, but he was taken ill again en route and died of pneumonia at The Anglo-American Nursing Home, Madrid. He was cremated at Golders Green Crematorium on 27 May 1925 and buried at Kensal Green Cemetery the following day.
