= Soldiers of the King (film) =

- Directed by: Maurice Elvey
- Written by: Douglas Furber; Jack Hulbert; W. P. Lipscomb; J. O. C. Orton
- Produced by: Michael Balcon
- Starring: Cicely Courtneidge; Edward Everett Horton; Anthony Bushell; Dorothy Hyson
- Cinematography: Percy Strong; Leslie Rowson
- Edited by: R. E. Dearing; Ian Dalrymple
- Music by: Louis Levy
- Production company: Gainsborough Pictures
- Distributed by: Woolf & Freedman Film Service
- Release date: March 1933
- Running time: 80 minutes
- Country: United Kingdom
- Language: English

Soldiers of the King is a 1933 British historical comedy film directed by Maurice Elvey and starring Cicely Courtneidge, Edward Everett Horton and Anthony Bushell. It was Courtneidge's fourth film, and the first she appeared in without her husband Jack Hulbert. Courtneidge plays the matriarch of a music hall family, in a plot that switches between the Victorian era and the 1930s present.

Filming began in August 1932. It was shot at Islington, Beaconsfield and Welwyn Studios. The film's art direction is by Alex Vetchinsky. It was popular enough to be re-issued in 1939.

== Cast ==
- Cicely Courtneidge as Jenny Marvello / Maisie Marvello
- Edward Everett Horton as Sebastian Marvello
- Anthony Bushell as Lieutenant Ronald Jamieson
- Dorothy Hyson as Judy Marvello
- Frank Cellier as Colonel Philip Markham
- Leslie Sarony as Wally
- Bransby Williams as Dan Marvello
- Albert Rebla as Albert Marvello
- Herschel Henlere as Mozart Marvello
- Ivor McLaren as Harry Marvello
- Olive Sloane as Sarah Marvello
- Arty Ash as Doug
- O. B. Clarence as Tom
- David Deveen as Frank Marvello
- André Rolet as Marvello Adagio Troupe member
- Betty Semsey as Marvello Adagio Troupe member
- William Pardue as Marvello Adagio Troupe member
- Ian Wilson as Customer at Coffee Stall

== Critical reception ==
In 1933, The Sydney Morning Herald wrote, "It is Cicely Courtneldge's personality which carries Soldiers of the King to the moderate success which it achieves. Again and again, since the coming of talking films, the English studios have put forth flimsy stories of this character – stories which subside into horrific dulness when the actors do not exert themselves, and when the actors do put forth heroic efforts prove entertaining, but not commensurately so. If only the genius of English players could be backed by soldier, more close-knit thematic material, British films would reach brilliant heights of artistry. Perhaps the present migration of American actors and technical experts to London, counterbalancing a migration of English actors to Hollywood, will have an influence in this direction. It would be extremely pleasant to be able to record the arrival from England of a film equalling Lubltsch's memorable American production, Trouble in Paradise. Meanwhile, one can accept In a cheerful spirit this new vehicle for Miss Courtneldge's comic gifts. The actress has spent some time on the variety stage. So much becomes at once apparent when she begins to move on the screen. Her performance is one long romp, in which she fools to her heart's content, and continually sacrifices development of character to effect's of burlesque...Not even her most rabid admirers would claim that she Is beautiful, either in feature or in form. It is her very angularity and her frank, genial homeliness which cause patrons of theatres to love her. The more undignified she can make herself look the better pleased she seems to be, and It Is good policy; for some of her strokes of grotesquerie are calculated to make any audience laugh its head off. Miss Courtneidge (who in private life is Mrs. Jack Hulbert) was born in Sydney, her father, Robert Courtneidge, being then on a tour of Australia, together with his wife, in the Gaiety Company. She has already been seen on the "screen in The Ghost Train and Jack's the Boy...Told more deftly and succinctly, the story of the Marvellos might have had a serious as well as a farcical Interest, but at present this Just misses fire. Edward Everett Horton, fresh from triumphs in Hollywood, provides invaluable support for Miss Courtneidge in his inimitable way; and Anthony Bushell, also frequently visible until lately In American films, makes an attractive juvenile lead. Soldiers of the King, released by the Fox Film Corporation, was screened on Saturday at the Plaza Theatre."

== Bibliography ==
- Harper, Sue. Picturing the Past: The Rise and Fall of the British Costume Film. British Film Institute, 1994.
- Sutton, David R. A Chorus of Raspberries: British Film Comedy 1929-1939. University of Exeter Press, 2000.
- Wood, Linda. British Films 1929-1939. British Film Institute, 1986.
