= Dan Rolyat =

Rolyat with Florence Smithson in The Arcadians (1909)

Dan Rolyat, born Herbert Taylor (11 November 1872 – 10 December 1927), was an English actor and singer. After an apprenticeship with a touring company he was engaged by the impresarios George Edwardes and Robert Courtneidge to play comic roles in musical comedy. He also played in variety shows and, later in his career, in farce.

Rolyat's greatest success was probably in the double role of John Smith and Simplicitas in The Arcadians (1909), first in the West End of London and then in the British provinces. While playing the role on tour he suffered a severe accident that threatened to end his career. He recovered and worked on until the mid-1920s when ill-health forced him to retire.

== Early life and career ==
Rolyat was born in Birmingham in the English Midlands, the son of Thomas Taylor, described in Who's Who in the Theatre as a "private gentleman". Rolyat was educated at Queen's College, Birmingham.

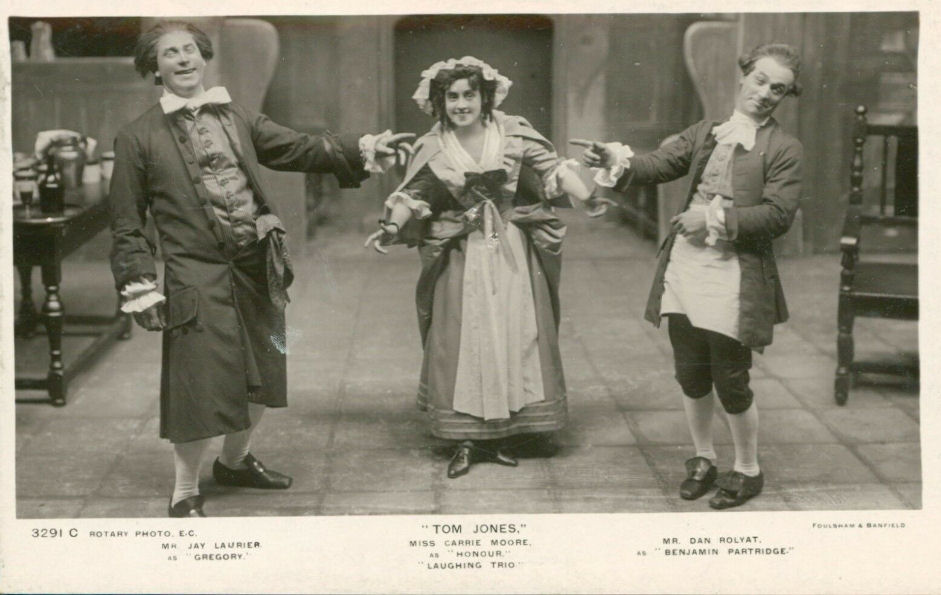
Jay Laurier (right) Carrie Moore and Dan Rolyat in Tom Jones (1907)

He adopted the stage name of Dan Rolyat – "Dan" in honour of Dan Leno and "Rolyat" because he thought "Taylor" more distinctive when spelled backwards than forwards. He made his stage debut at Coutts's Theatre, Birmingham, in 1896, and joined a touring company playing in From Scotland Yard and Sentenced for Life. He joined George Edwardes's company, and toured as Sammy Gigg in the musical comedy The Toreador (1901). He was a member of Fred Karno's company, playing Sergeant Lightning in The Dandy Thieves (1905) and then appeared in variety. He had established a reputation as a whimsically original comedian when he was cast for his first West End show in 1906 at the Apollo Theatre. This was The Dairymaids, by Paul Rubens and Arthur Wimperis. Rolyat played Joe Mivens; The Times thought him as funny as the show's star comedian, Walter Passmore, and The Observer considered him to be the funnier of the two. In 1907 Rolyat created the role of Benjamin Partridge in Edward German's comic opera Tom Jones. That Christmas, he played the Baron in a pantomime version of Cinderella at the Theatre Royal, Birmingham.

The Dairymaids had been produced by the impresario Robert Courtneidge, who engaged Rolyat to create the double role of John Smith and Simplicitas in the long-running musical The Arcadians in 1909. Also for Courtneidge, Rolyat played Suki in The Mousmé (1911). In 1912, while touring in The Arcadians, he fell from his horse in Act II at the Tyne Theatre and Opera House and suffered such severe injuries to his back that there was doubt whether he would ever be able to appear on stage again. He recovered after several months and toured as Prince Bogumil in Princess Caprice in 1913.

== Later years ==
Returning to the West End in October 1914, Rolyat appeared as Simon Slinks in a revival of another musical, Miss Hook of Holland. For the rest of his career he performed in variety and musical comedy, and in 1922 he played in a non-musical farce, Nuts in May. In the mid-1920s his health gave way, and he had to retire from performing. He underwent surgery for oral cancer, but the operation was unsuccessful. An all-star benefit show was organised to raise money to support him.

Rolyat was twice married. His first wife was the singer and actress Florence Smithson; the marriage was dissolved, and in 1915 he married the actress Constance Worth. He died at his home in Brixton, south London, at the age of fifty-five and was buried at Streatham Park Cemetery in London.
