= Beloved Augustin =

Beloved Augustin (German:Der liebe Augustin) may refer to:

- Beloved Augustin (1940 film), an Austrian film
- Der liebe Augustin, an operetta by Leo Fall later produced in English as Princess Caprice
- Der liebe Augustin, a novel by Horst Wolfram Geissler
- Beloved Augustin (1960 film), a West German film
- "Oh du lieber Augustin", a song composed by the seventeenth century Austrian singer Marx Augustin

== See also ==
- Princess Caprice
