= The Mousmé =

1911 British musical comedy

- The Maids of Japan
- Music: Lionel Monckton; Howard Talbot
- Lyrics: Arthur Wimperis; Percy Greenbank
- Book: Alexander M. Thompson; Robert Courtneidge
- Premiere: September 9, 1991: Shaftesbury Theatre, London

The Mousmé; or The Maids of Japan is an Edwardian musical comedy in three acts with a book by Alexander M. Thompson and Robert Courtneidge, lyrics by Arthur Wimperis and Percy Greenbank and music by Lionel Monckton and Howard Talbot, premiered in 1911 at the Shaftesbury Theatre, London. The musical was next staged in Tokyo (at the Tokyo Imperial Theater), and in Yokohama and Osaka, Japan, in 1912.

It is an example of Japonisme, during a time of high popularity of everything Japanese in Europe. In the development and production of the musical, efforts were made to create an authentic depiction of Japanese culture through stage and costume design and plot elements. The music, however, was almost completely Western, with a few allusions to Asian musical styles.

== Plot ==
In Japan during the Russo-Japanese War O Hana San sells herself to a Geisha house to pay off the gambling debts of her lover, Captain Fujiwara. Meanwhile, Miyo Ko San, is the daughter of Japanese general, Okubo, and an English mother. She is in love with Lieutenant Makei but is betrothed to the officer Yamaki, who in turn has designs on O Hana San. Yamaki is eventually killed in an earthquake, freeing both couples to live "happily ever after."

== Musical numbers ==
Act I (The Shrine at Tsumura)

- Chorus – "Where else but in Japan..."
- Miyo – "Honourable Jappy bride..."
- Chorus of Geisha – "Gay little, glad little girls are we..."
- Chorus of Village Girls and Song: Suki – "Suki is coming..." and "Simply send for Suki."
- Hana – "I know nothing of life..."
- Hana, Miyo, Fujiwara and Makei – "Hide-and-Seek."
- Hana and Fujiwara – "Little flower of Japan..."
- Finale: Act I – "Drums are beating, bugles bray..."

Act II (The Tea House of Sweet Content in Tokyo)

- Chorus – "Very fine tea-house, this..."
- Tanaka and Chorus of Geisha – "The Western Dance."
- Miyo and Men – "What is this we see?"
- Hana and Chorus – "My samisen."
- Suki and Chorus – "I've faced some dangers terrible..."
- Miyo and Makei – "Foreign Customs."
- Hashimoto – "The corner of my eye."
- Finale – "Is this your love? This living lie!"

Act III (The Temple Grounds at Tsumura)

- Chorus – "Fair the cherry blossom blows..."
- Reprise (very quietly, beneath dialogue)
- Sextet – Makei, Tanaka, Guest and Geisha - "The Mi-Ai."
- Mitsu and Suki – "Memories."
- Miyo and Chorus – "The little Japanese Mamma."
- Hana – "The Temple Bell."
- Chorus of the Glance Meeting – "Miyo and Yamaki we await..."
- Finale – "Hail, hail, Sakura!"

Addendum

- Miyo and Chorus of Girls – "Men are all the same..."
- Tanaka and Geisha – "The singing maid."
- Suki and Mitsu – "Suki and Co."
- Makei and Girls – "Japanese soldier boy."

== Cast ==
Role	Actor
Captain Fujiwara	Harry Welchman
Lieutenant Makei	Nelson Keys
Hashimoto (a Tea House Keeper)	George Hestor
Tanaka (a Journalist)	Harry Ray
Suki (a Fourtune Teller)	Dan Rolyat
Miyo Ko San	Cicely Courtneidge
Mitsu (Mistress of Geisha)	Ada Blanche
O Hana San	Florence Smithson
Ko-Giku (a geisha)	May Etheridge
Ko-Matsu (a geisha)	Sheila Hayes

== Background ==
In the mid-19th century, Japan became fashionable in Europe due to expanded import of Japanese art, decor and goods to the continent; European countries, including United Kingdom, fell to a Japonisme "craze". In the 1862, the first World Fair in London was visited by Takenouchi Yasunori, after which the popularity of items from Japan and curiosity about the culture expanded into 1880s, and in 1884 a Japanese Village Exhibition in Knightsbridge, and the 1885 premiere of the comic opera The Mikado were extraordinary popular successes. After the premiere of that opera, London's Daily Telegraph wrote, "We are all being more or less Japanned".

In the 1990s, concern for authenticity was important in designing Edwardian musical comedies set in East Asia, like The Cingalee (Sri Lanka), The Blue Moon (India), San Toy, A Chinese Honeymoon (China) and The Geisha (Japan). The Mousmé continued this concern of musicals in depicting foreign cultures as authentically as practicable in an effort to serve as a "virtual travel" for the British audience. The Mousmé attempts to create a distinctly Japanese story, costumes and decor. Whether this goal was achieved has been debated, with one writer arguing, in 1912, that the plot, although based on Japanese literature, might have been a "mere thread on which to hang the pretty scenes".

To bolster The Mousmé's claim to authenticity, a statement from Ito Hirokuni (Baron Ito), son of the Japanese prime minister Ito Hirobumi, was included in the original programme: "I feel bound to say that of The Mousmé shows the best picture of Japan I have seen on your English stage, and although I understand that Mr. Courtneidge sacrificed considerable time visiting Japan to get the real spirit of my country for his new play, the result justifies the trouble he has taken. He is giving much pleasure to my compatriots and myself".

== Production ==
The Mousmé had a book written by Alexander M. Thompson and Robert Courtneidge, with lyrics by Arthur Wimperis and Percy Greenbank and music by Lionel Monckton and Howard Talbot. Courtneidge was the director, with choreography was by Espinosa and Alfred H. Majilton; stage designs were by Conrad Tritschler, with costumes by C. Wilhelm.

To achieve a realistic image of Japan, Courtneidge visited the country to study the culture, mannerisms and dining customs to include in the production; this was remarked on in both the London première programme and in promotional text in the monthly magazine Playgoer and Society Illustrated. Courtneidge also sent composer Howard Talbot to Japan to add into the musical score the "occasional Japanese phrase". C. Wilhelm never travelled abroad, but his designs were carefully researched; an article about The Mousmé in Cassell's Magazine notes that there were nearly 400 costumes. In the programme, Ito Hirokuni described the female costumes in particular as "very true to life, their colouring and style quite reminding of the dresses of the people at home".

Courtneidge had four companies touring The Mousmé in 1912, taking the musical to 100 locations. Expansive production endded up being a financial disaster for its producer, who was otherwise "used to nothing but success."

== Reception ==
The opera was met with general praise in Britain especially for its perceived authentic representation of exotic Japan through sets and costumes, which "made a 'virtual tour' of Japan possible and facilitated imaginary travel."

The responses towards The Mousmé in Japan, where it toured to in 1912, were more varied. Zoe Kincaid Penlington criticised it in The Far East, saying that "a superficial acquaintance with real Japan would enable one to see how hopeless was the interpretation of local colour." However, Japanese audiences were not all against the production. Most of them were drawn to the western music and the European culture which it represented. By accepting The Mousmé, the audience viewed it as the consequence of making oneself seen by the modern world; by attending the show, the Japanese asserted themself as "modern and cosmopolitan."
