= Alexander M. Thompson =

German-born English journalist and dramatist

Alexander Mattock Thompson (9 May 1861 – 25 March 1948), sometimes credited as A. M. Thompson, was a German-born English journalist and dramatist. From the 1880s, Thompson wrote for socialist newspapers and journals, co-founding The Clarion in 1891. He became an important librettist of Edwardian musical comedies in the early 20th century.

== Biography ==
Thompson was born in Karlsruhe, Grand Duchy of Baden (now in Germany), to English parents. When he was five years old, the family moved to Paris, where he was educated at the Lycée Saint-Louis.

Thompson began a career as a journalist in Manchester, England, writing for several papers in the 1880s and meeting the socialist writer Robert Blatchford, who would become his lifelong friend. In 1891, with capital of only £400, Thompson, Blatchford and others founded the socialist newspaper The Clarion in Manchester, which was important in promoting the Labour Party. The editors' views were much influenced by the writings of William Morris. In addition to writing on social topics, Thompson wrote theatre criticism, travel articles and on other subjects under the pseudonym 'Dangle'. The Clarion's life was always precarious, but among its successes was a series of articles by Blatchford, collected in a volume entitled Merrie England, dedicated to Thompson. It was said that for every convert to socialism made by Das Kapital there were a hundred made by Merrie England.

Thompson's first professional works for the stage in the late 1890s were scripts for pantomimes written for Robert Courtneidge, who was then the manager of the Prince's Theatre in Manchester. Thompson then collaborated with Courtneidge on many of his libretti.

Thompson then turned to Edwardian musical comedies, revising the libretto of Walter Ellis's The Blue Moon (1905) after Ellis's death. He next supplied the text for Courtneidge's The Dairymaids (1906 at the Apollo Theatre), which became internationally successful. In 1907, Thompson and Courtneidge adapted Henry Fielding's Tom Jones as a comic opera with music by Edward German, also at the Apollo. Two years later, at the Shaftesbury Theatre, he collaborated on the hit musical The Arcadians, one of the most famous and enduring musicals of its era.

In 1911, Thompson wrote a book describing his travels in Germany, Russia, China, Spain and, especially, Japan, entitled Japan for a Week, Britain Forever, published by J. Lane. The Manchester Guardian commented that the book "revealed his powers both as a stylist and as a keen observer."

Thompson returned to writing for the stage with an original book for a Japanese-set musical romance, The Mousmé (1911, Shaftesbury); it was a failure, although it met with critical praise. Collaborating again with Courtneidge, he adapted the composer Leo Fall's operetta Der liebe Augustin as Princess Caprice (1912, Shaftesbury). Other works with Courtneidge followed, but none of these found an audience. In 1916, his revusical set in ancient Rome called Oh, Caesar! played with some success in Edinburgh, Scotland. The Rebel Maid in 1921, a return to light opera with Courtneidge, played 114 London performances at the Empire Theatre. A 1924 play was The Bohemians produced by Courtneidge.

During World War I and afterwards, Thompson wrote many articles for the Weekly Dispatch concerning the Labour movement, the condition of the poor and other social topics. He also wrote for the Daily Mail and later the News Chronicle and The Manchester Guardian. In 1937, he published an autobiography, Here I Lie - The Memorial of an Old Journalist.

Thompson died in London at the age of 86.
