= C. Wilhelm =

English designer for theatre (1858–1925)

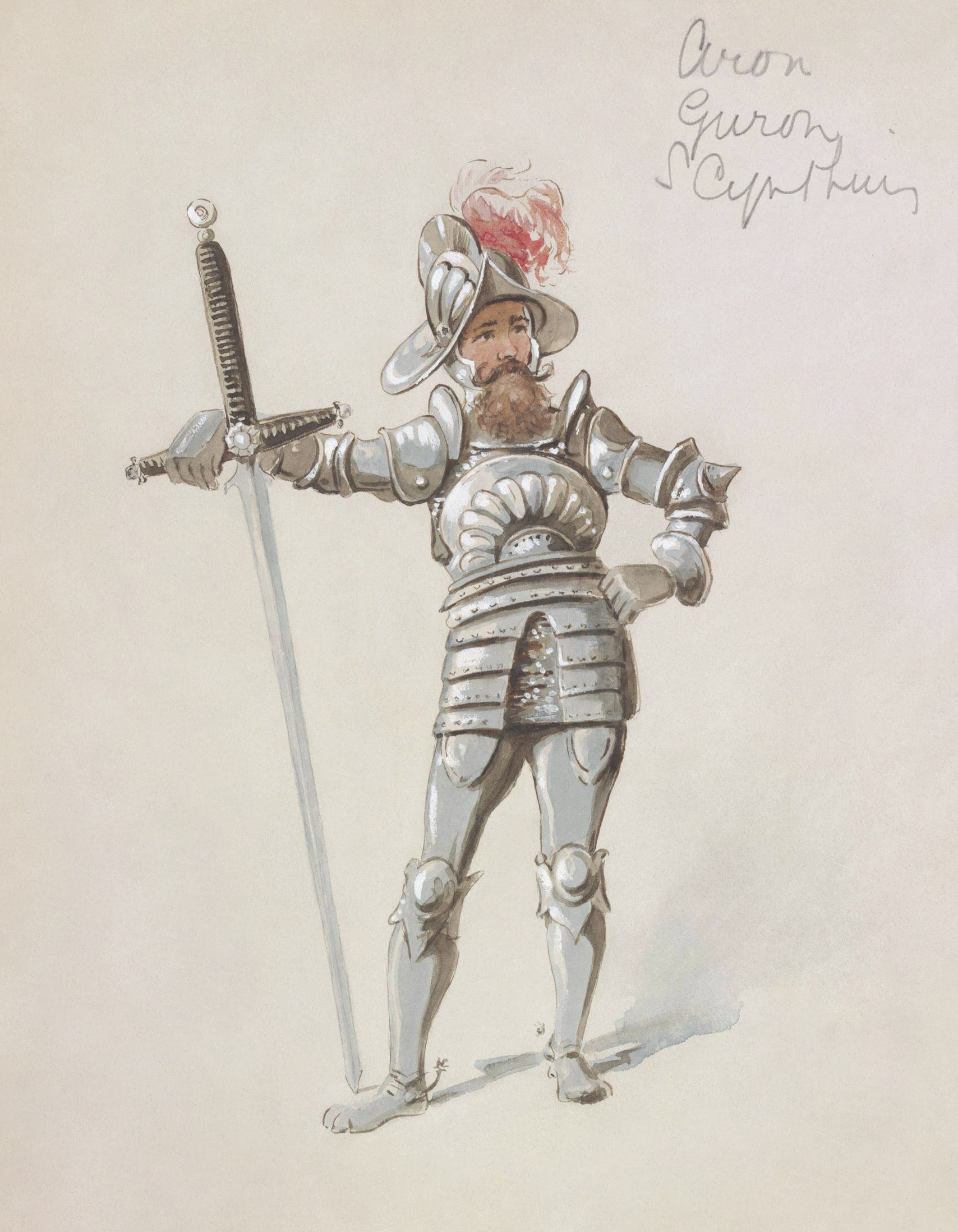
Costume design for Arac, Gunon and Scynthius in Princess Ida (1884)

William John Charles Pitcher (21 March 1858 – 2 March 1925), known as Wilhelm or C. Wilhelm, was an English artist, costume and scenery designer, best known for his designs for ballets, pantomimes, comic operas and Edwardian musical comedies.

== Life and career ==
Wilhelm was born at Northfleet, in Kent, England, the son of a shipbuilder.

The young artist showed early promise, and J. R. Planché recommended him to design for the Theatre Royal, Drury Lane. There, Wilhelm created costumes, beginning in 1877, for numerous works, including the famous pantomimes of Sir Augustus Harris and for others until 1897, including the spectacular drama, Armada (1888). He also designed costumes for various music hall artists and for many London theatres, including Her Majesty's Theatre, The Coliseum and The Crystal Palace, and for three pantomimes at the Lyceum Theatre. For Robert Courtneidge in Manchester, England, Wilhelm designed two Shakespeare plays: A Midsummer Night's Dream and As You Like It. Wilhelm also designed costumes for numerous pantomimes, including Cinderella, Dick Whittington and Blue Beard. He was the designer for some of the costumes in several of the original Gilbert and Sullivan operas at the Savoy Theatre in the 1880s, including Iolanthe, Princess Ida, The Sorcerer (revival), The Mikado, and Ruddigore. He also designed costumes for Jane Annie at the Savoy (1893) and for the Olympia, London spectacles Nero (1889) and Venice (1891).

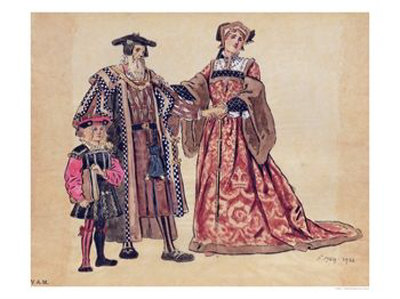
A design for As You Like It

Wilhelm was, perhaps, best known for his work for the Empire Theatre, London, from 1887 to 1915, where he designed both scenery and costumes for (and sometimes produced) numerous ballets, many of which starred Adeline Genée, and which established a fashion for stage design and were much imitated. His later costume designs included The New Aladdin (1906); Edward German's opera Tom Jones (1907); Peter Pan (the famous mermaid costumes for the 1905 revival); and The Arcadians (1909) and The Mousmé (1911), among other musical comedies. Wilhelm's costume designs were seen on Broadway in Ruddigore (1887), A Runaway Girl (1898–99), The Toreador (1902), Three Little Maids (1903), The Babes and the Baron (1905–06), The Red Mill (1906–07), The Soul Kiss (1908), The Silver Star (1909–10), The Old Town (1910), The Arcadians (1910), The Girl in the Train (1910), The Lady of the Slipper (1912–13), Chin Chin (1914–15), The Yankee Princess (1922), Stepping Stones (scenic and costume design, 1923–24) and Madame Pompadour (1924–25).

London's The Times wrote, "Wilhelm excelled especially in rendering the spirit and detail of historical periods, but he had also an amusing skill in turning modern costumes to his fantastic purposes.... to his imaginative gifts he added remarkable precision and firmness in execution and great ingenuity in the treatment of colour." Wilhelm also contributed a number of articles on the art of the theatre to The Magazine of Art, including "Art in Ballet" (1895). In his last years, he focused on watercolour painting, especially of flowers and plant life, and illustrating children's books, including The Child of the Air, and he was elected to the Royal Institute of Painters in Water Colours in 1920.

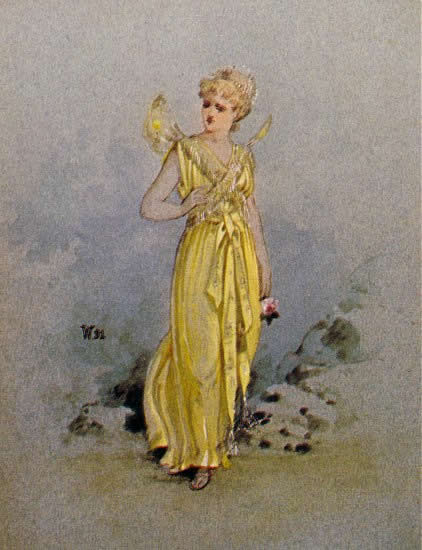
Wilhelm's 1882 design for the title role in Iolanthe

He died in London just short of his 67th birthday and is buried in Brompton cemetery.
