= The Arcadians (musical) =

Edwardian musical comedy composed by Lionel Monckton and Howard Talbot

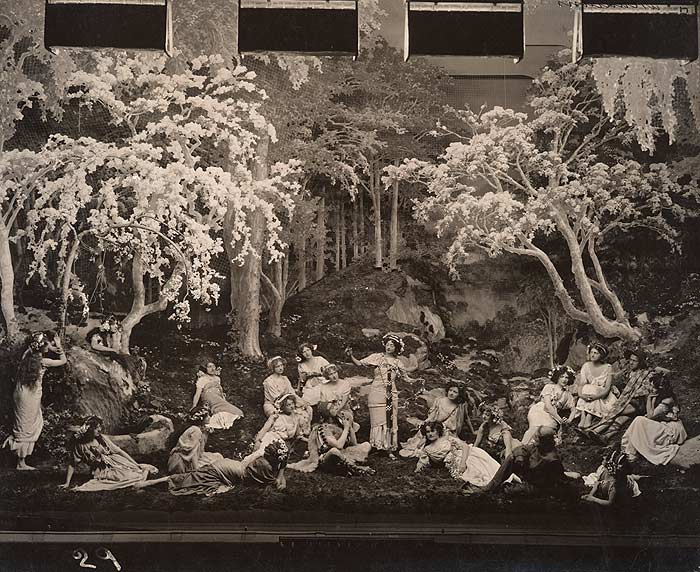
Scene from The Arcadians, 1909

The Arcadians is an Edwardian musical comedy styled a "Fantastic Musical Play" in three acts with a book by Mark Ambient and Alexander M. Thompson, lyrics by Arthur Wimperis, and music by Lionel Monckton and Howard Talbot. The story concerns some idyllic Arcadians who wish to transform wicked London to a land of truth and simplicity.

First produced by Robert Courtneidge, the musical opened at the Shaftesbury Theatre in London, on 29 April 1909, and ran for 809 performances. This was the third longest run for any musical theatre piece up to that time. The production starred Phyllis Dare, Dan Rolyat and Florence Smithson. A Broadway production opened in 1910 and ran for 193 performances. The piece was toured extensively, revived professionally in Britain, and a silent film version was made in 1927. It was popular with amateur theatre groups, particularly in Britain, throughout the 20th century. Recordings of some of its numbers were made in 1909 and 1915 by original members of the London cast, and more substantial excerpts and one complete performance have been released on compact disc.

The work is regarded by theatre historians as the finest example of its genre, with Monckton's melodic talent supported by Talbot's technical skill. The score contains elements characteristic of the Savoy Operas of the previous generation as well as broader numbers reminiscent of the music hall.

== Background ==
Arcadia, a legendary land of rural perfection peopled by beautiful virtuous innocents, first described by the Ancient Greeks, was a popular setting for writers of the 19th century, notably W. S. Gilbert (in Happy Arcadia, The Wicked World and Iolanthe). London critics, including the review in The Times, compared The Arcadians with Gilbert's The Wicked World. The development of aviation and flying in the early years of the 20th century captivated the public's attention. Writers fantasised about the strange adventures that might befall those who ventured to travel by the new-fangled aeroplane. A forced landing, perhaps, in some long-forgotten land where time has stood still. These stories laid the basis for The Arcadians.

Postcard advertising the original production

By 1909, Lionel Monckton and Howard Talbot had each had met considerable success writing songs and scores for Edwardian musical comedies. Monckton had contributed to many hit George Edwardes shows, including The Geisha and Our Miss Gibbs, and written complete scores to successes like A Country Girl and The Cingalee. Talbot had a monstrous hit with A Chinese Honeymoon and had written such other long-running musicals as The Girl from Kays. He had worked with writer Alexander M. Thompson and producer Robert Courtneidge previously, including on The Blue Moon.

Historically, musically and dramatically, The Arcadians and the other Edwardian musical comedies sit between the fading world of British comic opera, like the Gilbert and Sullivan works, and the later styles of musical comedy and music hall. The Arcadians particularly illustrates this, with the innocent Arcadians representing the older style, and the brash Londoners embodying the new. This contrast between simplicity and cynicism drive the plot and its humour, a contrast personified in the character of Smith, who is magically transformed during the piece. In 1999, Raymond McCall observed that theatre historians have variously referred to the work as an operetta or a musical comedy, commenting:

The score itself contributes to the discrepancy in labeling. The music for the Arcadian scenes in Act I has harmonies and rhythms that suggest the styles of Arthur Sullivan and Edward German; the quick step, however, dominates the London scenes. Simplicitas, like Bunthorne [in Patience] saunters down Piccadilly, but the tune is definitely not pre-Raphaelite"

== Production history ==
The piece was commissioned and staged by the impresario Robert Courtneidge, at the Shaftesbury Theatre in London. The production opened on 29 April 1909 and ran for 809 performances. Only two musical shows had previously had longer runs: Dorothy (1886) and A Chinese Honeymoon (1901), which ran for 931 and 1,075 performances respectively. The show starred Phyllis Dare as Eileen, Dan Rolyat as Smith, Harry Welchman as Jack, and Florence Smithson as Sombra. Cicely Courtneidge, the producer's daughter, later took over the role of Eileen. The musical director was Arthur Wood. The costumes were by Wilhelm, who 27 years earlier had designed the Arcadian costumes for Iolanthe. (Note: Wilhelm designed all the costumes for the 1882 production of Iolanthe but was not credited in the programme.)

Climax of Act II, with Simplicitas riding "The Deuce"

A Broadway production opened at the Liberty Theatre in 1910, and ran for 193 performances, starring Frank Moulan, Connie Ediss and Julia Sanderson. Courtneidge assembled a touring company, which played the piece in the British provinces for ten years. He revived the show in 1915 in London, with success. The cast included Welchman, Alfred Lester and H. C. Pearce from the original production; other members were Cicely Courtneidge, Jack Hulbert, Hope Charteris and Dan Agar.

The piece was popular with amateur theatre groups throughout the 20th century, particularly in Britain, where it received more than 225 productions. In modern productions it has become customary to amend some of Ambient and Thompson's dialogue, which is full of topical references and old fashioned puns, but the gentle satire of the pretensions and follies of high society has not dated.

== Synopsis ==
Act I

Sombra, one of the beautiful but naïve Arcadians, is troubled by reports of a place beyond the sea where "monsters" live in cages of brick and stone and never tell the truth – a place called London. The Arcadians beg Father Time to bring them a Londoner. He reluctantly agrees and causes the amateur aviator James Smith, an ageing London restaurateur with passions for aeroplanes and philandering, to crash land in Arcadia, where no one tells lies or grows older, where money is unknown, and employment is unnecessary. The Arcadians and Smith exchange stories, and Smith introduces the Arcadians to some new concepts: ugliness, jealousy and lying. He attempts to seduce Sombra by telling a lie. Far from impressed, the Arcadians immerse him in the Well of Truth, from which he emerges transformed into a young man, wearing the scanty costume of Arcadia, with a luxuriant head of hair but minus his mutton-chop whiskers. They christen him "Simplicitas", and he will remain young until he tells a lie. His hosts dispatch him with missionary zeal, and two agelessly beautiful Arcadian nymphs, Sombra and her sister, Chrysaea, to wicked London to "set up the truth in England for ever more, and banish the lie."

Act II

The luckless jockey Peter Doody

They begin their crusade at Askwood races, where it is Cup Day. They cause considerable curiosity, being still clothed in the costumes of Arcady (everyone else is dressed up formally in this scene, anticipating the similar scene in My Fair Lady 50 years later). (Note: Traubner comments that it is difficult to believe that Cecil Beaton had not seen the black and white photographs of the original West End or Broadway productions when he was designing the Ascot scene in My Fair Lady a half century later, "though it is possible he did not".) But instead of improving the Londoners, the Arcadians adopt some of their wicked ways, including betting on the races. Here Simplicitas meets his wife Mrs. Smith, who, not recognising her husband, proceeds to fall in love with the young stranger. Simplicitas flirts with her and agrees to help her open up an Arcadian restaurant in London. Then comes an opportunity for Simplicitas to distinguish himself. Jack Meadows, who was to have ridden his temperamental horse "The Deuce" has been thrown by the animal, and Peter Doody, the hapless replacement jockey, has also been injured by "The Deuce". Sombra arranges that Simplicitas shall take his mount, as the Arcadians have the gift of speech with animals, and the brute becomes as gentle as a lamb. Simplicitas (while sound asleep), upon "The Deuce", wins the race, to the great satisfaction of its owner. Romantic complications ensue between Meadows and Eileen Cavanagh, a young Irish woman.

Act III

Simplicitas/Smith's Arcadian restaurant has become the rage of London, as the menu is that of the simple life. Simplicitas, however, is not living and spreading the simple life as his Arcadian friends had hoped, but rather is having "the time of his life". Mrs. Smith becomes suspicious of Simplicitas, and in endeavouring to explain the reason for an all-night absence, he tells another lie. He falls into the ornamental well in the restaurant and emerges as his former self, with his bald head and shaggy whiskers, to the astonishment and somewhat to the confusion of his wife. Sombra and Chrysaea, realising that their mission to make all London tell the truth has failed, return to Arcadia – but they leave two happy couples behind.

== Roles and original cast ==
Phyllis Dare as Eileen Cavanagh

- Smith/Simplicitas, an elderly businessman (baritone) – Dan Rolyat
- Sombra, an Arcadian (soprano) – Florence Smithson
- Eileen Cavanagh, a natural Irish girl (mezzo-soprano) – Phyllis Dare
- Chrysaea, an Arcadian soubrette and Sombra's sister (soprano) – May Kinder
- Mrs Smith, Smith's wife (non-singing) – Ada Blanche
- Jack Meadows, a racehorse owner (baritone) – Harry Welchman (Note: Welchman was ill and did not appear during the first three weeks of the run; H. E. Pearce covered for him in addition to retaining his own role of Astrophel in Act I.)
- Bobbie, a man-about-town (baritone) – Nelson Keys
- Peter Doody, an unsuccessful jockey (baritone) – Alfred Lester
- Astrophel, an Arcadian shepherd (tenor) – H. E. Pearce
- Amaryllis, an Arcadian shepherdess (soprano) – Billie Sinclair
- Strephon, an Arcadian shepherd (baritone) – Charles Charteris
- Sir George Paddock, a racegoer (non-singing) – Akerman May
- Lady Barclay (non-singing) – Violet Graham
- Time (baritone) – George Elton
- Percy Marsh (non-singing) – Deane Percival

== Musical numbers ==
The score was substantially revised during the original run, with new numbers interpolated. The numbers listed in the table are from a 1909 vocal score.

| | | Words by | Music by |
|---|---|---|---|
Act I
| 1. | Introduction and opening chorus – "Arcadians are we" | Wimperis | Talbot |
| 2. | "I quite forgot Arcadia" – Father Time and Chorus | Wimperis | Monckton |
| 3. | "The Joy of Life" – Sombra, Chrysæa, Strephon and Astrophel | Wimperis | Talbot |
| 4. | "Look what hovers there above us" – Chorus | Wimperis | Talbot |
| 5. | "The Pipes of Pan are calling" – Sombra | Wimperis | Monckton |
| 6. | "All a lie!" – Chorus | Wimperis | Talbot |
| 7. | "Sweet Simplicitas" – Simplicitas and Chorus | Wimperis | Talbot |
| 8. | Finale: "To all and each" – Sombra, Chrysæa, Strephon, Astrophel and Chorus | Wimperis | Talbot |
Act II
| 9. | "That's all over, bar the shouting" – Chorus | Wimperis | Monckton |
| 10. | "Back your fancy" – Bobbie and Chorus | Wimperis | Monckton |
| 11. | "The Girl with a Brogue" – Eileen and Chorus | Wimperis | Monckton |
| 12. | Shower chorus – "This is really altogether too provoking" | Wimperis | Talbot |
| 13. | "Arcady is ever young" – Sombra | Monckton and Wimperis | Monckton |
| 14. | "Somewhere" – Simplicitas | Wimperis | Monckton |
| 15. | "Fickle Fortune" – Jack and Chorus | Wimperis | Monckton |
| 16. | "Charming Weather" – Eileen and Jack | Monckton and Wimperis | Monckton |
| 17. | Finale – "The horses are out" | Wimperis | Talbot |
Act III
| 18. | "Plant your posies" – Chorus | Wimperis | Talbot |
| 19. | "I like London" – Chrysæa | Wimperis | Talbot |
| 20. | "My Motter" – Doody | Wimperis | Talbot |
| 21. | Chorus of Belgravians – "Cheer for Simplicitas!" – Chorus | Wimperis | Monckton |
| 22. | "Bring me a rose – Eileen | Monckton and Wimperis | Monckton |
| 23. | "Truth is so beautiful" – Jack, Bobbie and Simplicitas | Wimperis | Monckton |
| 24. | "Half-past two" – Eileen and Jack | Greenbank and Wimperis | Talbot |
| 25. | "Light is my heart" – Sombra | Wimperis | Talbot |
| 26. | Finale – "Truth is so beautiful" (reprise) | Wimperis | Monckton |

Florence Smithson as Sombra

Numbers 15, 19, 22 and 25 were later cut, the last replaced by a waltz song for Sombra, "Here amid the city's clamour". Another edition of the vocal score, also dated 1909 but evidently printed later than that cited here, includes four new numbers: "I'm a case of complete reformation" (Simplicitas and Chorus, Act I, music by Talbot), which was later cut; "The only girl alive" (Jack, Act III) and "Come back to Arcady" (Sombra, Act III), both with music by Talbot; and most notably one of the show's big hit songs, "All down Piccadilly" (Simplicitas and Chorus, Act II), with music by Monckton who also co-wrote the words with Wimperis. Other numbers added during the run were "People often tell us luck and love are jealous" (Jack and Chorus) and "Little George Washington, once on a day, took out his hatchet and, so people say" (Simplicitas, Jack and Bobbie).

== Critical opinion ==
The show received favourable reviews. The Observer, though noting that an Arcadian theme was bound to provoke comparisons with Gilbert, found that the new piece "stands out among other plays of its class" with "moments to be remembered with joy". The Manchester Guardian, commenting that the piece would be "welcomed by patrons of musical comedy who had had their full dose of the Merry Widow", praised the originality of the writing, and called the score "simple and unpretentious, but melodious and pleasing". The Times said that Monckton and Talbot had surpassed themselves in their music, and that Courtneidge's production "showed ingenuity, care and to some extent originality, so that familiar elements took on an unfamiliar look and that new things had their full effect." The Daily Express observed, "surely it is a long time since an audience enjoyed a first night as much as this … [Courtneidge] has achieved the seemingly impossible. He has produced a 'new' musical comedy which really is new." The paper singled out for praise the songs, "The pipes of Pan", "Light is my heart", "The Girl with a Brogue", "Sweet Simplicitas", and "My motter".

The Arcadians is widely regarded as the finest Edwardian musical comedy. The historian Richard Traubner calls it "indisputably the greatest operetta (or musical comedy, if you will) of the Edwardian age". In 2006, Oxford University Press's Encyclopedia of Popular Music commented, "The show had a truly memorable score, and was full of engaging songs such as 'The Pipes of Pan', 'The Joy of Life' and 'Arcadia Is Ever Young', all sung by Florence Smithson; 'The Girl with the Brogue' (Phyllis Dare), 'Charming Weather' and 'Half Past Two' (Dare and Harry Welchman), 'Somewhere' (Dan Rolyat), and 'My Motter', which is sung in typically gloomy fashion by Alfred Lister. Another important song, 'All Down Piccadilly', was added at a later date, and became an accepted part of the score. The critic Andrew Lamb writes that The Arcadians is the best known of the works in which Talbot's greater technical expertise complemented the melodic talent of his collaborators such as Monckton. Lamb observes that Talbot was particularly skilled at writing ensembles and finales and that such numbers as the opening chorus, 'I like London', 'My Motter' and 'Half-past Two' "testify to Talbot's inventiveness and craftsmanship."

== Recordings and film ==
Members of the original cast recorded the following numbers from the show: "The pipes of Pan", "The girl with a brogue", "Arcady is ever young", "My motter", "Bring me a rose", "Come back to Arcady" and "Light is my heart". These recordings, made in 1909 and 1915, have been reissued on CD by EMI. In 1913 the Edison Light Opera Company made wax cylinder recordings of "Arcadians are we", "The girl with a brogue", "Arcady is ever young", "Charming weather", "Bring me a rose" and "Truth is so beautiful."

In 1968 most of the score (Note: The numbers omitted are: "I quite forgot Arcadia", "Look what hovers there above us", "All a lie!", "Sweet Simplicitas", "That’s all over, bar the shouting", "The horses are out", "Plant your posies", "Cheer for Simplicitas" and "My heart flies homing".) was recorded in stereo by EMI, with Vilém Tauský conducting a cast headed by June Bronhill, Ann Howard, Michael Burgess and Jon Pertwee. The following year Gilbert Vinter conducted ten numbers from the show, also for EMI. In 1999 a substantially complete score was recorded, with dialogue, by Ohio Light Opera, conducted by J. Lynn Thomson. In 2003, Theatre Bel-Etage, conducted by Mart Sander, recorded fifteen tracks from the score.

In 1927 Victor Saville directed a silent British film adaptation of the same name. It featured Ben Blue as Smith, Jeanne de Casalis as his wife, Vesta Sylva as Eileen, John Longden as Jack, Gibb McLaughlin as Doody, Doris Bransgrove as Sombra and Nancy Rigg as Chrysea. The music in the film was credited to Louis Levy.

== Notes and references ==
Notes

== Sources ==
- Gaye, Freda, ed. (1967). Who's Who in the Theatre (fourteenth ed.). London: Sir Isaac Pitman and Sons. OCLC 5997224.
- Green, Stanley (22 March 1980). "The Arcadians". Guide to Musical Theatre. New York: Da Capo Press. ISBN 0306801132.
- Mander, Raymond; Joe Mitchenson (1962). A Picture History of Gilbert and Sullivan. London: Vista Books. OCLC 859951.
- McCall, Raymond (1999). Notes to The Arcadians. Newport, R.I.: Newport Classic. OCLC 42740093.
- Monckton, Lionel; Howard Talbot; Arthur Wimperis. The Arcadians – vocal score. first of two 1909 impressions. London: Chappell.
- Monckton, Lionel; Howard Talbot; Arthur Wimperis (1909). The Arcadians – vocal score. second of two 1909 impressions. London: Chappell.
- Traubner, Richard (2003). Operetta – A Theatrical History. New York and London: Routledge. ISBN 0415966418.
