= Ada Blanche =

English actress and singer

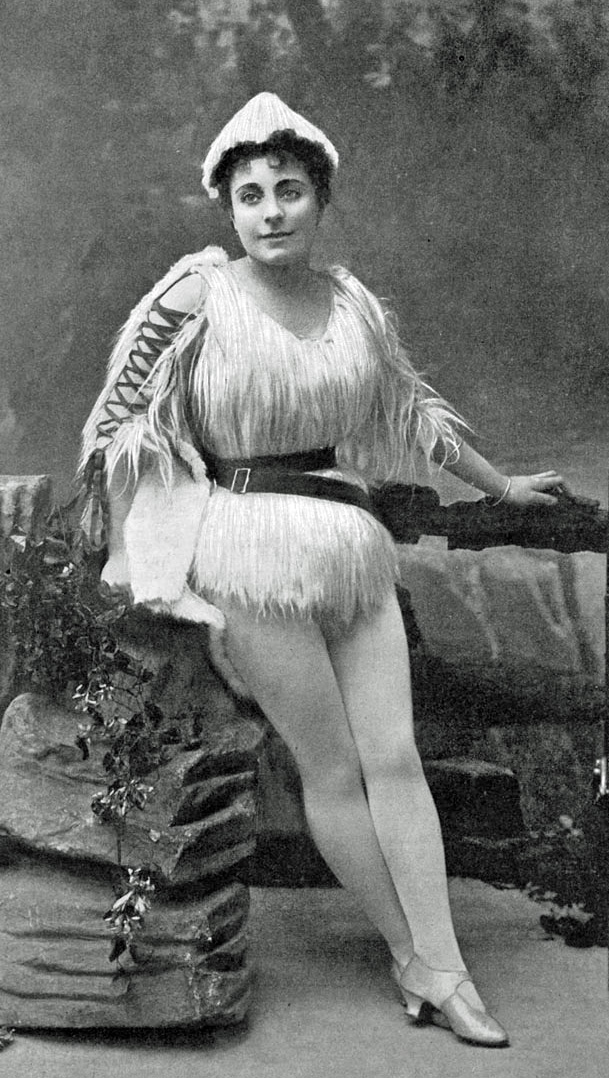
Blanche as Robinson Crusoe in 1893–94 Drury Lane pantomime

Ada Blanche (born Ada Cecilia Blanche Adams; 16 July 1862 – 1 January 1953) was an English actress and singer known early in her career for vivacious performances in Victorian burlesque and pantomime and later in character roles in Edwardian musical comedy.

Born into a theatrical family, Blanche made her stage debut at the age of fourteen and had a forty-five year career, almost exclusively on the British stage, in the West End and on tour. In the 1890s she was a leading principal boy in London's most lavishly staged pantomimes. In the 20th century her career changed to playing comic, formidable older women. Her most celebrated role of this kind was in the hit musical The Arcadians (1909), staged by her brother-in-law Robert Courtneidge.

Beyond musical comedy, Blanche appeared in farces and other comedies in non-singing roles between 1906 and her retirement in 1921. Among her co-stars during her long career were George Grossmith Jr., Dan Leno, Marie Lloyd, Walter Passmore, Kate Santley and Little Tich.

== Life and career ==
=== Early years ===
Blanche was born in Brixton, London, the daughter of the singer and actress Cicely Nott and her husband, Sam Adams, a theatre manager. The couple had five children, all of whom were later professionally associated with the theatre, including Rosaline, known professionally as Rosie Nott, who married the impresario Robert Courtneidge and was the mother of Cicely Courtneidge.

At the age of fourteen Blanche made her stage debut in London's Adelphi Theatre Christmas show, Little Goody Two Shoes. In 1878 she toured in Britain with the actor-manager Charles Calvert in Olivia, W. G. Wills's adaptation of Goldsmith's The Vicar of Wakefield, playing Polly Flamborough to her mother's Mrs Primrose. In the same year she appeared in her first breeches role in pantomime, playing Dandini in Cinderella at the Theatre Royal, Drury Lane. In 1879–80 she played at the Imperial Theatre in a rival version of Goldsmith's story, adapted by Tom Taylor and starring Marie Litton, Lionel Brough and Kyrle Bellew. For the same company she appeared in As You Like It in 1880.

For the 1880 pantomime season, Blanche returned to Drury Lane in Mother Goose. The principal breeches part was played by Kate Santley, and the cast included John D'Auban, Frank Wyatt and Arthur Roberts. Blanche was cast as the Princess, and her sister Addie Blanche took the title role. In 1882 Ada played the soprano role of Fiametta, to her mother's Peronella, in Emily Soldene's touring production of Suppé's operetta Boccaccio. The Manchester Guardian commented, "Miss Cecily Nott has a nice voice, which she would do well not to force too much. Miss Ada Blanche was pleasant and ingenuous, if not very finished." The theatre historian Kurt Gänzl writes that Blanche left this engagement "to fulfil the kind of substantial pantomime principal boy engagement which would be the backbone of her early career".

=== Touring and burlesque; pantomime stardom ===
Blanche's pantomime co-stars included (clockwise from top left) Little Tich, Dan Leno, Marie Lloyd and Herbert Campbell

In 1883–84 Blanche toured with Lila Clay's all-women operetta company; in 1885 she went to the US, joining the Holmes Burlesque Company on tour. Returning to Britain she joined Dion Boucicault's touring company, together with her mother and another sister, Edith Blanche. Between tours Blanche was establishing herself in the West End. In 1886 she appeared at the Gaiety Theatre, under the management of George Edwardes, in a supporting role in the burlesque Monte Cristo Jr.. She understudied the theatre's star, Nellie Farren, and when Edwardes assembled touring companies Blanche was cast in Farren's principal boy parts in this and later shows. On tour or in London she played in the burlesques Little Jack Sheppard (1886) and Miss Esmeralda (1887), and, as Farren aged, Blanche took the title roles in Ruy Blas and the Blasé Roué (1890) and Joan of Arc (1891).

Blanche was only briefly among the top names in West End burlesque, but in the 1890s she achieved and maintained the highest degree of stardom in pantomime under the management of Sir Augustus Harris at Drury Lane. In the six seasons from December 1892 she starred there in the theatre's lavish pantomime versions of Little Bo-Peep, Robinson Crusoe, Dick Whittington and His Cat, Cinderella, Aladdin and Babes in the Wood. In the title role of Robinson Crusoe, she was singled out by The Times for mention before her famous co-stars, Little Tich, Dan Leno, Marie Lloyd and Herbert Campbell. The paper commented, "Miss Ada Blanche as Robinson Crusoe would probably have astonished Daniel Defoe; but her liveliness and amusing impertinence atoned for lack of fidelity to the original character." In Dick Whittington, a reporter for The Era thought she "sang well, danced well and acted well", going onto say: "she was the life and soul of the evening. When the entertainment was flagging, on she came with her relentless spirit and energy."

=== Later career ===
With Tom Terriss in The Medal and the Maid, 1903

As the 1890s went on, Blanche was given a few starring roles in musical comedy. Harris presented an English version of La demoiselle du téléphone, an operette by Maurice Desvallières and Gaston Serpette. With an English text by Harris and F. C. Burnand, The Telephone Girl debuted in 1896 and toured the provinces off and on until 1900, with Blanche in the title role. The Manchester Guardian observed:

The company is fortunate in having at its head so accomplished an actress as Miss Ada Blanche. Her vivacious but refined method, her expressive singing, clever dancing, and general daintiness of touch have long since made her a favourite with local theatre-goers, as was abundantly proved by the cordiality of her reception last night. Miss Blanche is, of course, the telephone girl, and as the interest centres in Lottie Myrtle and her love affair, it need hardly be said that she once again proved her right to be accorded a high rank among English actresses of vaudeville and burlesque.

Outside the pantomime season, Blanche's West End seasons during the late 1890s and early 1900s were few. In 1898 she co-starred with Courtice Pounds and Lottie Venne in The Royal Star, which ran only briefly; the following year she joined George Grossmith Jr. and Willie Edouin in Great Caesar, as Cleopatra to Grossmith's Mark Antony. In 1903 she was in another musical comedy, The Medal and the Maid, which ran for six months. She played in Robert Courteidge's pantomimes in 1903 to 1905 and toured in a farce, What the Butler Saw, from 1906 to 1908.

The great West End success of Blanche's career came in her mid-40s in the hit musical comedy The Arcadians, in which she had the non-singing comic role of Mrs Smith, the wife of the protagonist. The piece ran from April 1909 until August 1911. Courtneidge later cast her in three more of his productions: she played Mitsu in The Mousmé (1911), Mrs Baxter-Browne in The Pearl Girl (1913), and Lady Elizabeth Weston in The Rebel Maid (1921). Under other managements in 1917, she played Miss Carruthers in a "comedy of terrors", Seven Days, and Madame Morney in the farce The Spring Song with the young Ralph Lynn.

Despite a starry cast in which Blanche's co-stars included Walter Passmore and C. Hayden Coffin, The Rebel Maid ran for only four months. When it closed, Blanche retired, first to Yorkshire and later to west London.

Blanche never married. She died at St. Mary's Convent in Chiswick on 1 January 1953 at the age of 90.

== Sources ==
- Parker, John (1925). Who's Who in the Theatre (fifth ed.). London: Sir Isaac Pitman and Sons. OCLC 10013159.
