= Fred Thompson (writer) =

English writer, best known as a librettist (1884–1949)

Programme cover, 1916, with caricatures of Alfred Lester and George Robey

Frederick A. Thompson, usually credited as Fred Thompson (24 January 1884 – 10 April 1949) was an English writer, best known as a librettist for about fifty British and American musical comedies in the first half of the 20th century. Among the writers with whom he collaborated were George Grossmith Jr., P. G. Wodehouse, Guy Bolton and Ira Gershwin. Composers with whom he worked included Lionel Monckton, Ivor Novello and George Gershwin.

Many of Thompson's shows became popular hits, including To-night's the Night (1914), The Bing Boys are Here (1916), The Boy (1917), Lady, Be Good! (1924), Rio Rita (1927), Funny Face (1927) and Follow the Girls (1944).

== Biography ==
Thompson was born in London and raised in Newton Abbot, Devon, in the west of England. He attended the Slade School of Fine Art in London and trained as an architect. He was a skilled caricaturist, and in the early years of the 20th century he contributed regular theatrical caricatures to at least three London newspapers. He worked for three years as an actor, giving him an inside view of stagecraft, which he later put to use in his writing.

=== Early career ===
Thompson's first stage work was the book of the show The Lady Jockey in 1908. In 1913, he began a partnership with George Grossmith Jr. with the revue Eightpence a Mile, praised by The Times as "the brightest and swiftest, and on the whole the most entertaining of all the revues that have been produced in London". In May 1914, Thompson and Philip Braham collaborated on Violet and Pink, described as "a miniature musical comedy … with plenty of singing and dancing, any amount of jokes, and some catching music." The first big joint success of the Thompson and Grossmith partnership was To-night's the Night in 1914 (Broadway) and 1915 (London), with music by Paul Rubens and lyrics by Harry Greenbank.

After this success, Thompson's services were in demand for new West End shows. In November 1916, the first production at the new St Martin's Theatre was Thompson's Houp La! His best-known shows in this period included the World War I sensations The Bing Boys Are Here (1916, in collaboration with Grossmith) and The Boy (1917, with Lionel Monckton and Howard Talbot). Other successes included Pell-Mell (1916), The Bing Boys On Broadway (1918, with Grossmith and H.M. Vernon – a West End show, despite the title), Who's Hooper (1919, based on a Pinero play, composed by Ivor Novello) and The Golden Moth (1921, with P. G. Wodehouse, music by Novello). In 1919, he was the author, or part-author, of six shows running in London. Although most of Thompson's early shows were premiered in the West End, other early Broadway productions included Good Morning, Judge (1919; an adaptation of Pinero's The Magistrate), Afgar (1920), Vogues of 1924 and Marjorie (1924).

In 1924, Thompson had a big success in New York with a show written in collaboration with Guy Bolton, Lady, Be Good!, with music and lyrics by George and Ira Gershwin, and starring Fred Astaire and his sister Adele (also playing strongly in London in 1926). This was followed in swift succession by two more Broadway shows with Gershwin songs, Tell Me More and Tip-Toes (both 1925). In 1927 Thompson had three shows running on Broadway simultaneously: Rio Rita (also with Bolton, songs by Harry Tierney and Joseph McCarthy), the Gershwin show Funny Face (with Paul Gerard Smith), and The Five O'Clock Girl (again with Bolton; it also played in the West End in 1929). In 1928, Thompson co-wrote Here's Howe and wrote another Gershwin musical, Treasure Girl. Thompson's last Broadway success of the inter-war years was Sons O' Guns, in 1929.

=== Later years ===
Returning to London, Thompson continued to write musicals, with Bolton and others. None of his 1930s shows were smash hits like the Broadway shows of the late 1920s, but many were solid successes, including Seeing Stars (1935), Going Places (1936), Swing Along (1936) and Magyar Melody (1939). The last of these made history on 27 March 1939 as the first musical to be broadcast directly from a theatre and shown on television. Thompson and Bolton had a final Broadway hit with Follow the Girls, which ran for almost 900 performances in 1944. The cast included Jackie Gleason.

Thompson had a stage and screen hit (1936) with This'll Make You Whistle in collaboration with Eric Maschwitz, and the two were working on a new show in 1949 when Thompson died suddenly. The obituary notice in The Times said of him: "To the [theatrical] profession he was the man to whom all turned for years in the knowledge that from his pen there would come just the right mixture to give each member of the cast the chance to shine in his or her particular way and so ensure the success of a venture which, as with all musical comedy, for all its surface gaiety, is a serious business risk."

Thompson died in London at the age of 65.
