= Cicely Courtneidge =

British actress (1893–1980)

Dame Cicely Courtneidge DBE
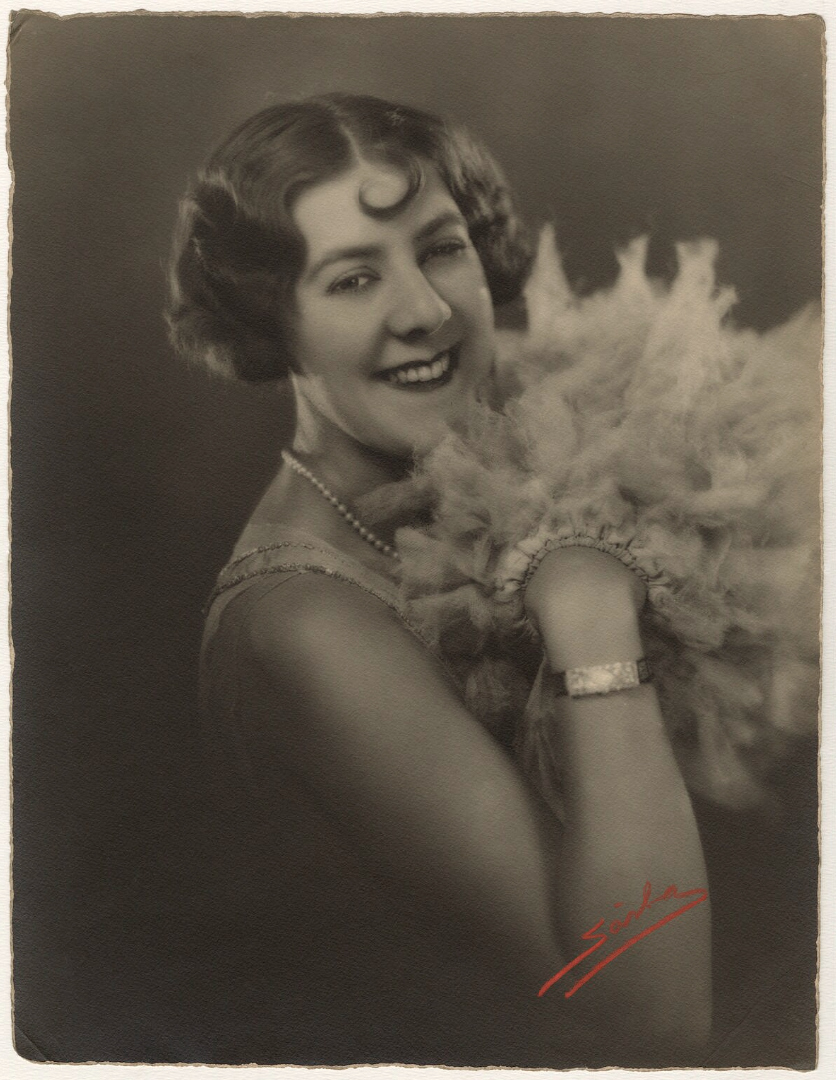
- Courtneidge in Lino Lady, 1925.
- Born: Esmerelda Cicely Courtneidge; 1 April 1893; Sydney, New South Wales, Australia
- Died: 26 April 1980 (aged 87); Putney, London, England
- Occupations: Actress; comedian; singer
- Spouse: Jack Hulbert (m. 1916; died 1978)
- Parents: Robert Courtneidge; Rosaline May Adams

Dame Esmerelda Cicely Courtneidge (1 April 1893 – 26 April 1980) was an Australian-born British actress, comedian and singer. The daughter of the producer and playwright Robert Courtneidge, she was appearing in his productions in the West End by the age of 16, and was quickly promoted from minor to major roles in his Edwardian musical comedies.

After the outbreak of the First World War, her father had a series of failures and temporarily withdrew from production. No other producers offered the young Courtneidge leading roles in musical comedies, and she turned instead to the music hall, learning her craft as a comedian. In 1916 she married the actor and dancer Jack Hulbert, with whom she formed a professional as well as a matrimonial partnership that lasted until his death 62 years later. They acted together on stage and screen, initially in a series of revues, with Hulbert frequently producing as well as performing.

Courtneidge appeared in 12 British films in the 1930s, and one in Hollywood, finding this work to be very lucrative. She and Hulbert also recorded for Columbia and His Master's Voice, returning to the stage in the late 1930s. During the Second World War, Courtneidge entertained the armed forces and raised funds for the troops. She then had a long run in Under the Counter, a comedy in which she received glowing notices. Notable among her other successes was Courtneidge's performance in Ivor Novello's musical Gay's the Word from 1951 to 1952. During the rest of the decade, she focused on revues and straight plays.

After the mid-1960s, Courtneidge concentrated on the non-musical theatre, appearing in the West End and on tour in a range of plays, both serious and comic. While appearing in her last West End run in 1971, she celebrated 70 years on the stage. Afterwards, she continued to work for a further five years before retiring.

== Life and career ==
=== Early years ===
In The Arcadians, 1909

Courtneidge, the elder daughter and second of three children, was born in Sydney to a theatrical family, while her father was touring Australia with the J. C. Williamson company. The family returned to England in 1894. Her parents were the Scottish producer and actor Robert Courtneidge and his wife, Rosaline May (née Adams), who worked under the stage name Rosie Nott. Rosaline was the daughter of the singer and actress Cicely Nott and the sister of three other actresses, including Ada Blanche, a well-known pantomime star. In 1901, at the age of eight, Courtneidge made her stage debut as the fairy Peaseblossom in her father's production of A Midsummer Night's Dream at the Prince's Theatre, Manchester.

Courtneidge was educated in England and, for two teenage years, in Switzerland. (Note: After beginning her acting career, she attended the Royal Academy of Music where she was, she said, one of the worst pianists ever to train there.) On returning from the latter, aged 15, she embarked on an acting career, with the approval and encouragement of her parents. Robert Courtneidge cast her in small ingénue roles in his productions. Her London West End debut was at the Apollo Theatre in the comic opera Tom Jones (1907), which had a libretto co-written by her father. Her first starring role was Eileen Cavanagh in the long-running Edwardian musical comedy The Arcadians, which she took over from Phyllis Dare in 1910. (Note: From July 1909 she had played the smaller soubrette role of Crysea.) In the piece that followed, The Mousmé (1911), which also featured a book co-written by her father, she was cast in one of the two leading female roles alongside Florence Smithson.

At this stage in Courtneidge's career, there was some feeling in theatrical circles that her elevation to star status was largely due to her being Robert Courtneidge's daughter. Reviewing The Mousmé, The Observer wrote that the co-authors had "failed to supply any adequate dramatic raison d'être for the prominent character of Miyo, a fair-haired Japanese damsel, embodied by Miss Cicely Courtneidge with much sprightliness but far too much effort, facial and otherwise, of coy significance." The Times liked her better and praised her "pretty impudence and roguery".

Advertisement for The Pearl Girl, 1913

Courtneidge continued to star in her father's productions. In September 1913, she played the part of Lady Betty Biddulph in the musical comedy The Pearl Girl. The cast included Ada Blanche; this was the third successive production in which aunt and niece had appeared together. Also in the cast, in the role of Robert Jaffray, was the 21-year-old Jack Hulbert, making his professional debut after success as an amateur while a Cambridge undergraduate. In June 1914, Courtneidge and Hulbert starred together in The Cinema Star, an adaptation by Hulbert and Harry Graham of Die Kino-Königin, a 1913 German comic opera by Jean Gilbert. The piece was a hit for Courtneidge and her father, playing to full houses at the Shaftesbury Theatre until Britain and Germany went to war in August 1914; anti-German sentiment brought the run to an abrupt halt.

In 1914, Courtneidge and Hulbert became engaged to be married, but their plans were delayed by Robert Courtneidge's insistence that they should wait for two years before marrying. They complied with this injunction and did not marry until February 1916. Soon after the outbreak of war, Hulbert joined the army. Courtneidge continued to appear in her father's productions in the West End and on tour. These were revivals of The Arcadians and The Pearl Girl and three unsuccessful new shows, The Light Blues, My Lady Frayle and Oh, Caesar! (all 1916).

The failures put her father temporarily out of business, and as no other producer invited her to star in musical comedy, she turned instead to music hall variety shows. The Times later wrote that this was the first step in a new career as "a comedienne specializing in cameo character sketches". After an early variety engagement in Manchester, the critic of The Manchester Guardian wrote of her "pleasant voice and much charm of manner" in sketches and songs: "one may express a preference for Miss Courtneidge as the hospital sister, presented with all the bright graciousness which properly belongs to the character, over her more elaborate representation of the Flying Corps 'knut'." (Note: A "knut", defined by the Oxford English Dictionary as "a fashionable or showy young man", was a popular term in early 20th century England, celebrated in Arthur Wimperis's song about "Gilbert the Filbert, The Colonel of the Knuts.")

Courtneidge later recalled of her first years on the halls, "When I started, my name was in such small print you could hardly read it. Music hall is the toughest thing in the world. ... I often used to get the bird, and I've had pennies thrown at me many a time." Nevertheless, she mastered the genre, according to her biographer Derek Pepys-Whiteley:

There was about her a buoyancy and gaiety, an indefinable zest, which held the attention. With her tuneful voice, forceful humour, and vital personality, no one knew better how to get the right song across to an audience. [By] 1918 she had firmly established herself as a music-hall artiste, both in the provinces and in London.

=== Courtneidge and Hulbert partnership ===
Jack Hulbert in 1921

Having discovered that she seemed more suited to comedy than romantic leads, Courtneidge continued to perform in variety and made her debut in pantomime in 1918. She and Hulbert planned to work together in "light-hearted humour and burlesque, in revue and musical comedy". Their first revue was Ring Up, by Eric Blore and Ivy St. Helier, at the Royalty Theatre in 1921; they received good notices, but the material was weak, and the show was not a great success. Courtneidge returned to variety, appearing at the London Coliseum in 1922.

In 1923, Courtneidge and Hulbert appeared in The Little Revue, produced by Hulbert. The Times wrote of the show, "there is no reason why it should not have a dozen successors, all as good." There were, in fact, five successors, described by Pepys-Whiteley as "a series of uninterrupted successes throughout eight years, in which both partners had star parts." (Note: The five successors were By-the-Way (1925–26), Lido Lady (1926–27), Clowns in Clover (1927–29), The House that Jack Built (1929–30), and Folly to be Wise (1931).) These shows played in the West End and on tour in the UK, and in 1925 the Hulberts made their Broadway debut in their current revue, By-the-Way. The New York Times found the show "beguiling". The fourth in the series, Clowns in Clover, contained one of Courtneidge's most celebrated sketches, "Double Damask", by Dion Titheradge, in which her character, Mrs. Spooner, and two shop assistants become entangled in tongue-twisters. When Courtneidge's 1932 recording of the sketch was reissued in 1972, The Gramophone said, "it is an enduring classic comedy sketch as funny now as it was then". (Note: Courtneidge's character, Mrs. Spooner, is attempting to order "Two dozen double damask dinner napkins." After she has tied herself and the two shop assistants in tongue-twisting knots, she ends the sketch with the line, "Oh, blast! Give me twenty-four serviettes." Courtneidge reprised the sketch on BBC television in the series Before the Fringe a few years before the recording's reissue.)

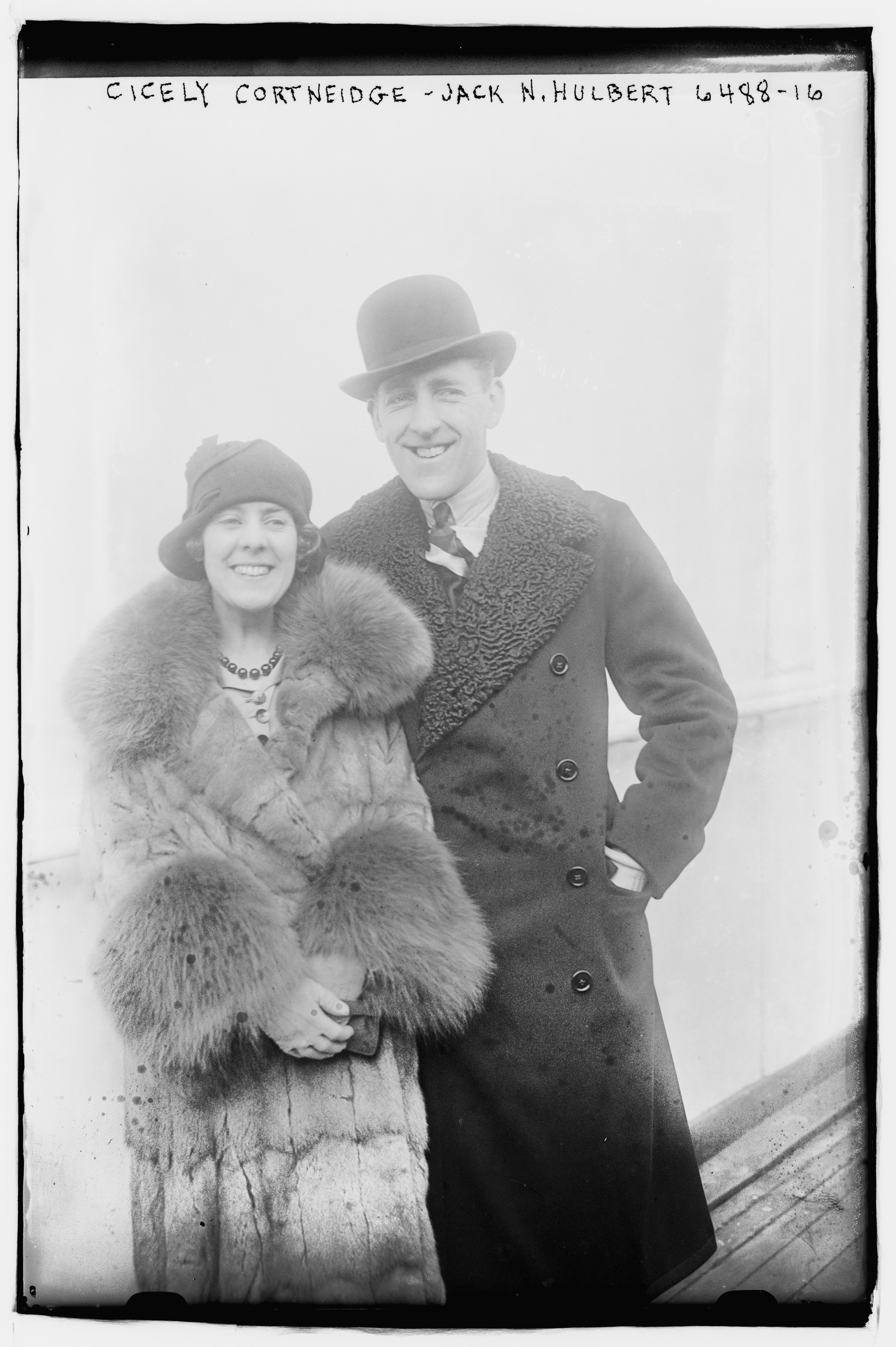
Courtneige with Hulbert

In 1931 Courtneidge and Hulbert suffered a serious setback when they discovered that their financial manager had been speculating with their money, suffering heavy losses and putting their business into liquidation. Hulbert accepted responsibility for all the business's debts and undertook to repay every creditor. To achieve this, he and Courtneidge temporarily went their separate professional ways, reasoning that they could earn more as individual stars than as a double act. A boom in the film industry enabled both to earn large sums; Courtneidge appeared in 11 British films and one Hollywood film in the 1930s. She was amused to find that in eight weeks in a film studio she could earn more than she could in a year in the theatre. She and Hulbert managed to work together on several films, including The Ghost Train (1931) and Jack's the Boy (1932).

During this period, Courtneidge and Hulbert made gramophone records for Columbia and His Master's Voice. Both made solo recordings, and Courtneidge recorded songs and sketches with other artists, including Leo Sheffield, and Ivor McLaren and Lawrence Green, with whom she recorded "Double Damask" in 1932. With Hulbert, she recorded such numbers as "Why has a cow got four legs". She also recorded Noel Gay's "There's Something About a Soldier", which she sang in Soldiers of the King (1933). Courtneidge's solo discs include another of her most celebrated sketches, "Laughing Gas" (1931).

Courtneidge did not return to the theatre until October 1937, playing the dual roles of Mabel and her daughter Sally in the musical Hide and Seek, co-starring with Bobby Howes, produced by Hulbert. "We are very much amused," said The Times. Courtneidge and Hulbert were finally reunited as a stage act in Under Your Hat, a spy story co-written by Hulbert, with music and lyrics by Vivian Ellis. According to Pepys-Whiteley, this was their favourite of all of their joint productions. It ran at the Palace Theatre until April 1940 and was then filmed for the cinema.

=== 1940s and 50s ===
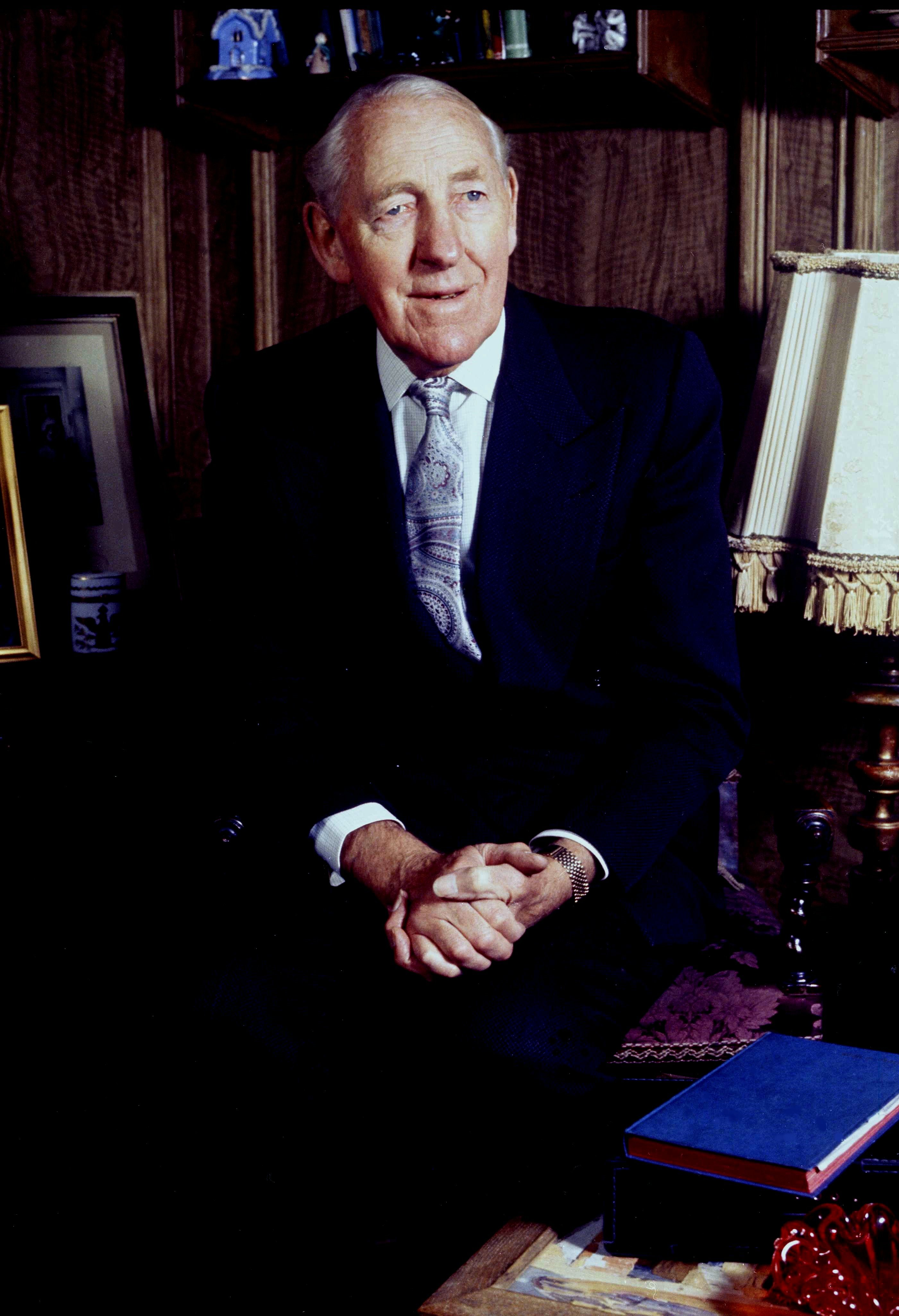
Hulbert in later life

During the Second World War, Courtneidge devoted much time to entertaining the armed forces. In 1941, she presented a nightly three-hour show, raising funds, and then formed a small company which she took to Gibraltar, Malta, north Africa, and Italy, performing for the services and hospitals. She also toured in Hulbert Follies (1941), and Full Swing (1942), which she and Hulbert then brought to the Palace Theatre. Together with other prominent performers including Robert Donat and Florence Desmond, Courtneidge led professional opposition to a wartime proposal to allow theatres to open on Sundays. Instead, they proposed that only charity shows for the troops should be permitted on a Sunday. The Hulberts appeared together in another musical, Something in the Air in 1943. The show received only moderate praise, although the performances of the two stars received good notices.

At the end of the war, Courtneidge had a long run in Under the Counter, a comedy produced by Hulbert. Its theme was the black market in luxury goods and the heroine's shamelessness in manipulating it to her advantage. This struck a chord with British audiences after the privations of the war, and the play ran for two years. When Hulbert took the production to Broadway, the premise of the piece meant nothing to New York audiences, and it ran for only three weeks. Hulbert and Courtneidge then took the play to Australia, where it fared better. The Australian Quarterly wrote:

Cicely Courtneidge radiates the authentic glitter of Shaftesbury Avenue; she brings genuine starshine to Castlereagh Street. Her comedy mainly consists of being able to turn from glamour "girl" to pantomime dame with a flick of the tail or an inflexion of the voice. Her one-woman-show in Under the Counter is remarkable as a piece of acting virtuosity. She knows all the tricks in the trouper's basket, and she rings the changes from dry humour to dewy sentiment, from song to dance, from pathos to Hungarian hotcha, and from all moods to subtle mimicry as quick as a naughty wink.

On their return to England, the Hulberts presented a new musical, Her Excellency (1949), which did moderately well. In 1950, Courtneidge was cast in one of her greatest successes, Ivor Novello's musical Gay's the Word. Ivor Brown wrote in The Observer, "Miss Courtneidge is so indefatigably and abundantly herself that it is her show or nobody's." After a pre-London tryout, the show opened in the West End in February 1951 and ran until May 1952. In 1951 she was appointed CBE.

In the 1950s, Courtneidge's career turned from musicals to straight theatre and revue. In London and on tour she played in the revue Over the Moon (1953), and the plays The Joy of Living (1955), Star Maker (1956), The Bride and the Bachelor (1956), and Fool's Paradise (1959).

=== Later years ===
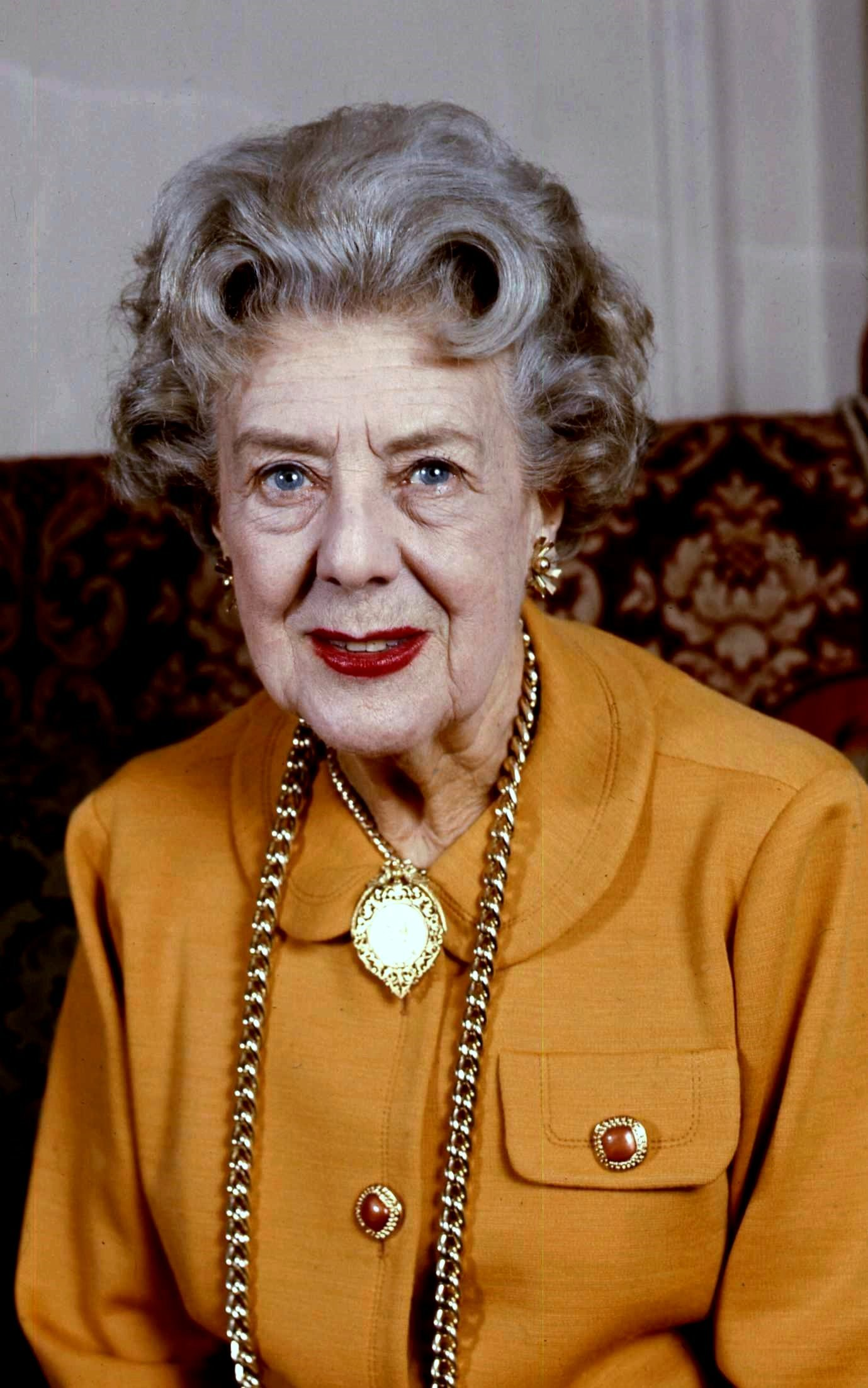
Courtneidge in 1975, by Allan Warren

In the early 1960s, Courtneidge appeared in a succession of plays in London and the provinces, including The Bride Comes Back, and also in pantomime and a re-creation of old music hall (Fielding's Music Hall, 1964). In 1962, she gave what she considered her finest film performance, in a role wholly unlike her usual parts; in The L-Shaped Room she played an elderly lesbian, living in a drab London flat with her cat, recalling her career as an actress and forlornly trying to keep in touch with former friends. The Times described her performance as a triumph. In 1962 and 1963, she and Hulbert starred alongside Vic Oliver, in the BBC radio sitcom, Discord in Three Flats (1962).

In 1964, Courtneidge accepted the role of Madame Arcati in the London production of High Spirits, a musical adaptation of Noël Coward's Blithe Spirit. This was an unhappy episode in her career. Coward himself co-directed, and the two clashed constantly in rehearsal. (Note: Courtneidge later said, "Everyone does adore him – me included – but he's hell to work with, and I never want to do anything else with him. I'd have to be starving, I really would." After the opening night, Coward wrote in his diary, "Cis also got some well-deserved cracks for vulgarizing Madame Arcati, and serve her bloody well right.") The notices for the piece were dreadful, and those for Courtneidge's performance scarcely better: The Guardian wrote of "a woeful excess of underplay", and The Observer commented, "The sight of Cicely Courtneidge hamming it until she drops in purple harem knickers with diamanté cycle clips isn't honestly hilarious enough to carry the evening."

The last London production in which the Hulberts appeared together was a well-reviewed revival of Dear Octopus at the Haymarket Theatre in 1967 with Richard Todd, Joyce Carey and Ursula Howells. Courtneidge, in the part originally made famous by Marie Tempest, won uniformly excellent notices. In 1969, Courtneidge turned to television, playing a working-class role as "Mum" in the first series of the LWT comedy On the Buses, opposite Reg Varney. In about 1970, Courtneidge and Hulbert were engaged by the impresario Pieter Toerien to perform in John Chapman's Oh, Clarence! in Cape Town, South Africa.

Courtneidge's theatre work in the 1970s included tours of Agatha Christie's The Hollow and Peter Coke's Breath of Spring, both with Hulbert. In 1971, Courtneidge starred in the farce Move Over, Mrs Markham at the Vaudeville Theatre, playing "a prudish authoress from Norfolk, bemused by all the flying exits, unexpected entrances, and atmosphere of incipient carnality." During this, her last West End run, she celebrated 70 years on stage. In 1972 she was appointed DBE. In 1976, she and Hulbert toured in a semi-autobiographical revue, Once More With Music.

One of her last appearances was in a royal gala performance at the Chichester Festival Theatre in June 1977, celebrating the Queen's Silver Jubilee. The performance was called God Save the Queen! and had an all-star cast, including Ingrid Bergman, Wendy Hiller, Flora Robson and Diana Rigg.

Hulbert died in 1978; Courtneidge died two years later, shortly after her 87th birthday, at a nursing home in Putney, survived by her only child, a daughter. Courtneidge was cremated at the Golders Green Crematorium.

== Filmography ==
=== Films credits with Hulbert ===
| Year | Title | Role | Notes | Ref. |
|---|---|---|---|---|
| 1928 | British Screen Tatler No. 10 | | Short | |
| 1930 | Elstree Calling | Herself | | |
| 1931 | The Ghost Train | Miss Bourne | | |
| 1932 | Jack's the Boy | Mrs. Bobday | | |
| 1932 | Happy Ever After | Illustrated Ida | | |
| 1933 | Falling for You | Minnie Tucker | | |
| 1937 | Take My Tip | Lady Hattie Pilkington | | |
| 1940 | Under Your Hat | Kay Millett | | |
| 1955 | Miss Tulip Stays the Night | Miss Tulip | | |
| 1960 | The Spider's Web | Miss Peake | | |
| 1973 | Not Now Darling | Mrs. Harriet Frencham | Final film role | |

=== Other credits ===
| Year | Title | Role | Notes | Ref. |
|---|---|---|---|---|
| 1933 | Soldiers of the King | Jenny Marvello / Maisie Marvello | | |
| 1934 | Aunt Sally | Sally Bird / Mademoiselle Zaza | | |
| 1935 | Me and Marlborough | Kit Ross | | |
| 1935 | The Perfect Gentleman | April Maye | | |
| 1935 | Things Are Looking Up | Cicely Fytte / Bertha Fytte | | |
| 1936 | Everybody Dance | Katharine "Lady Kate" Levering | | |
| 1962 | The L-Shaped Room | Mavis | | |
| 1965 | Those Magnificent Men in Their Flying Machines | Muriel – Colonel's Wife | uncredited | |
| 1966 | The Wrong Box | Major Martha | | |

== Notes and references ==
Notes

== Sources ==
- Castle, Charles (1972). Noël. London: W. H. Allen. ISBN 0-491-00534-2.
- Coward, Noël (1982). Payn, Graham; Sheridan Morley (eds.). The Noël Coward Diaries. London: Methuen. ISBN 0-297-78142-1.
- Gaye, Freda, ed. (1967). Who's Who in the Theatre (fourteenth ed.). London: Sir Isaac Pitman and Sons. OCLC 5997224.
- Morley, Sheridan (1986). The Great Stage Stars. London: Angus & Robertson. ISBN 0-8160-1401-9.

== Memoirs of Courtneidge and Hulbert ==
- Courtneidge, Cicely (1953). Cicely. London: Hutchinson. OCLC 559973615.
- Hulbert, Jack (1975). The Little Woman's Always's Right. London: W H Allen. ISBN 0-491-01653-0.
