= The Bing Boys Are Here =

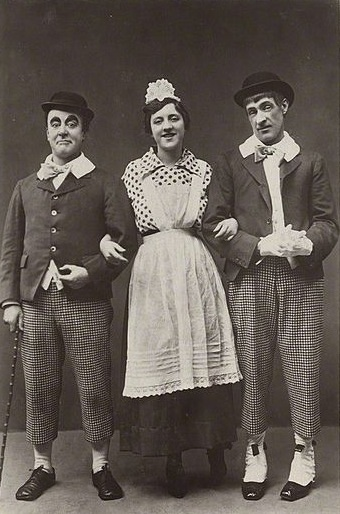
- George Robey (left), Violet Loraine and Alfred Lester
- Music: Nat D. Ayer
- Lyrics: Clifford Grey
- Book: George Grossmith, Jr. and Fred Thompson
- Productions: 1916 West End

The Bing Boys Are Here, styled "A Picture of London Life, in a Prologue and Six Panels," is the first of a series of revues which played at the Alhambra Theatre, London during the last two years of World War I. The series included The Bing Boys on Broadway and The Bing Girls Are There. The music for them was written by Nat D. Ayer with lyrics by Clifford Grey, and the text was by George Grossmith, Jr. and Fred Thompson based on Rip and Bousquet's Le Fils Touffe. Other material was contributed by Eustace Ponsonby, Philip Braham and Ivor Novello.

The Bing Boys Are Here opened in 1916 in the West End and ran for 378 performances. It was one of the three most important musical hits of the London stage during World War I (the other two being The Maid of the Mountains and Chu Chin Chow); music or scenes from all of these have been included as background in many films set in this period, and they remain intensely evocative of the "Great War" years. Other hit shows of the period were Theodore & Co (1916), The Happy Day (1916), The Boy (1917), and Yes, Uncle! (1917, also with music and lyrics by Ayer and Grey). Audiences, which included soldiers on leave, wanted light and uplifting entertainment during the war, and these shows delivered it.

== Productions ==
The revue first opened on 19 April 1916, at the Alhambra Theatre, starring George Robey and Violet Lorraine, famous for their introduction of the song "If You Were the Only Girl (in the World)," and Alfred Lester. It was replaced at the Alhambra on 24 February 1917, after 378 performances, by The Bing Girls Are There, with a different cast. It changed once again on 16 February 1918 to The Bing Boys on Broadway, with Robey returning to the cast. The total number of performances for all three revues was well over 1,000, lasting beyond the Armistice in November 1918. Recordings were made for the Columbia label in London by members of the original cast (Columbia L-1035). Odette Myrtil, playing her violin, also recorded "The Languid Melody" (Columbia L-1051).

The Bing Boys Are Here was revived at the Alhambra Theatre in December 1934 starring George Robey and Violet Lorraine. The revival featured substantial alterations to the original song list incorporating much entirely new repertoire by Grey and Ayer. The production then went on tour through 1935.

== Songs ==
Programme cover, 1916, with caricatures of Alfred Lester as Oliver and George Robey as Lucifer

Songs from the revues included:

- "In Other Words"
- "If You Were the Only Girl (in the World)"
- "I stopped, I looked, and I listened"
- "The Right Side of Bond Street"
- "A Lady of a Thousand Charms"
- "The Kipling Walk"
- "Another little drink wouldn't do us any harm"
- "Dear Old Shepherds Bush"
- "I Start My Day Over Again" (Clock Song)
- "First Love, Last Love"
- "Yula Hicki Wicki Yacki Dula"
- "Let the Great Big World keep Turning"
- "Come round London"
- "Ragging The Dog"
- "The Kiss Trot Dance"
- "The Languid Melody"
- "The Whistler"
- "Miss Crinoline"

== Synopsis ==
Odette Myrtil recorded "The Languid Melody".

B.W. Findon wrote in The Play Pictorial, no. 169, vol. XXVIII, "The Bing Boys Are Here edition", London, 1916, p. 50:

There is one characteristic feature about the new Alhambra Revue which sets it apart from most of its kind, inasmuch as it starts with a definite idea which is developed with a certain continuity that gives it a story that is coherent, and in which the leading characters play rôles that are intimately associated with the story of the piece.

In the prologue we are introduced to the Bing Boys on their native heath, that is, at Binghamton, and what more natural than that the boys should yearn for a more extensive view of life, and to that end inform their parents of their intention to visit London. The initiative is really due to Lucifer, who is a forward boy, while brother Oliver is of a timorous and retiring nature, of lugubrious voice and countenance, and inclined to a morbidly pensive train of thought.

The gay young Lucifer leaves one aching heart behind him, for Emma, the cook-general in the Bing household, has bestowed her youthful affections on the elder son of the house, and even Lucifer's affectionate farewell cannot charm away her sadness. Then she takes the momentous resolution of trying her luck in London, and she starts on a wayward career which eventually lands her into the Peerage, as the wife of the elderly Duke of Dullwater.

So it is that when Lucifer and Oliver make their entry into the Embankment Hotel we are not surprised - or should not be - to find Emma there in great form, and known as Miss Fuschia of Valparaíso. There is no mistaking the fact that the Bing Boys are seeing life, for a merrier set of people than those assembled in the Knickerbocker Room are seldom found under the roof of a cosmopolitan caravanserai.

Emma has now taken to the stage, and has won success under the nom de theatre of Mary McGay, and the Bing Boys, who seem to have the open sesame of the stage door of the Pall Mall Theatre, are being received by Miss McGay in her dressing-room. Lucifer is ardently enamoured of the attractive actress, and would tell her of his love, but Mary has the artistic temperament, and will be made love to after the manner of an operatic scena. Lucifer being deficient in vocal charm, places Oliver behind the screen to sing while he indulges in the actions and gestures of a fashionable tenor.

A visit to the Zoo naturally falls into the itinerary of the Bing Boys, and, of course, Miss Mary McGay has an equal right to go there if she is so minded. Needless to say the scene is a very picturesque representation of the Mappin Terraces and their occupants (including Phyllis Monkman attired as a cockerel, and members of the chorus as monkeys and lions, leopards and jaguars). For the last scene, we are in the stately walls of Dullwater House, with Emma as the Duchess, and we may take it that the Bing Boys are considering the advisability of returning to the prosaic environment of Binghamton.

Such is the rough outline of a story that has as many details as an inventory, and not a single one of these details is anything but a source of amusement. Of course, much depends on the artists, and I do not think I have ever seen either Mr. George Robey or Mr. Alfred Lester to better advantage, while Miss Violet Loraine has absolutely topped her high professional reputation. The cast is full of clever people, and at the risk of being invidious, I must pay tribute to the delightful dancing of Miss Phyllis Monkman.
