= The Boy (musical) =

- Music: Lionel Monckton; Howard Talbot
- Lyrics: Adrian Ross; Percy Greenbank
- Book: Fred Thompson; Percy Greenbank
- Basis: Pinero's play, The Magistrate
- Productions: 1917 West End

The Boy is a musical comedy with a book by Fred Thompson and Percy Greenbank (based on Arthur Wing Pinero's 1885 play, The Magistrate), music by Lionel Monckton and Howard Talbot and lyrics by Greenbank and Adrian Ross. The original production opened at the Adelphi Theatre in London in 1917 and ran for 801 performances – one of the longest runs of any musical theatre piece up to that time. It had successful foreign productions and tours.

== Background ==
During World War I, British audiences, including servicemen on leave, sought out uplifting entertainment, and they flocked to theatres to see lighthearted musical comedies, a number of which broke box-office records. These included The Bing Boys Are Here (1916), Chu Chin Chow (1916), and The Maid of the Mountains (1917). Almost as popular were The Boy, The Happy Day (1916) and Yes, Uncle! (1917). Greenbank had worked on a dozen shows with each of Monckton and Ross from 1900 to the time of The Boy, and Talbot and Thompson were also frequent collaborators of theirs in the first two decades of the 20th century.

The plot of The Boy closely follows that of The Magistrate, even retaining some of the original dialogue, although character names have been changed. In the Play Pictorial feature, B.W. Findon's review of the musical praised the singing of Nellie Taylor and Peter Gawthhorne, and the comedy of W. H. Berry, as well as the production in general.

== Synopsis ==
Australian sheet music to "Little Miss Melody"

Act I

Mrs. Millicent Meebles, a remarried widow, habitually understates the age of her son, Hughie Cavanaugh, to make herself appear several years younger. Consequently, the 19-year-old lad is taken for a 14-year-old boy and appears to be precocious. Hughie, that "Sporty Boy", flirts with astonishing skill with his beautiful music teacher.

Act II

Hughie also precociously introduces his step-father, Mr. Meebles, a magistrate, to the nightclub in the Cosmos Hotel. They are followed by Millicent, who wishes to warn a friend not to divulge the boy's true age. When the nightclub is raided by the police, Mr. Meebles escapes without capture, having a comically difficult time.

Mr. Meebles arrives at court just in time to hear the case that results from the raid and must, as magistrate, sentence his wife and sister-in-law, Diana Fairlie (whose lover is Albany Pope), to incarceration. Fortunately, a fellow magistrate, Mr. Burridge comes to the ladies' rescue by over-ruling the sentence on a technicality. At home, Millicent confesses that she has exaggerated Hughie's age. All is forgiven.

== Productions ==
The Boy opened at the Adelphi Theatre in London on 14 September 1917, directed by Robert Courtneidge, under the management of Alfred Butt. The production ran for 801 performances – one of the longest runs of any musical theatre piece up to that time.

An Australian production opened at the Theatre Royal in Melbourne on 23 October 1920, starring Arthur Stigant, Lance Lister and Gladys Moncrieff, where it ran until 22 January 1921. The production later toured to Sydney, where it opened at Her Majesty's Theatre on 17 December 1921, and then Adelaide in November 1922.

It was adapted for Broadway as Good Morning, Judge in 1919, by the same creative team, at the Shubert Theatre, running for 140 performances and then touring successfully. Two songs by George Gershwin were added to the score, including "I am so Young", published as "I was so Young (You were so Young)." It starred George Hassell as Mr. Meebles, Charles King as Hughie, Mollie King as Joy Chatterton and Edward Martindel as Col. Bagot.

Although the piece was revived several times by amateur British groups in the 1930s, it has not been seen since then.

== Roles and original cast ==
- Horatio Meebles (Magistrate of Bromley Street Police Court) – W. H. Berry
- Millicent Meebles (Late Cavanagh) – Maisie Gay
- Hughie Cavanagh (Her Son) – Donald Calthrop
- Diana Fairlie (Her Sister) – Nellie Taylor
- Colonel Bagot (From Bengal, Retired) – C. M. Lowne
- Albany Pope (of Lloyd's) – Peter Gawthorne
- Joy Chatterton (a Flapper) – Billie Carleton (replaced in 1918 by Nellie Briercliffe)
- Katie Muirhead (Hughie's Music Mistress) – Heather Thatcher
- Mr. Burridge (Magistrate of Bromley Street Police Court) – W. H. Rawlins
- Juniori Fratti (Proprietor of the Cosmos) – André Randall
- Napoleon (a Waiter) – T. Del Lungo
- Mr. Honeyball (Chief Clerk at Bromley Street) – George Elton
- Inspector Eason, Sergeant Dix, and Constable Styles (of the Metropolitan Police) – F. Russell, W. Matthews and George Wilson
- Cash (Servant at the Meebles') – Eddie Garr
- Turner (Maid at the Meebles') – Dorothy Munroe
- Cuthbert Sutton, Lyall Hewson-Galway, and an Elderly Lady (Guests at the Meebles') – R. G. Sydney, H. B. Lane and Marie Clavering
- Tich Ridley (a Young Man) – P. Madgewick
- Doris Cuddley and Winnie Sweet (Friends of Joy) – Gwen Hughes and Dora Fraser
- Principal dancers – Betty Blake and Jean Castaner

== Musical numbers ==
Meebles, Hughie and Burridge, watched by Millicent and Diana

ACT I – Mr. Meebles' House at West Hampstead

- No. 1 – Introduction & Chorus – "We will finish the rub and we've only to pay"
- No. 2 – Joy & Chorus – "There are lots of games with childish names, and I know ev'ry one of them"
- No. 3 – Katie, Joy & Hughie – "When you see a lady talking to a friend, why d'you want to interfere?"
- No. 4 – Diana & Pope – "I'm kept busy all day in a general way"
- No. 5 – Millicent, Diana, Hughie, Burridge & Meebles – "This is the day of young folks"
- No. 6 – Millicent & Chorus – "When I used to go to school some time ago, no one thought I was a fool"
- No. 7 – Millicent & Meebles – "All my life through I have yearn'd for Romance"
- No. 8 – Diana & Chorus – "I've some news to tell – you will never guess!"
- No. 9 – Meebles – "When first I practised at the Bar, and earned my reputation"
- No. 10 – Chorus – "Oh, we now must say goodbye, for we really must be going"
- No. 11 – End of Act I

Millicent Meebles and her sister under arrest

ACT II – Scene 1 – The Cosmos Hotel, Verrey Street, London W.C.

- No. 12 – Introduction and Dance – "Cheer O! Keep your toes a-wagging"
- No. 13 – Joy & Chorus – "It's hard to make my mind up when I am at a ball"
- No. 14 – Pope – "I'm absolutely fed up with all the female sex!"
- No. 15 – Meebles & Hughie, with Chorus – "When two young fellows like us go out upon the spree"
- No. 16 – Diana & Chorus – "There lived a little maid, and oh, her heart was light" ("Little Miss Melody")
- No. 17 – Dance
- No. 18 – Diana & Pope – "I fear I've been a bit of a fool, though as a rule I'm pretty cool" ("Have a Heart")
- No. 19 – Joy, Hughie & Meebles, with Chorus – "The girls all listen and their bright eyes glisten"
- No. 20 – Finale – Scene 1 – "We're stiff and stolid, large and solid representatives of the law"

ACT II – Scene 2 – The Magistrate's Room, Bromley Street

- No. 21 – Meebles – "Ah, can it be? A few short hours ago my heart was light" ("When the Heart Is Young")

Meebles bursts into the magistrates' room

ACT II – Scene 3 – The Garden of Meebles' House

- No. 22 – Chorus – "Pansy Day! Pansy Day! Here are some flow'rs for you"
- No. 23 – Meebles & Chorus – "I've not had so much as a wink all the night – it's distressing!"
- No. 24 – Millicent & Diana – "I am feeling quite a wreck ... Well, you are a trifle torn!"
- No. 25 – Finale Act II – "They'll be sporty boys! Rollicking rorty-torty boys!"

Supplementary items:

- No. 26 – Diana & Pope – "Why do you seem cold, uncaring, oh! you beautiful maid?"
- No. 27 – Meebles – "The years roll back; once more I seem to be a rosy-cheek'd and pudding-faced young urchin"
- No. 28 – Diana – "When a girl comes out and goes about to lots of dinners, and dances"
- No. 29 – Millicent & Meebles – "Horatio, do you remember? ... My dearest, how could I forget?"
- No. 30 – Joy & Hughie, with Chorus – "Little Dicky was a wonder at any sort of dance"
