= The Ghost Train (1931 film) =

1931 film

- The film's main characters in the station's waiting room
- Directed by: Walter Forde
- Written by: Lajos Bíró; Angus MacPhail; Sidney Gilliat
- Based on: The Ghost Train by Arnold Ridley
- Produced by: Michael Balcon; Phil C. Samuel
- Starring: Jack Hulbert; Cicely Courtneidge; Ann Todd; Cyril Raymond
- Cinematography: Leslie Rowson
- Edited by: Ian Dalrymple
- Production company: Gainsborough Pictures
- Distributed by: Woolf & Freedman Film Service
- Release date: 21 September 1931
- Running time: 71 minutes
- Country: United Kingdom
- Language: English

The Ghost Train is a 1931 British comedy thriller film directed by Walter Forde and starring Jack Hulbert, Cicely Courtneidge and Ann Todd. It was written by Lajos Bíró, Angus MacPhail and Sidney Gilliat based on the 1923 play The Ghost Train by Arnold Ridley. The film's art direction was by Walter Murton.

== Preservation status ==
In 1992 the British Film Institute classed The Ghost Train as a lost film, included in its campaign to locate missing films. It was subsequently found and it now held in the BFI National Archive.

In 1979 the comedian Bob Monkhouse, an expert on the history of silent cinema and a film collector, owned an intact copy of the full film and many others that were abruptly seized by the police. The case went to trial for eleven days before the judge dismissed the jury and told Monkhouse there was no case to answer. All charges were dropped, but law enforcement incinerated this film and others.

== Plot ==
On a speeding train, Teddy Deakin pulls the emergency communication cord, stopping the train. He and his fellow passengers are obliged to spend the night in a nearby eerie isolated station. The grumpy stationmaster, Saul Hodgkin, tries to get rid of them by telling a scary story about a Ghost Train, but they nonethless stay. Many adventures later, it transpires that Deakin is a detective, and he uncovers a gang of smugglers using the Ghost Train story to mask their criminal activities.

== Cast ==
- Jack Hulbert as Teddy Deakin
- Cicely Courtneidge as Miss Bourne
- Ann Todd as Peggy Murdock
- Cyril Raymond as Richard Winthrop
- Allan Jeayes as Dr. Sterling
- Donald Calthrop as Saul Hodgkin
- Angela Baddeley as Julia Price
- Henry Caine as Herbert Price
- Tracy Holmes as Charles Bryant
- Carol Coomb as Elsie Bryant

== Reception ==
Film Weekly wrote: "The melodrama is good, but the comedy is occasionally allowed to get a little out of control, which slightly lessens the picture's:power to thrill. ... A really workmanlike British film, competently acted, and guaranteed to entertain."

Kine Weekly wrote: "Jack Hulbert plays the facetious Teddy Deakin so easily and naturally that, in drawing an irriitating type we know so well, paradoxical as it may sound, he gives conviction to the proceedings and establishes the strong popular comedy element. Cicely Courtneidge gives one of her inimitable studies as Miss Bourne, and is simply immense. ... Walter Forde, the director, has thoroughly captured the atmosphere of the railway, has made excellent use of his attractive and competent cast, builds up suspense cleverly, punctuates it effectively with popular humour, and is responsible for stupendous culminating thrill."

The Daily Film Renter wrote: "Walter Forde has done a magnificent job of work, for The Ghost Train, a very big success on the legitimate stage, has, under his direction, yielded a talkie that will appeal to audiences anywhere. In addition, he has the advantage of introducing in Jack Hulbert a comedian who, we prophesy, is likely to be a big factor in British films, whilst that priceless comedienne, Cicely Courtneidge, is equally successful."

Picture Show wrote: "A thoroughly entertaining British picture ... A succession of delightful comedy scenes and thrills, imaginatively directed, splendidly acted and beautifully photographed, with a tremendous climax when the train crashes over the bridge into the river."
