= Florence Smithson =

English actress and singer (1884–1936)

Smithson in The Arcadians, 1909

Florence Smithson (13 March 1884 – 11 February 1936) was an English actress and singer celebrated in Edwardian musical comedy. In her early career she was an opera singer. She was spotted by the impresario Robert Courtneidge and recruited for his productions in the West End of London and on tour, most notably the hit musical The Arcadians. She was known for the purity of her soprano singing voice.

== Life and career ==
She was the daughter of Will Smithson, a well-known provincial theatre manager. She was born in Leicester in the heart of England, but was raised in south Wales, where her father owned and ran the Theatre Royal, Merthyr Tydfil. She made her stage debut at the age of three in pantomime. After leaving school she studied at the London College of Music. Various singing engagements followed, and while she was touring with a small opera company in La fille du régiment, she was spotted by the impresario Robert Courtneidge. Under his management she toured in 1904–05 as Nanoya in The Cingalee and Chandra Nil in The Blue Moon.

In August 1905, she made her first appearance in the West End repeating her role in The Blue Moon and making an immediate success. From then until the First World War she made occasional variety appearances and played in a series of musical comedies. The latter included The Dairymaids, Tom Jones, The Arcadians (in which she created the role of Sombra), The Mousmé, The Sleeping Beauty, An Indian Romance and The Sleeping Beauty Re-Awakened. In July 1914, she sailed for Australia, but the outbreak of war curtailed her tour. Returning to England in 1915 she toured in variety theatres and played pantomime seasons in London. Australian and South African tours followed in the 1920s, and she returned to England in 1927. One of her last engagements was in a national tour of The Gipsy Princess.

According to The Times, she had a singing voice of great purity, and audiences waited expectantly for her trademark pianissimo high notes. The operatic star Adelina Patti dubbed her "the Nightingale of Wales".

Smithson was the first wife of the actor Dan Rolyat. She died after an operation in Cardiff at the age of 51.
