= Princess Caprice =

Musical theatre work with music by Leo Fall

Clara Evelyn (Helen) and Harry Welchman (Augustin)

Princess Caprice is a musical theatre work described as a "comedy with music", in three acts, with music by Leo Fall. The book was adapted by Alexander M. Thompson from Fall's operetta Der liebe Augustin by Rudolf Bernauer and Ernst Welisch. The lyrics were by A. Scott-Craven, Harry Beswick and Percy Greenbank. Much of the music was from Der liebe Augustin, but Fall composed four new numbers, with lyrics by Scott-Craven, for the new piece. The story involves mistaken identities and farcical financial dealings at a European palace, following which the proper romantic partners are paired happily.

The original production opened at the Shaftesbury Theatre, London, on 11 May 1912, running for 265 performances until January 1913. It was produced by Robert Courtneidge. The piece then toured.

== Cast ==
Jasomir and Clementine

- Jasomir (Steward to Princess Helen) – Courtice Pounds
- Nicola (Prince of Micholics) – Fred Leslie
- Augustin Hofer (A music master) – Harry Welchman
- Gjuro (Prime Minister of Thessalia) – George Hestor
- Colonel Burko (Officer of the Thessalian army) – Charles Chamier
- Captain Mirko (Officer of the Thessalian army) – Frank Wyatt, Jr.
- Ensign Pips (Officer of the Thessalian army) – Nelson Keys
- Matheus (Lay brother of the convent) – Alfred Clark
- Sigilloff (A head bailiff) – George Elton
- Pasperdu (Banker) – Campbell Bishop
- Bogumil (The Regent of Thessalia) – George Graves
- Princess Clementine (Sister of Prince Nicola) – Cicely Courtneidge
- Anna (Daughter of Jasomir) – Marie Blanche
- Princess Helen (Niece of the Regent) – Clara Evelyn
- Diplomats, servant-maids at the palace and ladies of the Court

One of the servant-maids was May Etheridge, who married Lord Edward Fitzgerald during the run of the show and subsequently became the Duchess of Leinster.

== Plot ==
Princess Helen, sovereign of Thessaly, hates the formality and constraint of court life, while her maid, Anna, daughter of the Chief Steward, Jasomir, is devoted to etiquette and courtly customs. Helen's bibulous uncle Bogumil is Prince Regent. He has so poorly managed the country's finances that the Treasury has run dry. Bogumil and his Prime Minister Gjuro ineptly plot each other's downfall. Gjuro proposes that Helen should marry the wealthy, formal and dignified Prince Nicola of Micholics. A head bailiff is mistaken for a wealthy banker, and the Regent and his creditors pay him extravagant courtesy.

Helen loves her music teacher, Augustin, and detests Nicola, though Anna fancies him. Thanks to the curiosity of Nicola's sister Clementine, it is discovered in an old book in the archive of a monastery that Helen and Anna were switched at birth by their nurse. Helen is free to marry Augustin, and Anna gladly marries Nicola.

== Musical numbers ==
Act I

- "Rouse up and open wide your doors" – Chorus
- "Take your time" – Augustin
- "The music master" – Augustin and Helen
- "Pay, pay, pay" ("Great sire") – Concerted number
- Finale – Act I

Act II

- "Though yesterday his highness arrived" – Chorus
- "Anna, what's wrong with you?" – Anna, Augustin and Jasomir
- "Comme il faut" – Anna and Nicola
- "La petit Clementine" – Clementine and Chorus
- "If you were mine" – Helen and Augustin
- Let's away – March Chorus
- Finale – Act II

Act III

- Introduction
- "The wedding bell" – Clementine and Chorus
- "Puss, puss, pussy cat" – Clementine, Bogumil, Jasomir and Matheus
- "A lover's token" – Helen and Augustin
- "Do you like me best?" – Helen, Anna and Jasomir
- Finale – Act III

After the show had begun its run, Scott-Craven and Fall wrote four new numbers:

- "Be my comrade true" (Waltz song) – Helen
- "Many, many years ago" – Jasomir
- "They all come under the Act" – Gjuro
- "If I were Princess" ("Born to Rule") – Anna and Chorus

== Critical reception ==
The Times wrote that the score of the piece was mostly pervaded "with a kind of decorous, very accomplished dulness, which makes us sigh for a good catchy tune, however trivial." The paper singled out the principal comedian, Graves, and the soubrette, Courtneidge, for praise, and complained that Pounds had too little singing or dancing and was "all but wasted". The Manchester Guardian thought better of the music, and considered it "somewhat beyond the reach of most of the artists and the orchestra". The paper judged the lyrics "better than such things usually are".
