= Tom Jones (Edward German) =

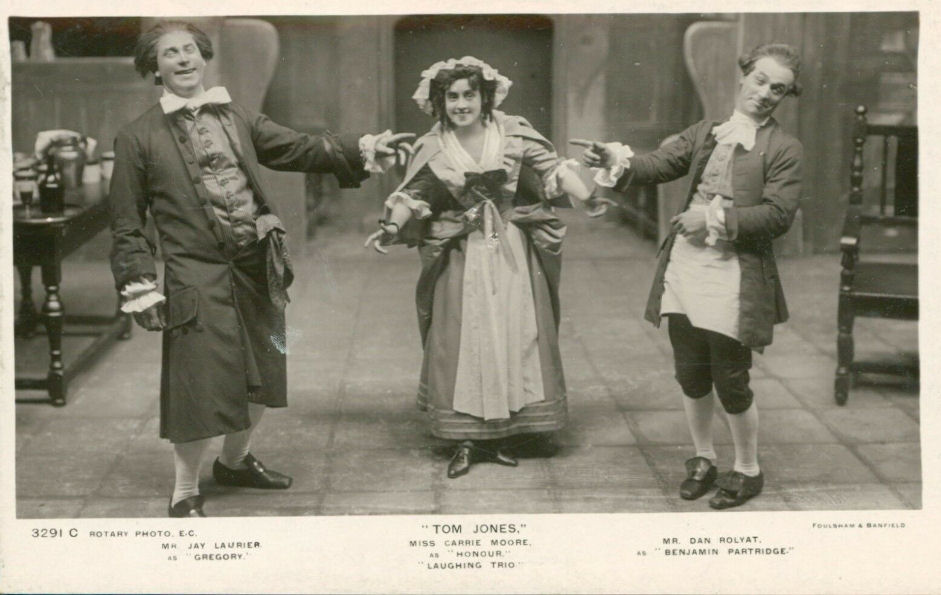
Jay Laurier (left) Carrie Moore and Dan Rolyat in Tom Jones (1907)

Tom Jones is a comic opera in three acts by Edward German founded upon Henry Fielding's 1749 novel, The History of Tom Jones, a Foundling, with a libretto by Robert Courtneidge and Alexander M. Thompson and lyrics by Charles H. Taylor.

After a run in Manchester, England, the opera opened in London at the Apollo Theatre on 17 April 1907 for an initial run of 110 performances. It starred Ruth Vincent as Sophia and Hayden Coffin as Tom Jones. The piece also had a provincial tour and a popular Broadway run in 1907. It then disappeared from the professional repertory but eventually became very popular with amateur groups.

== Background and productions ==
The impresario Robert Courtneidge, noting the bicentennial of Fielding's birth in 1907, decided to adapt Fielding's novel as a comic opera. He commissioned Thompson and Taylor to collaborate on the libretto and German to write the music. The eroticism of the novel was reduced for Edwardian audiences. The influences of German's predecessor, Arthur Sullivan can be seen in the opera's patter songs and the pseudo-madrigal, "Here’s a paradox for lovers". However, the extended finales and much of the other music, as well as the orchestration shows German's own more romantic style.

The opera premiered at the Prince's Theatre in Manchester, England, on 3 April 1907, opening in London at the Apollo Theatre on 17 April 1907 for an initial run of 110 performances. It starred Ruth Vincent as Sophia and Hayden Coffin as Tom Jones. Carrie Moore played Honour, and the comedian Dan Rolyat played Partridge. The producer's daughter, Cicely Courtneidge, made her professional début in the small rôle of Rosie. Costume designs were by C. Wilhelm.

Audiences and critics both received Tom Jones enthusiastically. The critic Neville Cardus wrote, "Next morning I heard over and over again in my head most of the melodies ... I savoured the orchestration ... I returned to Tom Jones night after night; I sold several of my precious books to obtain admission". Tom Jones was still playing strongly at the Apollo when it closed after 110 performances. It would have run longer, but Courtneidge had already booked a provincial tour with the same cast. The piece also had a popular Broadway run at the Astor Theatre beginning on 11 November 1907, which interpolated the song "King Neptune" from German's 1902 comic opera, Merrie England, into the third act. It then disappeared from the professional repertory.

Due to the perceived raciness of the original novel even into the 20th century, the opera was initially avoided by amateur performing groups, but eventually reached a level of popularity comparable to Merrie England. A few modern performing groups such as the Shaw Festival have found the libretto to be an excessively diluted version of the original novel and have produced rewritten versions with revised lyrics and dialogue. Richard Traubner asked in Opera News:

But does a Tom Jones that pleased a refined Edwardian clientele still hold up, especially after Tony Richardson's famous 1963 film version...? I'm not so sure. The libretto is almost devoid of ribaldry, many of the lyrics are a sorry collection of Latin locutions and/or olde-English fa-la-las, and the patter songs are pallid lists. That leaves Edward German's music, which is for the most part very accomplished, beautifully orchestrated and redolent of both the English countryside (Somerset) and London's pleasure gardens (Ranelagh) in the eighteenth century. Somehow, this composer of antique incidental music for the stage ... feels more at home in the operetta world with the Elizabethan setting of his patriotic Merrie England. One wants a saucier treatment for Tom Jones, perhaps along the lines of The Beggar's Opera. But that would deprive us of hearing German's fine martial songs; his convoluted, challenging chorus writing; some very catchy ditties for the soubrette, Honour; the famous coloratura waltz-song for the heroine, Sophia; and most important, his sweeping finales, which have a breadth that occasionally just touches Ralph Vaughan Williams territory. You may ... tire of so many jigs and other intrusive country dances, but that's Edward German for you, exactly.

The opera is best known for a suite of three of its dance numbers for orchestra and the act 3 waltz song, which can be found on numerous recordings. A 2009 recording by Naxos was the first complete professional recording of the opera, conducted by David Russell Hulme.

== Roles and original cast ==
Ruth Vincent as Sophia

- Tom Jones, a Foundling (high baritone) – Hayden Coffin
- Mr. Allworthy, a Somersetshire Magistrate (bass) – John Morley
- Blifil, his Nephew (baritone) – Arthur Soames
- Benjamin Partridge, a Village Barber (comic baritone) – Dan Rolyat
- Squire Western, a "fine Old English Gentleman" (baritone) – Ambrose Manning
- Gregory, Grizzle and Dobbin, his Servants (baritones) – Jay Laurier, Bernard Gorcey and Henry Turpin
- Squire Cloddy, Pimlott, and Tony, friends of Squire Western (non-singing)
- An Officer (tenor) – Harry Welchman
- Two Highwaymen and a "Post Boy" (non-singing)
- Waiter (non-speaking)
- Colonels Hampstead and Wilcox (non-singing)
- Tom Edwards (non-singing)
- Sophia, Squire Western's daughter (soprano) – Ruth Vincent
- Honour, Maid to Sophia (mezzo-soprano) – Carrie Moore
- Miss Western, Squire Western's Sister (non-singing) – Marie Daltra
- Lady Bellaston, a Lady of Quality (soprano or mezzo-soprano) – Dora Rignold
- Etoff, her Maid (non-speaking) – Dorothy Ward
- Hostess of the Inn at Upton (soprano) – Florence Parfrey
- Bessie Wiseacre, Lettie Wheatcroft, and Rosie Lucas (Cicely Courtneidge), Friends of Sophia (non-singing)
- Susan, Serving Maid at Upton (non-singing)
- Betty and Peggy, Waiting Maids (soprano and mezzo-soprano)
- Chorus of Ladies, Gallants, Huntsmen, Soldiers, etc.

== Synopsis ==
Act 1 – The Lawn at Squire Western's

Tom Jones, a foundling adopted in infancy by Mr Allworthy, is popular for his geniality and sportsmanship. Tom is in love with Sophia, Squire Western's daughter, but her father wishes her to marry Blifil, Allworthy's nephew and heir. Tom's feelings for Sophia are reciprocated. Western's trouble-making sister accuses Tom of impropriety with Sophie's maid, Honour, but this false accusation is rebutted and Honour pairs up with Gregory, a local youth. Blifil also attempts to slur Tom's honourable reputation, but Honour outwits him.

Blifil proposes to Sophia, but is rejected. He and Tom come to blows, and Tom knocks him down. Western angrily rejects Tom's plea for Sophia's hand. Allworthy disowns Tom, and Sophia is in disgrace with Squire Western.

Act 2 – The Inn at Upton

Sophia, accompanied by Honour, has run away, intending to seek refuge with Lady Bellaston, her cousin, in London. Blifil and Squire Western arrive at the inn in pursuit. There they meet Benjamin Partridge, the village barber and quack-doctor, who, it emerges, knows something about the foundling Tom's birth. Sophia and Honour arrive, but they and their pursuers remain unaware of each other's presence. Next to arrive is Tom, with Lady Bellaston, whom he has rescued from highwaymen. She is much taken with her gallant rescuer, and Sophia, believing Tom to be false, leaves at once. He sets off in pursuit of her.

Act 3 – Ranelagh Gardens

Sophia has gone to live with her cousin, Lady Bellaston, and is well established in London society. Tom finds Sophia, who eventually realises that she has been mistaken in doubting his fidelity to her. Partridge has told Western the secret of Tom's birth: he is Allworthy's elder nephew and heir, and Western now gladly consents to Tom and Sophia's marriage.

== Musical numbers ==
- Introduction

Act 1

- 1. "Don't you find the weather charming?" (Chorus)
- 2. "On a Januairy Morning" (Squire Western, Chorus)
- 3. "West Country Lad" (Tom, chorus)
- 4. "To-day my spinet" (Sophia)
- 5. "Wisdom says 'Festina Lente'" (Sophia, Honour, Tom)
- 6. "The Barley Mow" (Honour and Gregory, with Betty, Peggy, Dobbin, Grizzle)
- 7. Madrigal: "Here's a paradox for lovers" (Sophia, Honour, Tom, Allworthy)
- 8. Finale act 1 (Ensemble)

Act 2

- 9. "Hurry, Bustle! Hurry, bustle!" (Chorus, Hostess, Officer)
- 10. "A person of parts" (Partridge, chorus)
- 11. "Dream o' Day Jill" (Sophia)
- 12. "Gurt Uncle Jan Tappit" (Gregory, chorus)
- 12a. "My Lady's coach has been attacked" (Chorus, Hostess)
- 13. "As all the Maids" (Honour)
- 14. Laughing Trio: "You have a pretty wit" (Honour, Gregory, Partridge)
- 15. "A soldier's scarlet coat" (Tom, chorus)
- 16. "Love maketh the heart a garden fair" (Sophia, chorus)
- 17. Finale act 2 (Ensemble)

Act 3

- 18. Introduction to act 3, Morris Dance
- 18a. Gavotte: "Glass of Fashion, Mould of Form" (Chorus)
- 19. "The Green Ribbon" (Honour, male chorus)
- 20. "If love's content" (Tom)
- 21. Barcarolle: "Beguile, beguile, with music sweet" (Trio of female voices, chorus)
- 21a. Recitative and Waltz Song: "Which is my own true self?" ... "For Tonight" (Sophia)
- 22. "Says a well-worn Saw" (Honour, Partridge, Gregory)
- 22a. Melos
- 23. Finale act 3: "Hark! The Merry Marriage Bells" (Ensemble)

Additional musical numbers cut from the original production but included on the Naxos 2009 recording

- Song: A Foundling Boy (Tom)
- Song: By night and day (Sophia)
- Trio: Come away with me my deary (Sophia, Honour, Tom)
