= Violet Loraine =

British actor and singer (1886–1956)

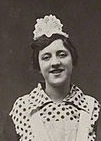
- Violet Loraine in a publicity shot for The Bing Boys Are Here, 1916
- Born: Violet Mary Tipton; 26 July 1886; Kentish Town, London
- Died: 18 July 1956 (aged 69); Newcastle upon Tyne
- Spouse: Edward Raylton Joicey MC 1921

Violet Loraine, born Violet Mary Tipton (26 July 1886 – 18 July 1956), was an English musical theatre actress and singer.

== Early life ==
She was born Violet Mary Tipton in Kentish Town, London, in 1886 and went on the stage as a chorus girl at the age of sixteen.

== Musical revue ==
Her rise to fame came in April 1916 at the Alhambra Theatre in the musical/revue The Bing Boys Are Here. She was given the leading female part, Emma, opposite George Robey playing Lucius Bing. It became one of the most popular musicals of the World War I era.

== Recording and film ==
Her duet with Robey "If You Were the Only Girl (in the World)" became a "signature song" of the era and endured as a pop standard. During the early months of the First World War she recorded the patriotic '"When We've Wound Up the Watch on the Rhine", which she first performed at the London Hippodrome in the 1914 revue Business as Usual.

She retired from the stage on her marriage on 22 September 1921 to Edward Raylton Joicey MC (1890–1955) and they had two sons, John and Richard. She returned to acting for the screen, appearing in Britannia of Billingsgate (1933), a musical based on the play of the same name by Christine Jope-Slade and Sewell Stokes, followed by Road House in 1934.

== Personal life ==
Violet Mary Joicey died in Newcastle upon Tyne in 1956, eight days short of her seventieth birthday. Her brother was Ernest Sefton, also an actor.

== Legacy ==
Research by the Kipling Society suggests that she was the thinly disguised music-hall singer upon whom Kipling modelled his character Vidal ("Dal") Benzaguen in the humorous story "The Village That Voted The Earth Was Flat".

== Selected filmography ==
- Britannia of Billingsgate (1933)
- Road House (1934)
