= The Blue Moon (musical) =

1905 Edwardian musical comedy

Florence Smithson as Chandra Nil, the "Blue Moon"

The Blue Moon is an Edwardian musical comedy with music composed by Howard Talbot and Paul Rubens, lyrics by Percy Greenbank and Rubens and a book by Harold Ellis and by Alexander M. Thompson. It is set in India during the days of the British Raj, and concerns the love of a singing girl for a young British army officer.

It ran in London in 1905, starring Courtice Pounds, and was then played in the English provinces and in America and Australia.

== History ==
The Blue Moon was originally staged in Northampton on 29 February 1904, with a book by Harold Ellis. By the time of the London production, Ellis had died, and the book was revised by Alexander M. Thompson (credited as "A. M. Thompson"). The lyrics were by Percy Greenbank and Paul Rubens, and the music by Rubens and Howard Talbot.

Courtice Pounds as Major Callabone

The London production, produced by Robert Courtneidge, opened at the Lyric Theatre on 28 August 1905. Despite generally favourable press notices, it ran for only 182 performances, not a significant success by the standards of the Edwardian London stage. Nevertheless, in 1906, a production toured the English provinces. Another opened on Broadway under the direction of Frank Smithson at the Casino Theatre on November 3, 1906, starring Ethel Jackson in the title role. The J. C. Williamson company toured a production in Australia in 1907–08.

== Cast ==
- Major Vivian Callabone – Courtice Pounds
- Captain Jack Ormsby – Harold Thorley
- Bobbie Scott – Fred Allandale
- Moolraj –Willie Edouin
- Private Charlie Taylor – Walter Passmore
- Prince Badahur – Clarence Blakiston
- Lady Brabasham – Eleanor Souray
- Evelyn Ormsby – Billie Burke
- Chandra Nil – Florence Smithson
- Millicent Leroy – Carrie Moore

== Synopsis ==
Moolraj and Charlie

Hamish MacCunn (conductor), Robert Courtneidge (producer) and Paul Rubens on the set of The Blue Moon

Jack appeals to Prince Badahur

"Blue Moon" is the title by which the young singer Chandral Nil is popularly known. She is generally assumed to be Burmese, but is in fact English, abducted from her mother Lady Augusta Brabasham, by a criminal deserter from the British army. He fled to avoid arrest for theft and took the young child with him. He is now calling himself Moolraj and plies a trade as an "idol maker, juggler and marriage broker." Captain Jack Ormsby, a young officer whose regiment is stationed nearby, has fallen in love with Chandra Nil. Moolraj has other plans for her, having promised her as a wife to Prince Badahur of Kharikar. The Prince, learning of Jack's love, gracefully withdraws and hands over his bride-to-be to the young captain. Subsidiary love interests are those of Private Charlie Taylor, who loves a lady's maid, Millicent Leroy, and the journalist Bobbie Scott and his admirer Evelyn Ormsby. Moolraj comes face to face with the Major, who was the victim of the robbery that caused Moolraj to flee England. This unexpected meeting forces Moolraj to explain who Chandra Nil really is, and Jack is able to marry his singing girl without shocking his aristocratic relations.

=== Musical numbers ===
Act I – The Bungalow at Naga.

- Chorus – If not on labour over-sweet, the lotos you would rather eat*
- Bobbie and chorus – In our dear little national Isle, I fancy no custom more strange is*
- Major and chorus – A major I and a D.S.O. who has faced the foe as you doubtless know*
- Charlie and Leroy – As I gaze with admiration on your face and figure smart*
- Major, Jack, and Bobbie – A Major bold in me you see
- Chorus of jugglers and entrance of Chandra*
- Chandra Nil and chorus – I'm a little maid, dark, demure and dreamy*
- Charlie – I've got a mother, a perfect dear
- Leroy and chorus – Little girl goes out all day on her little own
- Evelyn – I can't make out if you love me at all
- Jack and chorus – In this lazy land our distractions are few
- Finale Act I, with Jack, Major and Chandra Nil – The sun sinks down in the golden west*

Act II – The Ruby Palace of Kharikar

- Chorus and entrance of European visitors – Hushed and still the city lies *
- Major – Throughout the world I've been and seen girls of each sort and kind
- Leroy – Rosie was at school with me sev'ral years ago
- Charlie and chorus – Now children all, both large and small, when walking by the Hongly
- Entrance of Chandra – Fairest of all the fair ever seen*
- Chandra – A poplar tree in a forest stood, her head the highest in the wood*
- Bobbie and chorus – The tourist finds all sorts and kinds of vehicles to ride in
- Charlie and Leroy – Of all the entertainments that now are quite the rage
- Bridal chorus – Over away where the lordly mountains rise*
- Finale Act II – Oh, be careful of the crocodile

Numbers marked* were composed by Talbot; the others by Rubens.

== Critical reception ==
The Times made fun of the lack of plot, and said that if there were any less of a story, the show would have to be billed as a series of turns rather than a musical play. "The only things that matter now are the turns. Are they "bright" and "pretty"? Are Mr. Edouin and Mr. Passmore funny? Are the dresses splendid, the music soothing or exciting, and the ladies beautiful? We can answer all those questions in the affirmative." The Observer commented, "The specially hearty welcome accorded to the piece at its première certainly suggests that if, as some have been alleging, this particular form of entertainment is dying out, it is at any rate dying very hard, and is capable of rousing much laughter and applause by its moribund mirth." The Daily Mail also predicted success for the musical, describing it as:

Pounds and the chorus

the pleasant, light, more or less connected variety show so dear to the heart of the tired Londoner in search of a jolly digestive. What matter if the story is conventional or the music tinkly? There are plenty of neat lyrics, comic situations, and pretty love-scenes. The dresses are lovely and charming, and the scenery charming and lovely. ... [Pounds's] charm of personality was as irresistible as ever, and he sang his best number, "The Burmah Girl," as only Courtice Pounds could sing it – even with a cold. The discovery of the evening was Miss Florence Smithson. Never has a daintier, quainter, more plaintive little singer graced the boards of the lyric stage. ... Passmore danced very nimbly, and made a hit with an eccentric number, entitled "The Crocodile." ... Moore made a sly, useful maid.

Reviewing the touring production, The Manchester Guardian praised the score: "The music has not the fascinating charm of André Messager's music; it excels in a more northern quality of sentimentalism which, in moderation, does not harm anybody." The New York Times gave the Broadway production an unfavourable notice; of the comic lead, James T. Powers, it wrote, "one gets rather tired seeing him labor to put humor into lines which are absolutely without a vestige of that desirable quality."

== Notes ==
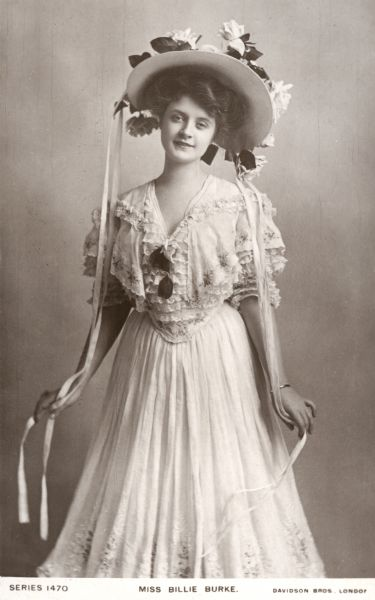
Billie Burke as Evelyn Ormsby.
