= Robert Courtneidge =

British theatrical manager-producer and playwright (1859–1939)

Courtneidge in 1912

Robert Courtneidge (29 June 1859 – 6 April 1939) was a British theatrical manager-producer and playwright. He is best remembered as the co-author of the light opera Tom Jones (1907) and the producer of The Arcadians (1909). He was the father of the actress Cicely Courtneidge, who played in many of his early 20th century productions.

Courtneidge began as a comic actor in the late 1870s, working with Kate Santley, George Edwardes and others. In the early 1890s, he toured in Australia with Edwardes and J. C. Williamson companies. In 1896, he became a theatre manager in Manchester and then a West End theatre producer. In the first years of the 20th century, he began to direct musical theatre pieces and to write or co-write the book for some of his productions, including Tom Jones (1907). His most popular productions included The Arcadians (1909), Princess Caprice (1912), Oh! Oh! Delphine (1913) and The Cinema Star (1914). He directed the hit musical The Boy in 1917.

After the war, he presented Paddy the Next Best Thing, which had a long run, and then took a touring company to Australia, presenting a repertory of comedies. In the 1920s, he returned to producing British provincial tours and became the lessee of the Savoy Theatre, presenting a mixture of productions ranging from Shakespeare to farce. A lifelong socialist, he joined with other managers in campaigning for fair pay and treatment of actors. He also returned briefly to acting. Later in the decade, he presented more West End musicals and operettas, producing his last show in 1930. In 1933 he wrote a novel, Judith Clifford.

== Life and career ==
=== Early years ===
Programme for Courtneidge's London debut, 1887

Courtneidge was born in Glasgow, Scotland. He appeared as an amateur actor in Edinburgh and later in Manchester. At Christmas 1878 he made his professional debut in the pantomime Babes in the Wood at the Prince's Theatre in Manchester. He toured with the Charles Dillon and Barry Sullivan companies, and later with Kate Santley playing Hamet Abensellah in Vetah (1886). In 1885 he played Mr. Drinkwater in H.J. Byron's Open House, a performance praised by The Manchester Guardian as "a well-studied sketch of a vain and irritable old widower." He made his London debut in 1887 at the Adelphi Theatre, in The Bells of Haslemere. His other roles included Pepin in Robert Reece's English version of Auguste Coedes's Girouette (1889) and Major Styx in a Scots musical Pim Pom set in a monkey house at the zoo.

Courtneidge's wife was Rosaline May née Adams (stage name Rosie Nott). She was the daughter of the singer and actress Cicely Nott and the sister of three other actresses including Ada Blanche, a well-known pantomime star. In 1892 Courtneidge and his wife went to Australia, where he played comic roles for George Edwardes's Gaiety company in the burlesques, Carmen up to Data, Faust up to Date, Miss Esmeralda and Joan of Arc. He and his wife remained in Australia during 1893 and 1894; he joined the J. C. Williamson company, appearing in On 'Change, La Mascotte, Sweet Lavender and Princess Ida and in pantomime. His daughter Cicely was born while he and his wife were in Sydney.

On returning to England, Courtneidge toured with Kate Vaughan and May Fortescue, and in 1895 he played the Grossmith role of the Governor in a tour of His Excellency; The Manchester Guardian wrote, "Mr. Courtneidge … though with very little vocal power, knows how to sing a patter song." By 1896 he had taken part in 19 Christmas pantomimes.

=== Management ===
In 1896 Courtneidge became manager of the Prince's Theatre in Manchester. The following year, reviewing his progress to date, The Manchester Guardian wrote:

Mr. Robert Courtneidge has made some engagements which promise to maintain the past prestige of the Prince's Theatre as the particular home in Manchester of comedy, light opera, and musical farce. Among the items may be mentioned Charley's Aunt, Morocco Bound, Monte Carlo, Newmarket, Gentleman Joe, a new play by Mr. George Dance, The New Barmaid, The Geisha, Dick Turpin à la Mode, Mr. Edward Terry's season, the visit of the Carl Rosa Company, Miss Olga Nethersole's season, The Lady Slavey, Little Tich in Lord Tom Noddy, The White Elephant, The Ballet Girl, The Circus Girl, Mr. Van Biene in The Broken Melody, Mr. Arthur Roberts in Dandy Dan the Lifeguardsman. Mr. J. H. McCarthy's new play My Friend the Prince, Max O'Rell in On the Continong, and Mr. Lewis Waller in a new play by Mr. Sydney Grundy."

Courtneidge's production of The Blue Moon, 1905

Courtneidge remained in charge of the Prince's Theatre until 1903, but he also gained a footing as a producer and director in the West End of London. In 1898, he produced the successful George Dance and Carl Kiefert musical The Gay Grisette. Among his later productions in Manchester was A Midsummer Night's Dream in 1901, in which Bottom was played by W.H. Denny and the tiny role of Peaseblossom was played by Courtneidge's eight-year-old daughter Cicely, making her stage debut.

On leaving Manchester after seven years, Courtneidge was presented with a scroll inscribed by members of the theatrical profession headed by Henry Irving and the local community headed by C.P. Scott "to one who has done so much for the honour and dignity of the English stage". His career as a producer-director continued in the West End. George Edwardes invited him to direct Ivan Caryll's comic opera, The Duchess of Dantzic, in 1903. As an independent West End producer, Courtneidge began in 1905 with The Blue Moon. He soon began collaborating on the books of musicals that he produced, although in some cases he contributed only the minimum needed to allow him to claim an interest in the copyright and royalties of the piece. Among the works credited to him as co-librettist are The Dairymaids (1906) and Tom Jones (1907).

In 1909, Courtneidge became lessee of the Shaftesbury Theatre. In the same year, he had his biggest success, with The Arcadians, which ran for more than 800 performances. This was followed in 1911 by The Mousmé, an oriental piece in a vein already familiar from The Mikado, The Geisha and San Toy. Despite a lavish production, including a spectacular earthquake scene, it was only modestly successful.

In 1912, Courtneidge joined several other theatre managers in opposing an attempt to abolish theatre censorship. The managers believed that a licence from the Lord Chamberlain to present a piece insured them against legal action by the police, local authority or anyone else. Among those whom Courtneidge joined in this successful opposition were Edwardes, Herbert Beerbohm Tree, Charles Frohman, Gerald du Maurier and Rupert D'Oyly Carte. In the same year, Courtneidge presented an English version of Leo Fall's Der liebe Augustin, as Princess Caprice, with a cast including Courtice Pounds and Courtneidge's daughter Cicely. There was some feeling in theatrical circles that Cicely's elevation to star status was due more to her being Robert Courtneidge's daughter than to any special talent.

The Boy, directed by Courtneidge in 1917

Of Courtneidge's two productions in 1913, Ivan Caryll's American musical Oh! Oh! Delphine received a strong reception, but The Pearl Girl was only a moderate success. In 1914 Cicely Courtneidge and Jack Hulbert starred in The Cinema Star, an adaptation by Hulbert and Harry Graham of Die Kino-Königin, a 1913 German comic opera by Jean Gilbert. It was a hit for Courtneidge and ran to full houses at the Shaftesbury Theatre until Britain and Germany went to war in August 1914; anti-German sentiment brought the run to a premature and abrupt halt. Courtneidge's next shows, My Lady Frayle, Oh, Caesar! and The Light Blues (all 1916, the last of which included a young Noël Coward in its cast) all failed, and the patriotic operetta Young England was only a modest success.

After these financial setbacks, Courtneidge next produced less expensive extravaganzas in the provinces, including Oh, Caesar! Petticoat Fair, Fancy Fair (the last two of which he wrote) and Too Many Girls. He directed the hit musical The Boy (1917) at the Adelphi Theatre.

=== 1920s and 30s ===
Courtneidge (centre) with conductor Hamish MacCunn (left) and composer Paul Rubens

In 1920, Courtneidge presented the non-musical comedy Paddy the Next Best Thing at the Savoy Theatre. The reviewer of The Times expressed the hope that people in Ireland would not hear of the show: "Ireland has enough grievances to go on with". Nevertheless, the play was a popular success, and ran for 867 performances. Following this, Courtneidge took a touring company to Australia, presenting a repertory of comedies including The Man from Toronto, Somerset Maugham's Home and Beauty, and a work by an Australian author, Saving Grace. Among the company members was Courtneidge's younger daughter Rosaline. He returned to England by way of the US, where he presented Paddy the Next Best Thing in New York. Alexander Woollcott in The New York Times was no more laudatory than his critical counterpart in London, but the play ran well.

In the 1920s Courtneidge returned to producing British provincial tours, including the old-fashioned Gabrielle (1921; composed by George Clutsam, Archibald Joyce and others), which was successful for several years. In 1923, he became the lessee of the Savoy, where his first production was The Young Idea by the 22-year-old Coward. He followed this with a mixture of productions ranging from Shakespeare to farce.

During the 1920s, Courtneidge, a lifelong socialist, joined with other managers including Arthur Bourchier in campaigning for fair pay for chorus members and players of small parts. Many other managements lagged behind in this, for instance not paying salaries during rehearsals. Courtneidge said in 1924, "There is a large section of theatrical managers who will not deal justly. The actor is again forced to the wall, and compelled to fight for his rights." He had earlier resigned from the Actors' Association, of which he had been a founder member, disagreeing with its closed shop policy, but his indignation at a proposed new standard contract for actors led him to rejoin.

In 1925, Courtneidge returned briefly to acting. After a tryout at his old Manchester theatre, the Prince's, he brought the old farce On 'Change to the Savoy, winning good notices for his performance in the leading role of a vain and touchy Scottish professor, which he had first played in the 1880s. Although Cicely had made her career away from his management since World War I, Courtneidge regularly featured his younger daughter Rosaline in his casts, in such plays as The Sport of Kings (1924) and The Unfair Sex (1925), until her early death in 1926 at the age of 23.

Courtneidge returned to presenting West End musical shows in 1927, directing Lehár's The Blue Mazurka (1927) with English lyrics by Harry Graham at Daly's Theatre. His last London musical was The Damask Rose (1930), an attempt to emulate with Chopin's music the success of Lilac Time, a piece written around Schubert's music. The adaptation was by Clutsam (who had adapted Lilac Time), with Courtneidge as co-author of the book. A strong cast included Walter Passmore, and the piece won friendly notices. His final production was at the Prince's and on tour, a musical, Lavender (1930), with music by Clutsam. In the same year, Courtneidge published his memoirs I was an actor once, and in 1933 he wrote a novel, Judith Clifford.

Courtneidge retired to Brighton, where he died in 1939 at the age of 79.
