= Meserve =

Meserve may refer to:

== Surname ==
- Charles Francis Meserve (1850–1936), American academic administrator
- Daniel Meserve Durell (1769–1841), American attorney and politician
- Dete Meserve, American media executive
- Dorothy (née Meserve) Kunhardt (1901–1979), American children's-book author, historian and Abraham Lincoln biographer
- Frederick Hill Meserve (1865–1962), American businessman and collector of photographs
- Nathaniel Meserve (1704–1758), American shipbuilder
- Robert Meserve (1909–1995), American lawyer
- Stan Meserve (born 1941), American racing driver
- Walter F. Meserve (1921–1984), Massachusetts politician
- Walter Joseph Meserve (1923–2023), American academic, playwright, critic and author

== Places ==
- Meserve Glacier, is a hanging glacier on the south wall of Wright Valley, in the Asgard Range of Victoria Land, Antarctica
- Thompson and Meserve's Purchase, is a township located in Coos County, New Hampshire, United States
