= Comedy Theatre, Melbourne =

Theatre in Melbourne, Victoria, Australia

Comedy Theatre
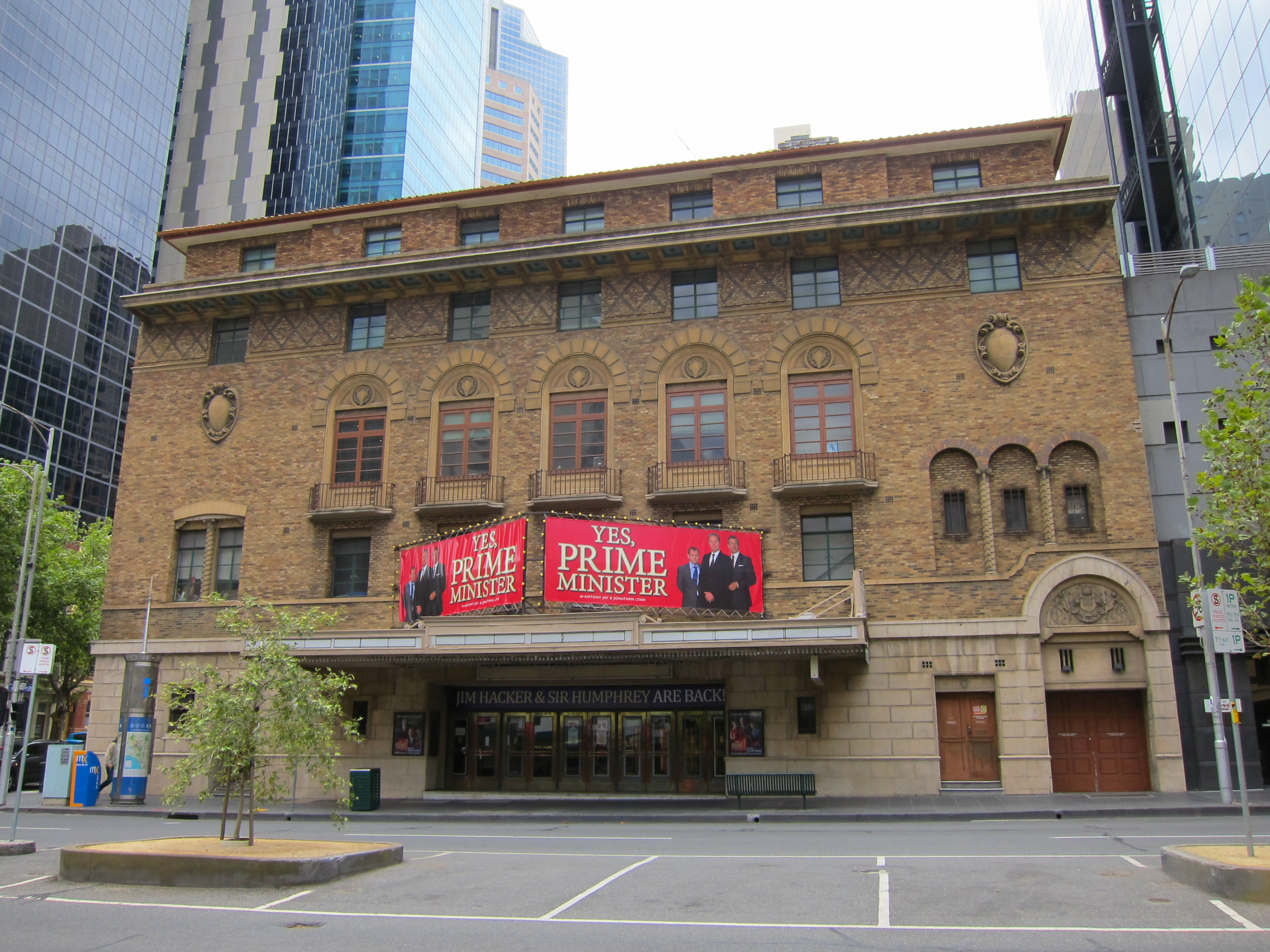
- Interactive map of Comedy Theatre
- Address: 240 Exhibition Street; Melbourne; Australia
- Coordinates: 37°48′37″S 144°58′13″E
- Owner: Marriner Group
- Capacity: 1003
- Designation: Victorian Heritage Register

Construction
- Opened: 28 April 1928

Website
- www.marrinergroup.com.au

Victorian Heritage Register
- Official name: Comedy Theatre
- Type: State Registered Place
- Designated: March 10, 2011
- Reference no.: H2273
- Heritage Overlay number: HO632

The Comedy Theatre is a 1003-seat theatre in Melbourne's East End Theatre District. It was built in 1928, and was designed in the Spanish style, with a Florentine-style exterior and wrought-iron balconies. It is located at 240 Exhibition Street, and diagonally opposite Her Majesty's Theatre.

It typically hosts commercial seasons of plays and smaller-scale musicals, as well as comedy and other entertainment events.

== History ==
The site at the corner of Lonsdale and Stephen streets was from June 1842 to October 1854 an entertainment venue, "Rowe's American Circus", where George Benjamin William Lewis gained his foothold in Australia. In December 1854 it was licensed as the "Royal Victoria Theatre", then demolished, to be replaced by a prefabricated iron building imported from Manchester, England for George Coppin. Tentatively named "New Theatre", it was renamed on 11 June 1855 as "Coppin's Olympic Theatre", and held its first theatrical performance on 30 July. One of Melbourne's earliest play-houses, it was the venue of some of Gustavus Vaughan Brooke's greatest triumphs, but the "Iron Pot", as it came to be known, was hot in summer and cold in winter. It was soon displaced by architecturally superior theatres, and was abandoned in 1894.

Opened on 28 April 1928, the Comedy Theatre was built and operated for fifty years by J. C. Williamson's. Paul Dainty purchased the theatre in 1978 for $800,000. Since 1996, the theatre has been owned and operated by Marriner Group.

== Previous productions ==
Previous notable productions and performers at the Comedy Theatre include:

- 1928: Our Betters
- 1945: Blithe Spirit
- 1946: The Kiwis Revue Company
- 1949: Born Yesterday
- 1950: A Streetcar Named Desire
- 1956: Summer of the Seventeenth Doll
- 1958: The Shifting Heart
- 1960: Phillip Street Revue
- 1961: Irma la Douce, The Sentimental Bloke
- 1963: A Shot in the Dark, Goodnight Mrs. Puffin, Mary, Mary
- 1966: Barry Humphries, The Boys from Syracuse, The Odd Couple
- 1967: Half a Sixpence, There's a Girl in My Soup
- 1968: Man of La Mancha
- 1969: The Boy Friend, Your Own Thing, Plaza Suite, Canterbury Tales
- 1972: Jesus Christ Revolution, Last of the Red Hot Lovers
- 1973: Godspell, A Voyage Round My Father
- 1977: Side by Side by Sondheim
- 1980: Boy's Own McBeth, Piaf, A Star is Torn
- 1981: They're Playing Our Song, The Dresser, Chicago,
- 1982: The Rocky Horror Show, Candide, One Mo' Time
- 1983: Noises Off, Joseph and the Amazing Technicolor Dreamcoat
- 1985: Little Shop of Horrors, Stepping Out
- 1986: Brighton Beach Memoirs
- 1987: Nine, Jerry's Girls
- 1988: The Rocky Horror Show, Seven Little Australians
- 1990: Steaming
- 1992: The New Rocky Horror Show, Return to the Forbidden Planet
- 1993: Aspects of Love, High Society
- 1994: Blood Brothers
- 1995: Shirley Valentine, An Inspector Calls, Ken Hill's Phantom of the Opera
- 1997: Rosencrantz and Guildenstern Are Dead, Trainspotting
- 1999: Rent
- 2002: Slava's Snowshow
- 2003: La Bohème, Noises Off
- 2004: XXX, Carmen, The Barber of Seville, The Pirates of Penzance
- 2005: Menopause - the Musical, My Fair Lady, Stuff Happens, La Traviata
- 2006: Six Dance Lessons in Six Weeks, The Woman in Black
- 2007: Under Milk Wood, Keating!, Alan Bennett's Talking Heads
- 2008: Boeing-Boeing, The Rocky Horror Show
- 2009: Stephen K. Amos: Find the Funny!, Tripod, Dave Hughes is Handy, Avenue Q
- 2010: Wilful Misconduct, Waiting for Godot, Calendar Girls
- 2011: Rock of Ages
- 2012: Yes, Prime Minister, Driving Miss Daisy, Flowerchildren - The Mamas and Papas Story, Agatha Christie's The Mousetrap
- 2013: Slava's Snow Show, Stomp
- 2014: The Rocky Horror Show; Mother and Son, The Last Confession
- 2015: The Rocky Horror Show
- 2016: Dawn French (Thirty Million Minutes), Little Shop of Horrors, Fawlty Towers
- 2017: The Play That Goes Wrong, Alan Cumming Sings Sappy Songs, Blame it On Bianca Del Rio
- 2018: American Idiot, Madiba the Musical
- 2019: Calamity Jane, 33 Variations, Barnum, Come from Away
- 2021: Come From Away (return season)
- 2022: Girl from the North Country, Jagged Little Pill, Six, Come From Away (return season), A Christmas Carol
- 2023: Tick, Tick... Boom!, The Mousetrap, Once, Midnight: The Cinderella Musical, Winnie the Pooh: The New Musical Adaptation, An Unfunny Evening With Tim Minchin And His Piano, A Christmas Carol (return season)
- 2024: Fantastic Mr Fox, Gaslight, The Odd Couple, Six (return season), A Christmas Carol (return season)
- 2025: And Then There Were None, The Lord of the Rings, In the Heights The 39 Steps, A Christmas Carol (return season)
- 2026: Cluedo, Art, Prima Facie, Six (return season)

== Gallery ==
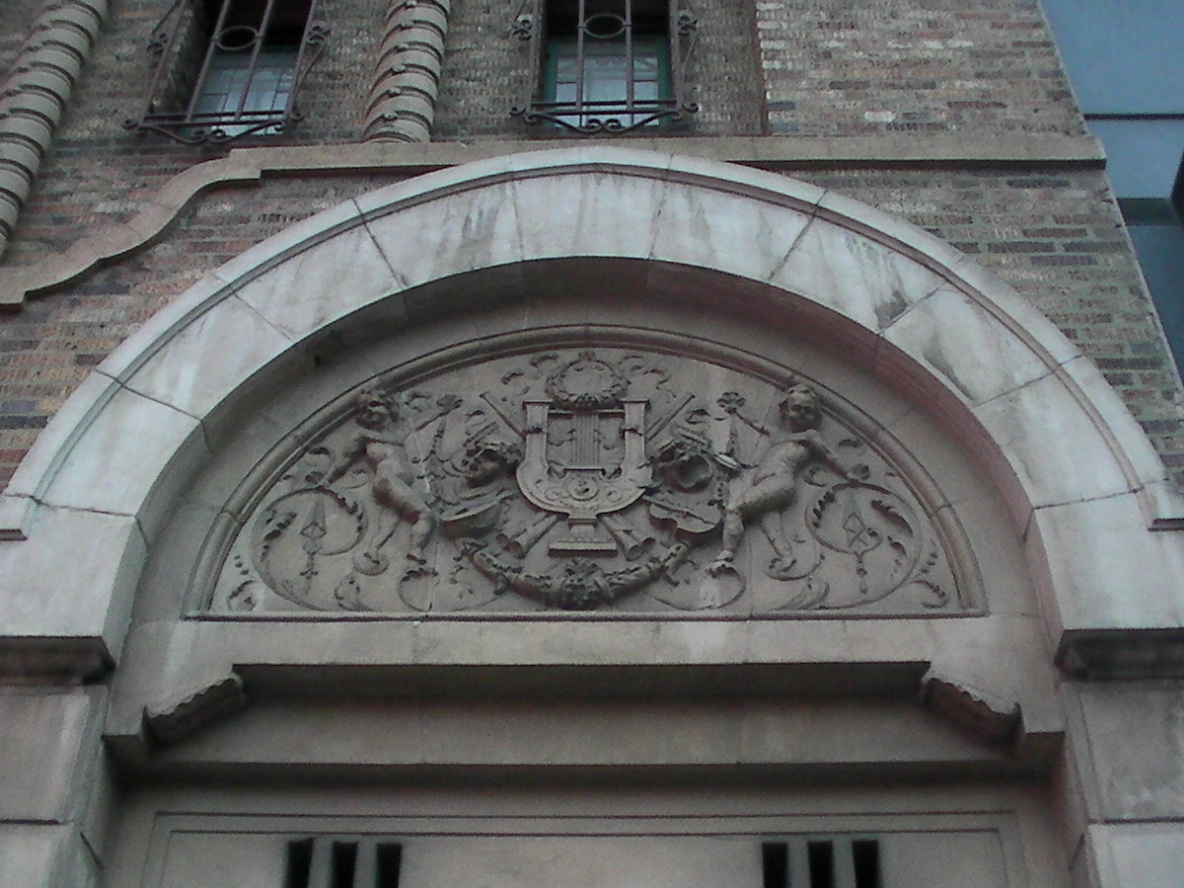
Fresco

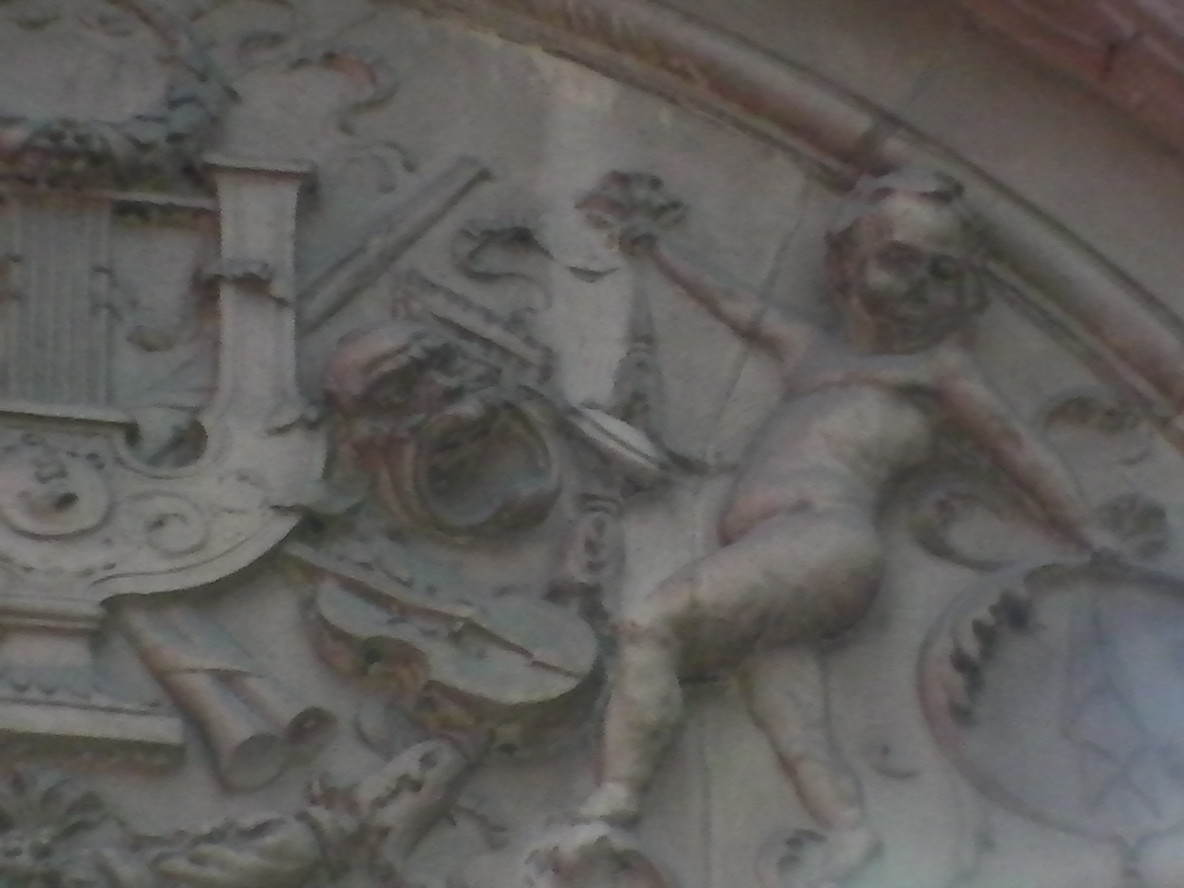
Fresco detail

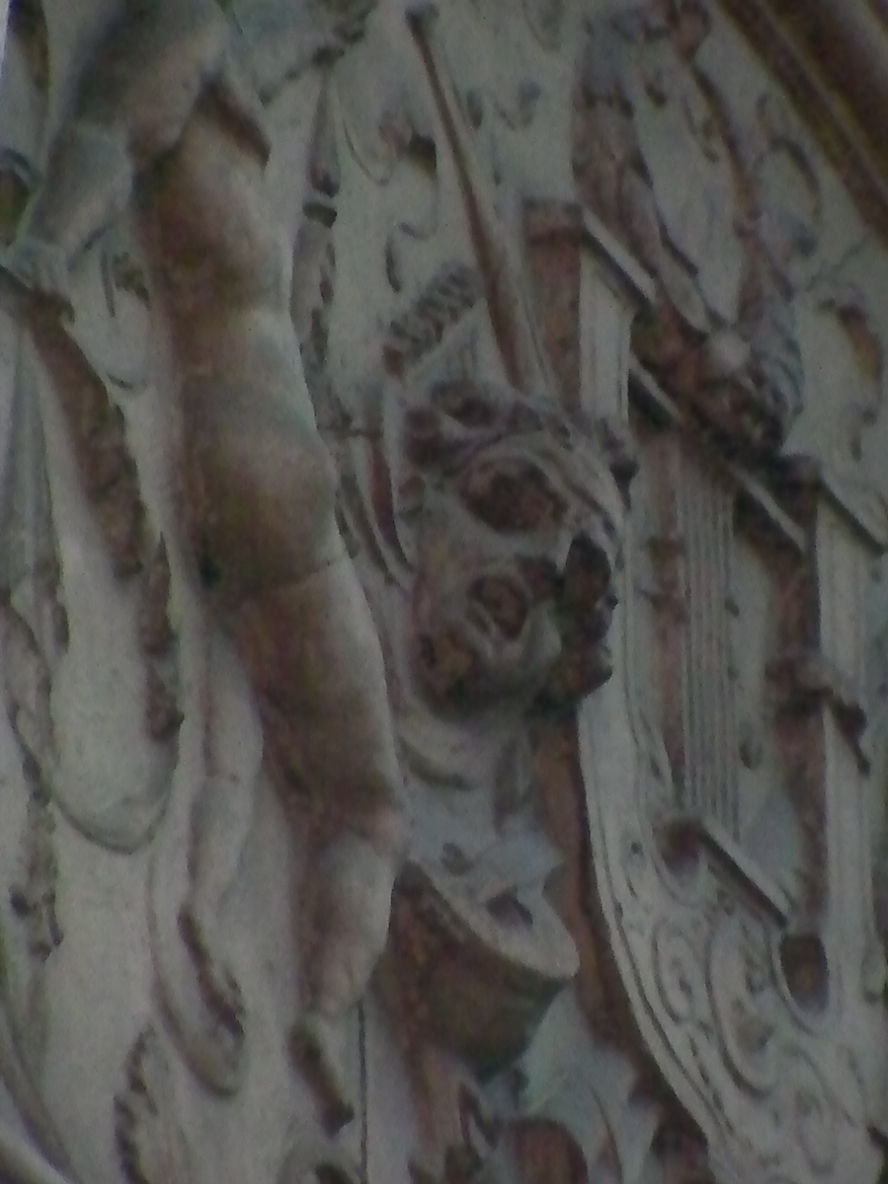
Fresco detail

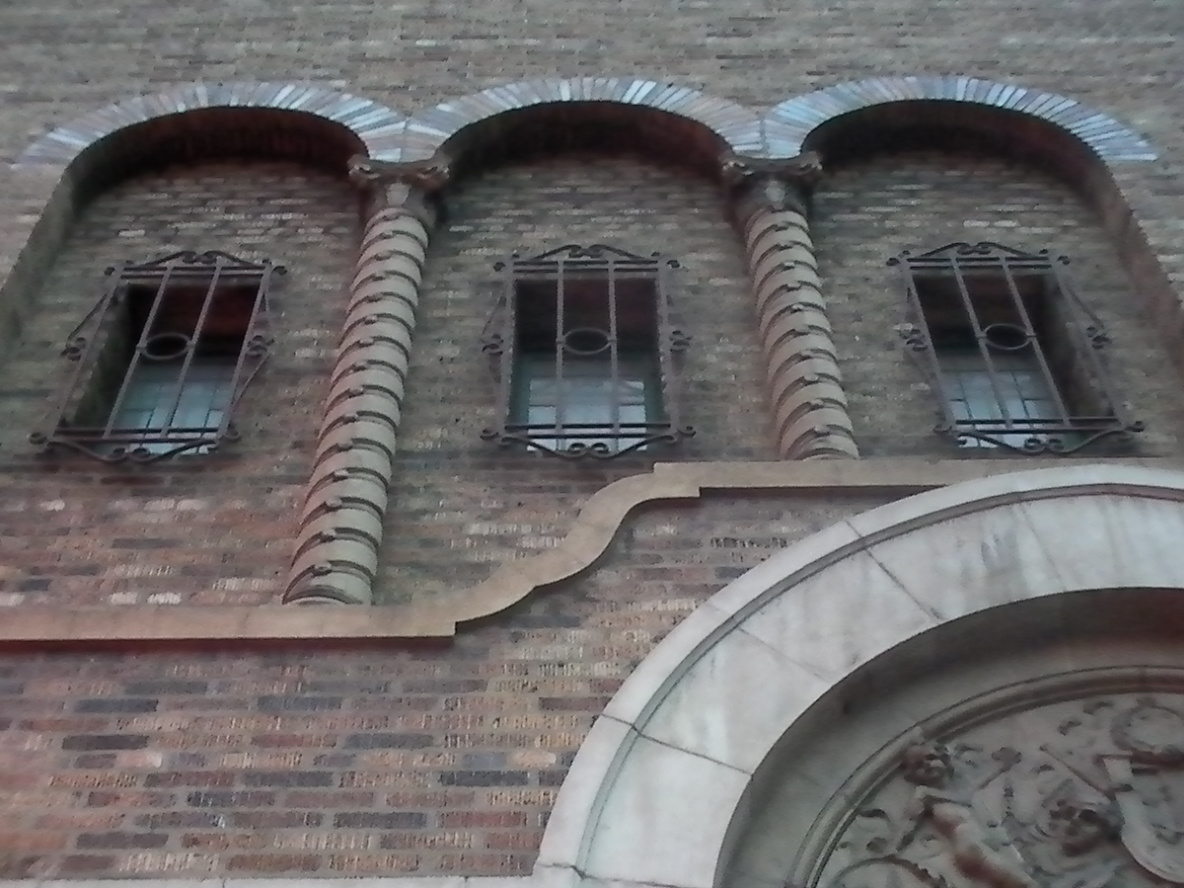
Windows

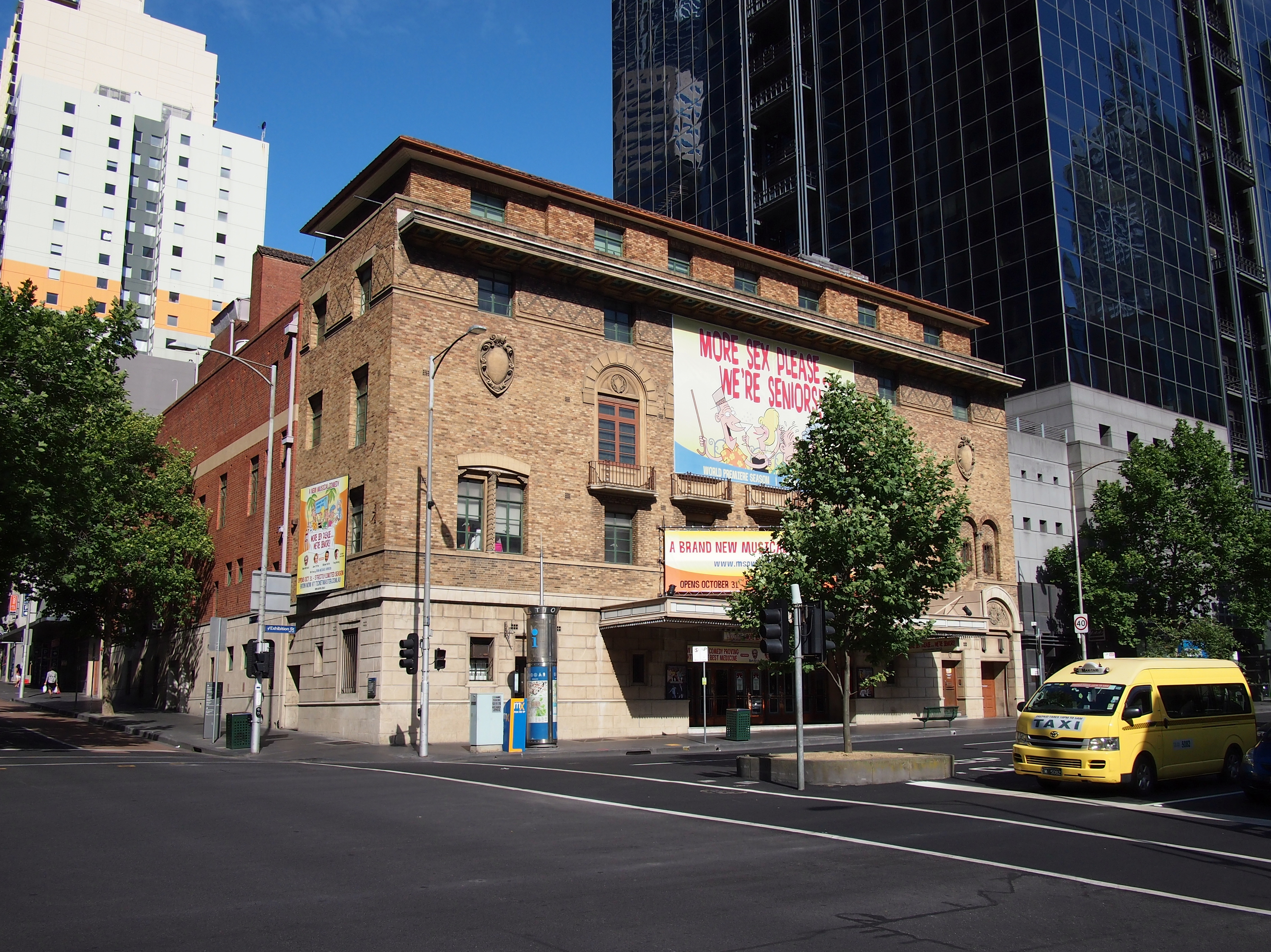
Theatre in December 2012
