= Venie Atherton =

American stage actress and singer

- Born: Lavinia Hogan c.1856-58 Cincinnati, Ohio, U.S.
- Died: October 3, 1927; The Bronx, New York, U.S.
- Resting place: Green-Wood Cemetery, Brooklyn, New York
- Other names: Venie Bennett, Lavinia Bennett (stage names); Vernie Atherton; Venie A. MacKay
- Occupations: Actress, singer
- Years active: 1865–1927
- Spouse: John A. MacKay (m. 1881; died 1891)
- Children: 2
- Relatives: Alice Atherton (sister); Willie Edouin (brother-in-law)

Venie Atherton (c.1856-58 – October 3, 1927), was an American stage and silent film actress. She was the younger sister of the actress Alice Atherton, who married the comedian Willie Edouin in 1873. She began performing as a child in 1865 and subsequently developed a career in burlesque, musical theatre, farce and vaudeville. Performing under several professional names, including Venie Bennett, she appeared in theatrical productions in the United States and Britain. Her film credits included Romeo and Juliet (1916), in which she was credited, and Jane Eyre, in which she portrayed Miss Fairfax.

== Early life ==
She was born Lavinia Hogan in Cincinnati, Ohio, the daughter of William Hogan (1827–1907) and Sarah Bennett (1832–1896).

She was 4 years old in 1860 when the Hogan family was recorded as living in Cincinnati, Ohio. Her father was a native of Kentucky, while her British-born mother was a stage actress. The 1870 census records eleven-year-old Lavinia Hogan in New York City, living with her 37-year-old mother and elder sister, Alice, aged 15, both listed as actresses.

Norman B. Patterson has suggested that the name Lavinia may have been pronounced "LaVenny", and that "Venie" developed as a shortened form of the name.

== Career ==
She began her theatrical career as a child, performing under her birth name, Lavinia Hogan, as a member of the Extraordinary Hogan Troupe of Little Folks, a juvenile theatrical company that toured widely, performing in venues across Kentucky and Alabama.

=== Early theatrical career (1865–1879) ===
In March 1865, during the American Civil War, she appeared in a performance given for the benefit of her elder sister, Alice. In May of that year, she appeared as "Willie" in "The Workmen of Louisville" at the Louisville Theater in Kentucky, in a performance held for her own benefit. The Louisville Daily Democrat described her as "the youngest actress on the American stage", while also praising her acting ability.

The Montgomery Daily Advertiser of March 9, 1867 documents the Hogan troupe's theatrical appearance as part of M. Albusi’s Southern Star Combination Troupe, advertised as "Four Shows in One". The advertisement featured the Hogan Troupe of Little Folks, comprising of Alice Hogan (aged 14), Lavinia Hogan (aged 9), Caroline Hogan, and the infant protege "Little Willie" (aged 4), with the latter assisted by Madame Hogan.

In 1875, she was photographed by Jeremiah Gurney. Patterson has suggested that she may have shared a photographic session with her elder sister, based on the apparent use of the same shoulder drape in surviving photographs.

By 1878, she was performing with Colville's Folly Company under her birth name, Lavinia Hogan. A report in the Washington Evening Star described her departure from the company in connection with Charles E. Cameron. The newspaper reported that the pair were expected to marry. In June 1878, theatrical gossip columns in the British and American press reported on her association with Cameron.

=== Burlesque and the London stage (1880–1900) ===
By 1880, she was performing as Venie Bennett with Edward E. Rice's Surprise Party. Atherton starred in "Horrors" alongside Topsey Venn, Marion Elmore and John A. MacKay. A reviewer at the Chicago Daily Telegraph described her as "a handsome young lady" and frequently noted her connection to her sister, referring to her as "the sister of Alice Atherton". However, the following year while the production was at the National Theatre, she was still known as Lavinia Bennett.

By 1886, newspaper accounts described her as having withdrawn from theatrical work as a burlesque performer, following her marriage to comedian John A. MacKay.

By the late 1880s, she had established herself professionally under the name Venie Atherton and was appearing on the London stage. In 1889, she appeared at London’s Theatre Royal, Drury Lane, as Venie Atherton, playing Alison Culpepper in "The Royal Oak", opposite Henry Neville.

At the beginning of 1890, she danced as Venie Bennett in the "pas de huit" in the pantomime "Jack and the Beanstalk".

In 1891, she performed in London alongside her sister, appearing in "A Night’s Frolic", a production by her brother-in-law, where they were referred to as the "Misses Atherton" in June 1891. Contemporary press also referred to her by her professional name, Venie Bennett, during this period.

At the end of June, she also appeared as Miss Perkins in "Katti" at the Royal Strand Theatre. She appeared in Niobe: All Smiles during 1892 and 1893. In 1892, Atherton, performing under the name Venie Bennett, was featured in Judy: The London Serio-Comic Journal in an account of her appearances at the Strand Theatre. The article noted that she was known by the nickname "Venus". In July 1893, as Venie Bennett, she appeared in C. H. Abbott's new three-act farcical comedy "The Sleepwalker" at the Strand Theatre, London, which replaced "Niobe". Her sister, Alice, was also in the cast, alongside Seymour Hicks and Willie Edouin.

She did not perform while her sister Alice was dying; instead, she paused her engagements to nurse her. Contemporary press reports noted that Venie was completely "prostrated by her sister's death" and was left with the painful task of cabling the news to Alice's husband, Willie Edouin.

She returned to the stage in May 1899 performing a selection of songs and a descriptive ballad at the Masonic Rose Chapter at the Tuxedo in New York. In October 1899, she performed the "Famous Laughing Song", a musical number associated with her late sister. The song was published as Alice Atherton's Laughing Song: Sung at Koster & Bial's Music Hall.

In 1900, she returned to England with Mrs Carter's theatrical company. She appeared in Zaza at the Garrick Theatre in London as Venie Atherton.

=== Vaudeville and American touring (1901–1915) ===
She was referred to as "Vinie Atherton" in the contemporary press, signed with Walter Hodges "Humbug" Company, as reported in The Boston Daily Globe on July 28, 1901. In 1902 she toured the United States with "Captain Jinks of the Horse Marines", a comedy by Clyde Fitch.

In October 1904, Atherton was appearing as the head of a vaudeville company and had developed an act "Where There’s a Woman There’s a Way" on Broadway, according to a contemporary review in The New York Times.

In 1906, she appeared in a revival of Von Yonson as part of a further touring engagement. In 1911, Variety Magazine reported that Betts & Fowler, a former theatrical booking agency active in the early twentieth century, had arranged stock engagements for her. Later engagements included performances in Montreal and a tour of Hobson's Choice in 1916.

=== Broadway and later career (1916–1927) ===
In 1916, she was credited as a cast member of the silent film Romeo and Juliet. The film is also discussed in Anthony Slide and Edward Wagenknecht's Fifty Great American Silent Films (1980, p. 58) and E. Sammons's Shakespeare – A Hundred Years on Film (2004, p. 115). She also appeared in the 1917 film "The Cinderella Man", although her role was uncredited. A contemporary report in "The Butte Miner" of February 1922 provides evidence linking her to the production.

In 1921, she appeared as Miss Fairfax in Hugo Ballin's film adaptation of "Jane Eyre", where she was credited in newspaper notices for the 1921 film as "Vernie Atherton", including a review in The Butte Miner, February 28, 1922. Atherton is similarly listed under that spelling in the American Film Institute. Although contemporary publicity in Motion Picture News (November 1921), as well as other film databases, identifies her as "Venie Atherton".

During the 1920s, she appeared in several Broadway productions, including "Springtime of Youth" (1922), "Sally, Irene, and Mary" (1923), Sweeney Todd and Bombastes Furioso (1924), and "The Glass Slipper" (1925).

Her final documented stage appearance was in "Hearts Are Trumps" at the Morosco Theatre on Broadway in April 1927. She died in October of that year.

== Personal life ==
On September 7, 1881, she married comic actor John A. MacKay. The couple had a son, John Atherton MacKay, and a daughter, Alice. Her husband died of pneumonia in Cincinnati in March 1891, aged 45.

Census records document Atherton's residences in the United States and England. Her son preceded her in death in 1922.

Her recorded age varies across official records. The 1860 census suggests she was born around 1856, while the 1870 census lists her as 11. The 1880 census records her as 23, as does her 1881 marriage record. The 1891 census gives her age as 28.

Although Atherton's obituary in The Brooklyn Daily Times made no mention of children, their existence is documented in birth records and her death certificate.

Her two nieces, May and Daisy, also pursued theatrical careers and performed under the Atherton pseudonym.

== Death ==
She died in the Bronx, New York City, on October 3, 1927. Her death certificate listed cardiac decompensation and lobar pneumonia as the causes of death. She was interred at Green-Wood Cemetery.

Her death certificate records her age as 52, suggesting a birth around 1875. Her obituary in The Brooklyn Daily Times (1927) gives her age as 65, implying a birth around 1862. The earlier records suggest she was more likely born around 1856 or 1858, making the age on her death certificate appear incorrect.

== Archival records ==
The Billy Rose Theatre Division of the New York Public Library for the Performing Arts holds photographs of Atherton. She is also identified in the archival catalogue of Yale University Library under her professional and alternative names.

A program for the 1900 production of Zaza at London's Garrick Theatre, held in the Colyer-Fergusson Albums (MS108/3/40) in the Cadbury Research Library, University of Birmingham, lists Atherton among the cast.

A photograph of Atherton in the Meserve-Kunhardt Collection at Yale University was formerly misidentified as depicting "Lillian Atherton". The collection's finding aid identifies the subject as "Lavenia Atherton MacKay (c. 1859–1927), also known as Lavenia Hogan and Lavenia Atherton". These variations have complicated the identification of records relating to her life and theatrical career.
