= Alice Atherton =

American burlesque actress and entertainer

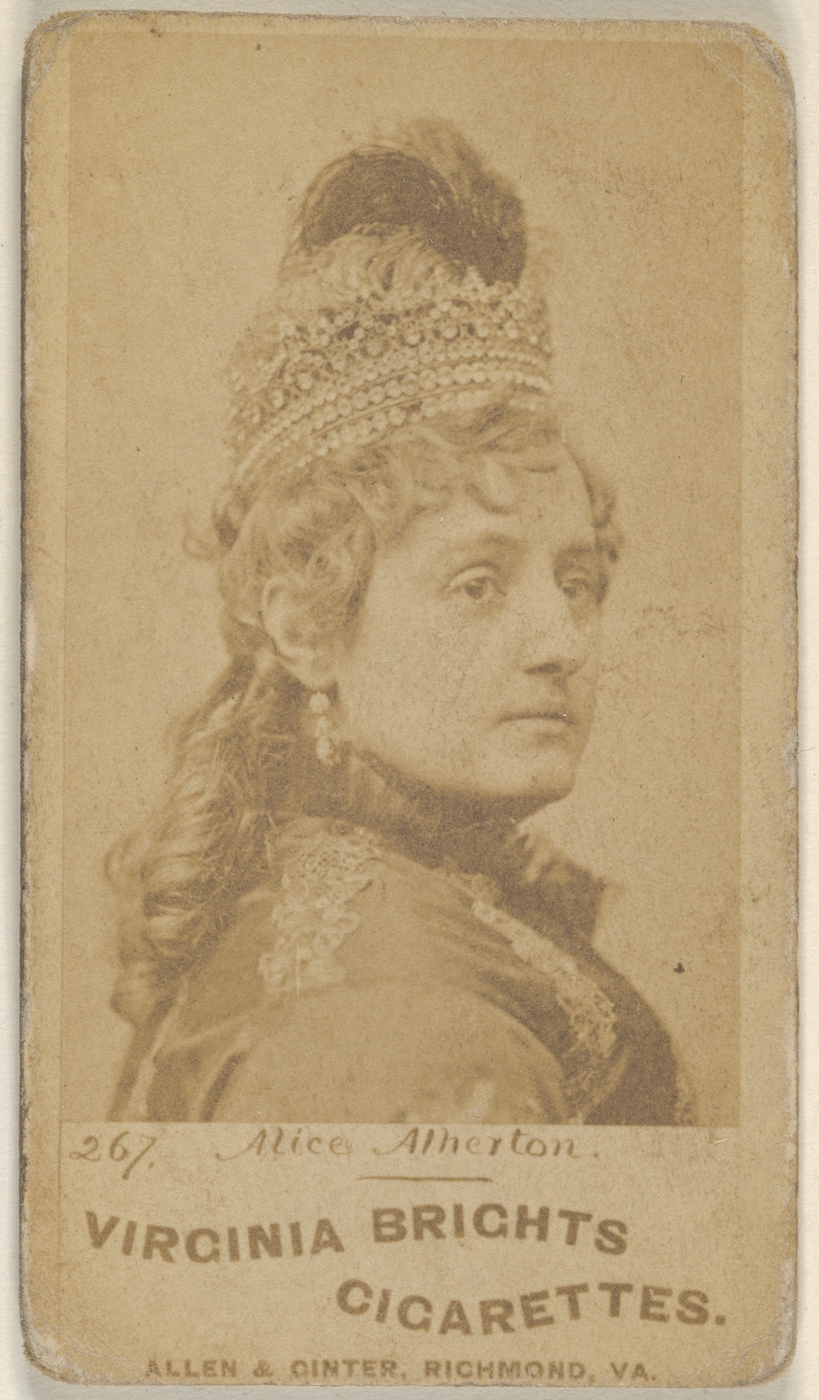
- Alice Atherton, from the Actors and Actresses series
- Born: Alice Hogan c. 1854; Cincinnati, Ohio, U.S.
- Died: February 4, 1899; Manhattan, New York City, U.S.
- Other name: Alice Atherton Edouin
- Occupations: Actress, comedian, singer and dancer
- Years active: 1860s–1899
- Spouse: Willie Edouin (m. 1873)
- Relatives: Venie Atherton (sister)

Alice Atherton (born Alice Hogan; c. 1854 – February 4, 1899) was an American actress, comedian, singer and dancer, known for Victorian burlesque and her "laughing song". Born in Cincinnati, she began as a child performer in her mother's juvenile troupe and joined Lydia Thompson's burlesque company. In 1873 she married the English comedian Willie Edouin, and the couple moved to London in 1883, where she spent much of the rest of her career. She returned to the American stage in 1897 and died of pneumonia in New York in 1899.

== Early life and beginnings ==
Atherton was born Alice Hogan in Cincinnati, the daughter of William Hogan, a Kentucky-born brush maker, and Sarah Bennett. She used "Atherton" as a stage name or pseudonym for most of her career.

Atherton's birth date is uncertain. Kurt Gänzl gives it as circa 1847, although other evidence suggests she was born in the 1850s. Her birth year is usually given as c. 1854, but her Chicago Tribune obituary gives 1860 and St. Louis as her birthplace.

== Career ==
Atherton began her theatrical career as a child performer in Cincinnati, appearing in "The Sea of Ice".

Her mother managed the Extraordinary Hogan Troupe of Little Folks, a juvenile theatrical company that toured widely, performing in venues across Kentucky and Alabama. The Daily Advertiser of March 9, 1867 documents the troupe's theatrical performance.

=== The Lydia Thompson years ===
Her talent for impersonation attracted the attention of English actress and theatrical producer Lydia Thompson, who recruited her into her celebrated burlesque company, the British Blondes. She subsequently performed in the company’s production of The Forty Thieves, a burlesque first staged by Thompson's troupe in 1869.

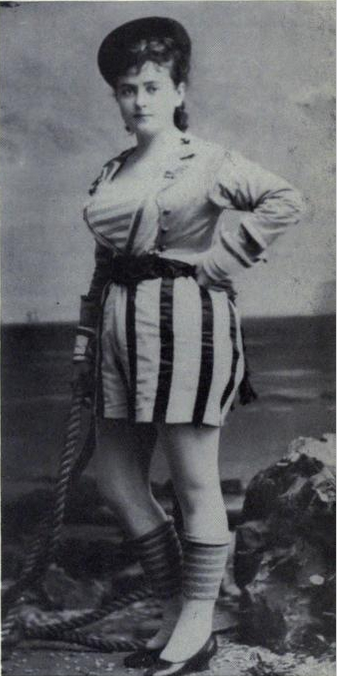
Alice Atherton in Forty Thieves in 1869

Atherton's association with Thompson provided an important foundation for her career in American burlesque. She was photographed in a series of stereoscopic portraits by the New York photographic studio of Jeremiah Gurney around 1870, during her early career with the British Blondes. By 4 April 1870, Atherton was performing at Niblo's Garden in New York on April 4, 1870, in the burlesque Pippin; or, The King of the Gold Mines. The date she joined the troupe is unknown.

When Thompson returned to England, Atherton went with her and appeared in Blue Beard at the Charing Cross Theatre, London in 1872. In July 1873, Atherton continued to perform with Thompson's theatrical company, according to a contemporary report in The New York Times.

=== Marriage and theatrical partnership with Willie Edouin ===
Atherton married her English co-performer, Willie Edouin, on December 27, 1873, in St Louis and they performed alongside in the Coville burlesque companies. Her husband organized the entertainment "Dreams, or Fun in the Photograph Gallery," a piece that showed off her skill for impersonation and popularized the comic skit as a stage form. Atherton also performed male characters, a familiar feature of Victorian burlesque and pantomime.

Edouin’s theatrical career is documented in the Dictionary of National Biography.

=== American burlesque and variety performances ===
During this period Atherton developed a reputation for versatility. She played O'Shaeabac in Blue Beard (1874).

In 1877, she took over the role of Robinson Crusoe in a new theatrical company organised by Samuel Colville, following Lydia Thompson's return to England. Her portrayal formed part of a theatrical tradition in which women performed male principal roles in burlesque and pantomime. Geoffrey Sill identifies Atherton as one of the early performers to succeed Thompson in this role. Sill also notes her reputation for versatility and liveliness as a comedienne.

In 1878, Atherton was credited alongside C. D. March with the musical work The Man in the Moon Is Looking, performed in the musical burlesque Babes in the Wood.

Her performance as an Native American woman, Hiawatha, in Edward E. Rice's burlesque Hiawatha in 1878 brought her to his attention and helped advance her theatrical career where she later appeared as Conrad in The Corsair, Prince Achmet in Horrors, and starred in the production of Lady Macassar.

In 1879 she played The Bad Man in Babes in the Wood at D. H. Harkins's benefit, and in 1880 played Ruby in Dreams, or Fun in a Photograph Gallery, a piece Edouin organized that displayed her talent for impersonation.

She subsequently joined her husband Willie Edouin’s company, appearing in Sparks and Revels, and playing Ruby Chillington in Dreams.

=== Move to England and London theatrical career (1883–1887) ===
In 1883, she moved to London with her husband. London became the principal centre of her theatrical activities during the following years. She made her first London appearance with her husband at the Avenue Theatre on 16 July 1883, in A Dream; or, Binks’s Photographic Gallery.

Atherton appeared as Tessie in The Babes in 1884, which performed at the Toole's Theatre. Her London reputation grew with Harry Paulton's The Babes; or W(K)ines from the Wood (1884), which ran for over a hundred nights. A photograph of her in this production is held within the Victoria & Albert Museum's Guy Little Theatrical Photograph Collection.

In 1885 she took to the stage at the Prince's Theatre in Bristol and the Novelty Theatre in London, alongside Harriet Vernon, Lionel Brough and her husband in The Japs; or, The Doomed Daimio, a burlesque by Harry Paulton and Mostyn Teddea.

In 1886 she appeared in "Oliver Grumble", "Blackberries" and "Coming Clown".

=== Music halls, comic singing and impersonation ===
Atherton's reputation increasingly rested on her abilities as a comic singer and impersonator.

Atherton performed songs written for her by Clotilde Graves, including Laughing Eyes of English Blue, while appearing in productions managed by her husband, Willie Edouin.

In August 1886, Atherton performed Bees amongst the Clover, Happy Eyes of English Blue and Rover at the Comedy Theatre, where her songs were repeatedly encored.

On February 25, 1888, her husband began his first managerial period at the Royal Strand Theatre, producing "Katti, the Family Help", with both of them playing the lead characters.

During May 1888, she appeared in "Airey" Annie, F. C. Burnand's farce at the Strand Theatre, as the "Chevalier Marius de Valance", a part that imitated the French-born actor Claude Marius Duplany.

After an illness lasting two years, she returned to the stage, probably in 1891, in Our Daughters, a farce written for her by Edouin and T. G. Warren. It was poorly received by the press and ran only a few weeks.

In plays presented by Edouin at the Royalty and the Strand, she appeared opposite Charles S. Fawcett, including in Blackberries, The Paper Chase, Cycling and A Night's Frolic.

In 1894 she starred as Jane in Jaunty Jane Shore at the Royal Strand Theatre.

=== Return to America and the "Laughing Song" (1897–1898) ===
Atherton returned to the American stage in November 1897, appearing at Koster & Bial’s in New York. A review in the New York Clipper of November 13, 1897 reported that she made a successful American reappearance and performed two descriptive songs before concluding with her celebrated "Laughing Song".

The New York Clipper praised her comic impersonations of different types of laughter, noting that she maintained the musical rhythm while imitating her characters. Her performance received repeated encores.

She was credited as a singer on the 1898 sheet music publication of "Lazy Bill", with lyrics by Glen McDonough and music composed by A. Baldwin Sloane, published by M. Witmark & Son in New York and Chicago. The song’s opening line was "Lazy Bill, he wouldn’t do a thing". This entry in the New York Public Library’s Digital Collections documents her work as a popular song performer.

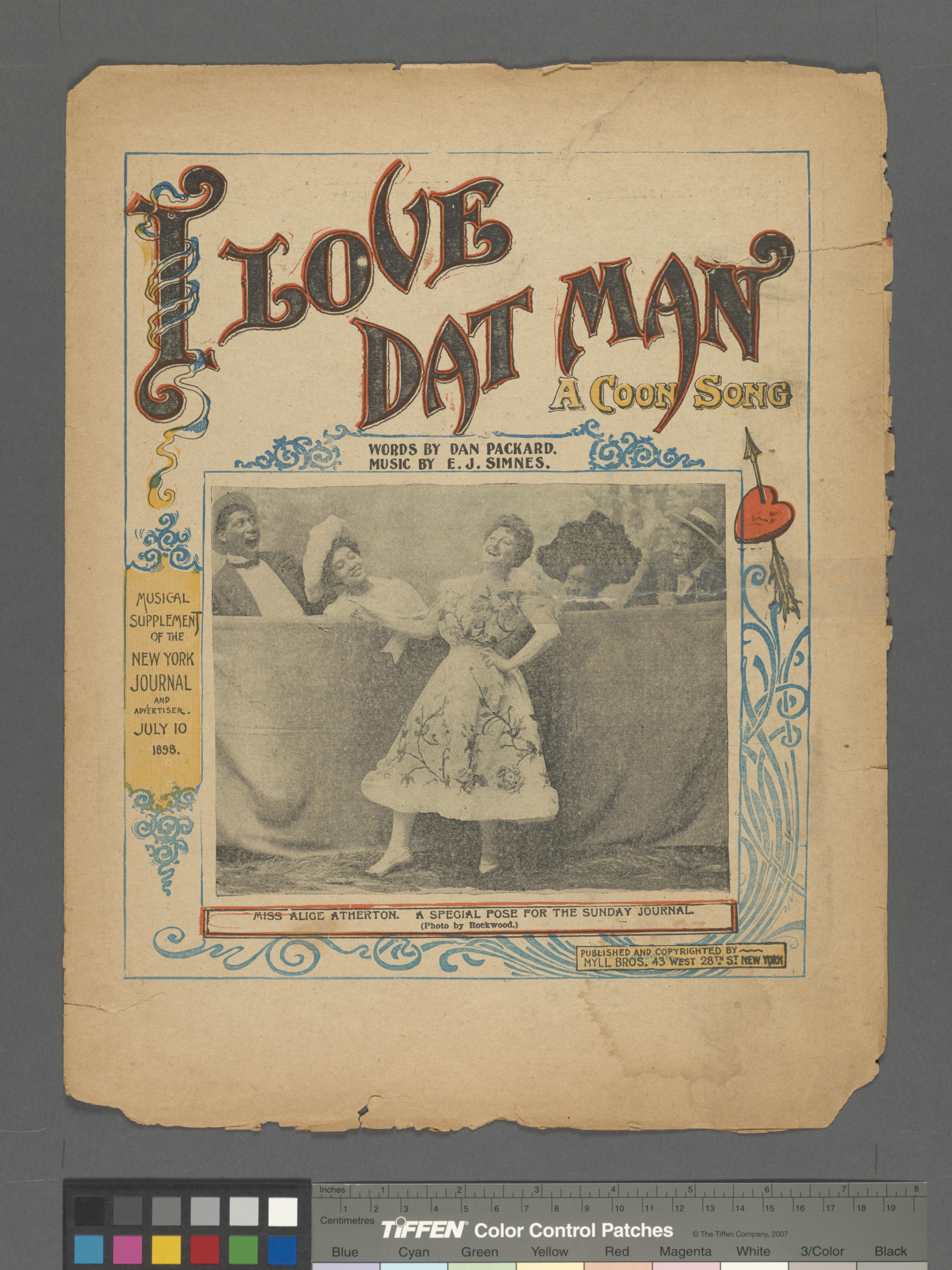
Alice Atherton on stage in 1898

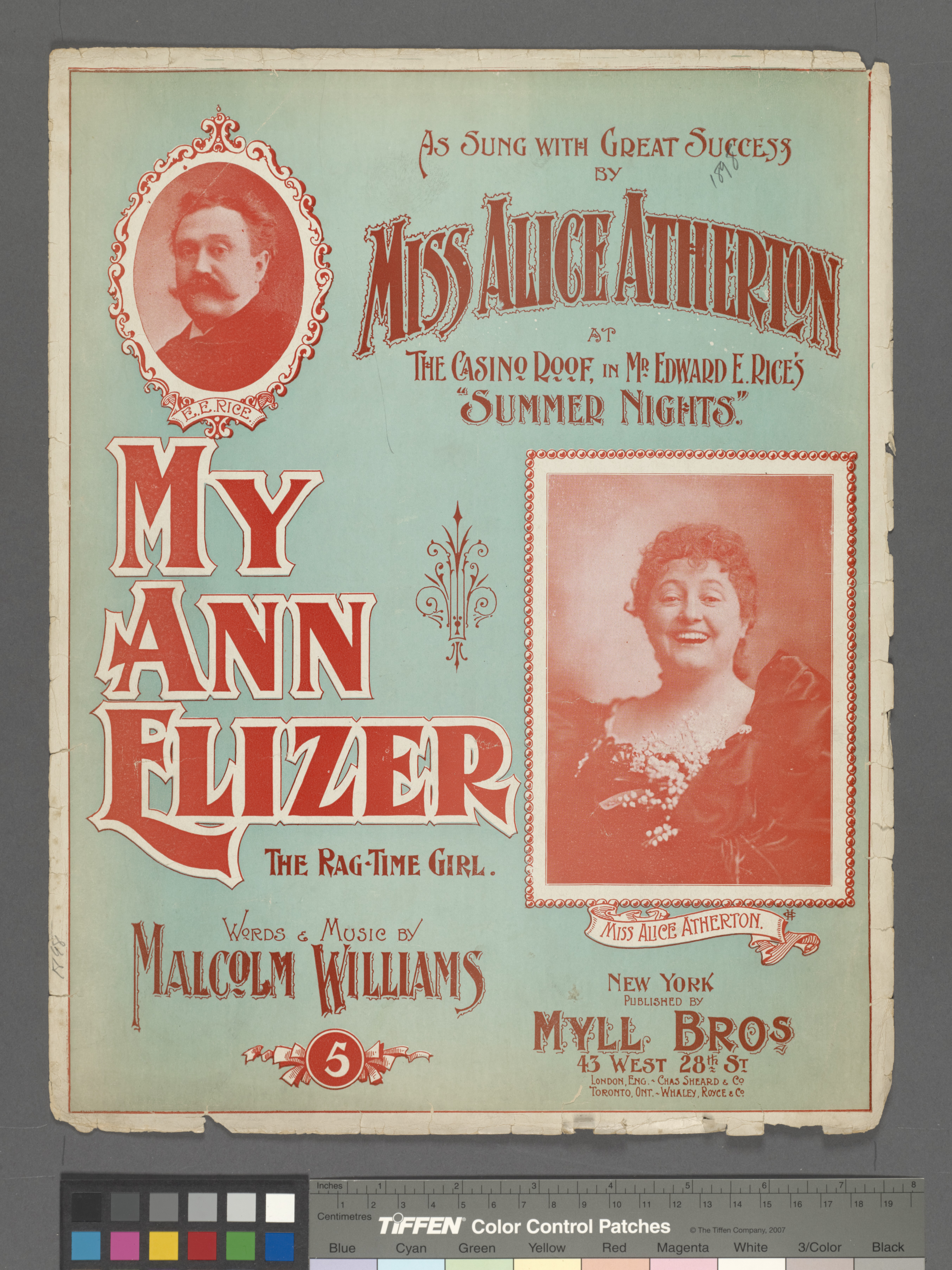
Cover of My Ann Elizer (1898), words and music by Malcolm Williams. New York Public Library Digital Collections

== Reputation and legacy ==
The popularity of Atherton’s performance is also documented by the surviving sheet music. Atherton’s Laughing Song: Sung at Koster & Bial’s (1897), credited to John Crook and George Dance, with an arrangement by Charles E. Pratt, was issued as a musical supplement to the New York Journal and Advertiser. Copies and catalogue records are held by Baylor University Libraries, the University of Georgia Libraries’ Hargrett Sheet Music Collection (Box 1, Folder 65), and the work is digitally documented by the International Music Score Library Project (IMSLP).

The New York Public Library Digital Collections catalogue includes 23 photographs of "Alice Atherton". New York Public Library Digital Collections.

She is featured in the Catalogue of Dramatic Portraits in the Theatre Collection of the Harvard College Library (1930).

Between 1880 and 1892, Atherton featured on tobacco advertising cards issued by Thomas H. Hall Tobacco of New York. The cards promoted stage actors between the acts and the company’s Bravo Cigarettes. She was featured in the Actors and Actresses series (N45, Type 1), issued by Allen & Ginter around 1888 for Virginia Brights Cigarettes.

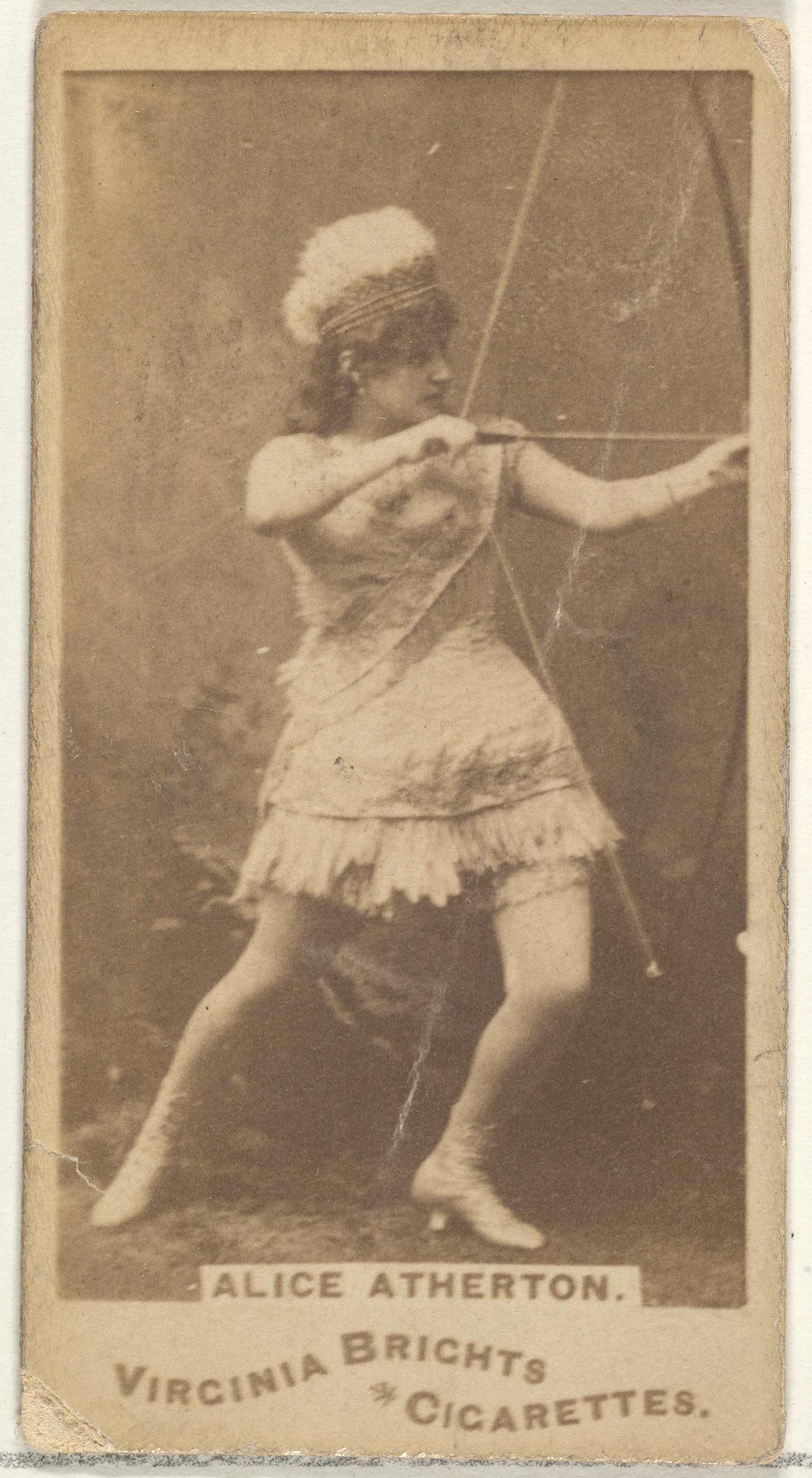
Alice Atherton MET Collection

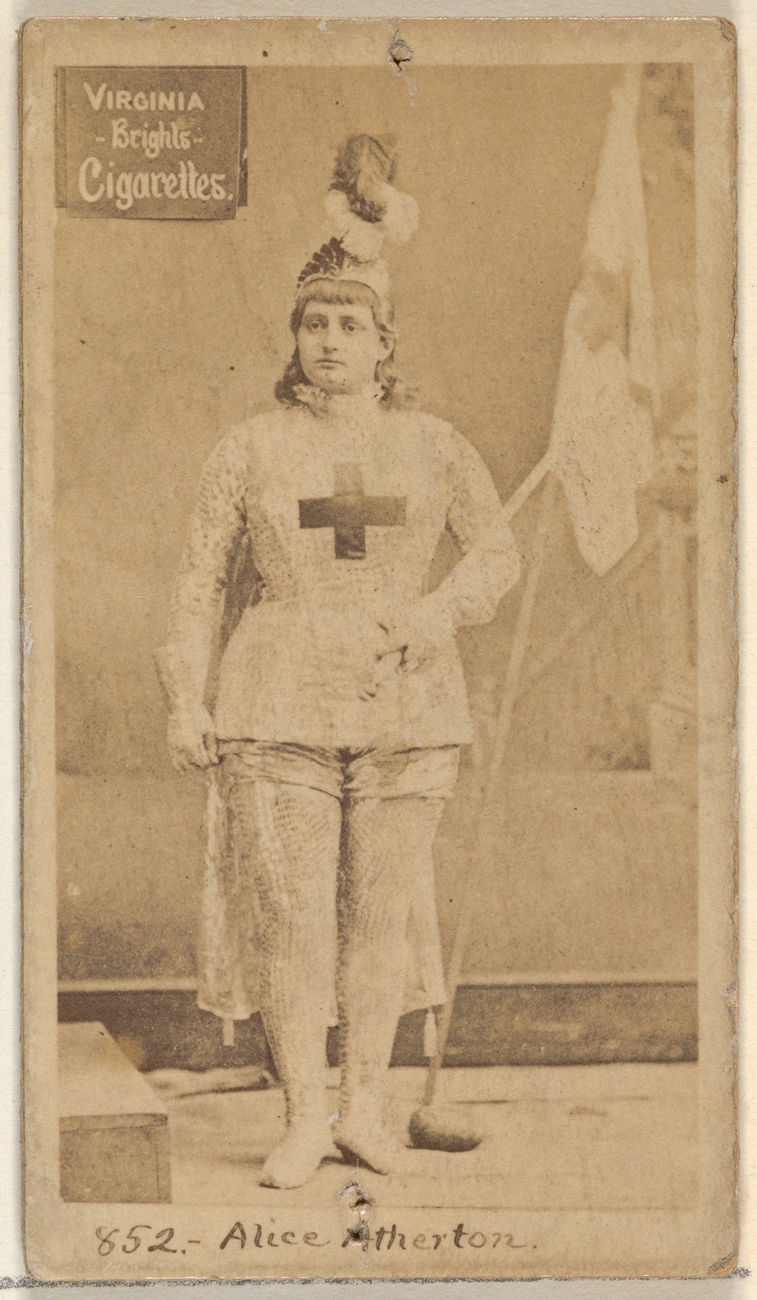
Alice Atherton, from the Actors and Actresses series

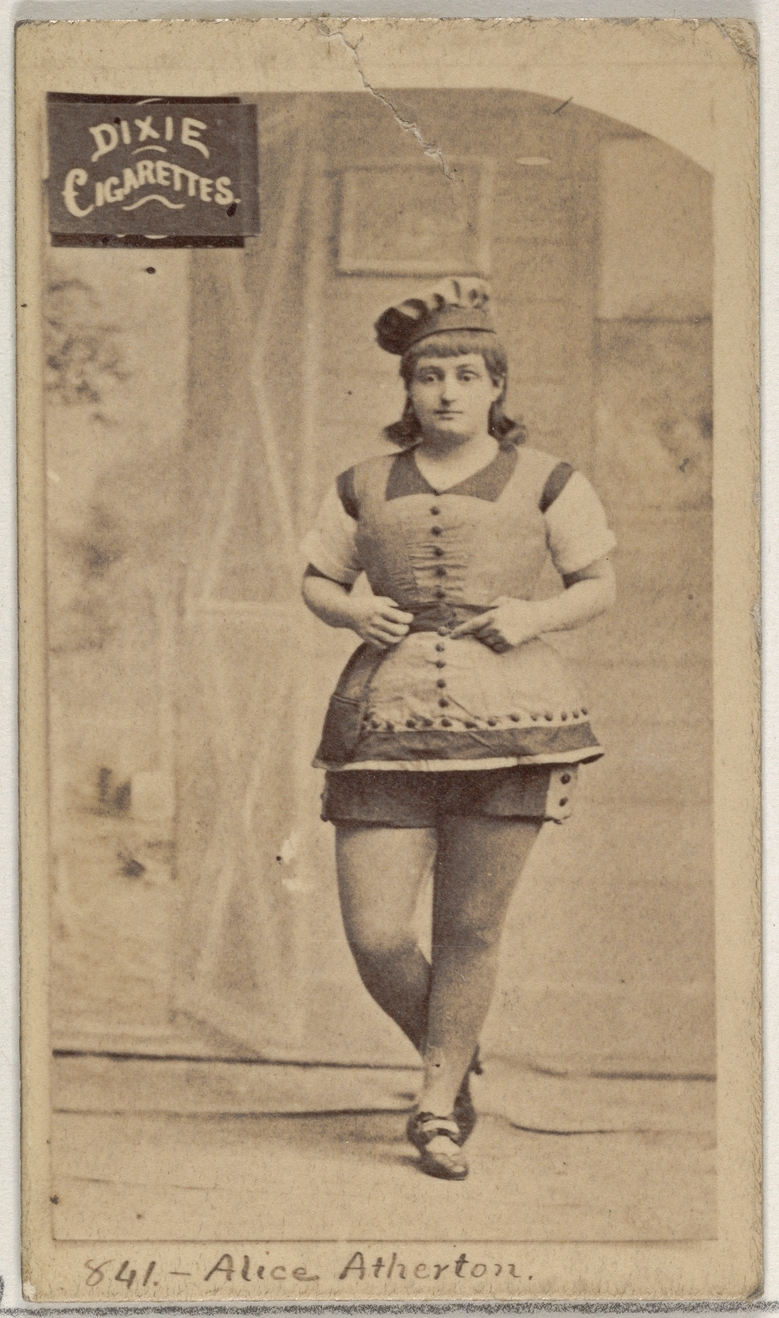
Alice Atherton - MET Collection

Many cards formed part of Frederick Hill Meserve's historical portrait collection, ca. 1850–1915 which were inherited by Dorothy Kunhardt. They have since been acquired by the National Portrait Gallery in Washington D.C.

== Stage roles ==
| Year | Production | Role / details |
|---|---|---|
| Childhood | The Sea of Ice | Child performer, |
| 1865 | Louisville Theatre benefit performance | Benefit performance, March 25, Louisville, Kentucky. |
| 1867 | M. Albusi's Southern Star Combination Troupe | Advertised as Alice Hogan |
| 1868–1869 | Ixion | Lydia Thompson's burlesque company |
| 1869 | Sinbad the Sailor | Lydia Thompson's burlesque company |
| 1870 | Pippin | Twigletto |
| 1870 | Mosquito/La Sonnambula | Performer |
| 1870 | The Forty Thieves | Acrobrand |
| 1870 | Lurline | Performer |
| 1870 | Paris | Orion |
| 1871 | St. George and the Dragon! | Performer |
| 1871 | Les Miserables | Gavroche |
| 187x | Oxygen | Hermance |
| | Queen Ylang-Ylang | Performer |
| 187x | Pijf-Pajf | Queen Folichonne |
| 187x | Mephisto | Camille |
| 1871 | Lucretia Borgia | Performer |
| 1872 | Chow Chow | Performer |
| 1872 | Luna | Performer |
| 1872 | Dick Whittington and His Cat | Performer |
| 1872 | Blue Beard | O'Shaeabac or O'Shacabac |
| 1877-78 | Robinson Crusoe | Robinson |
| 1879 | Babes in the Wood | The Bad Man; second act, D. H. Harkins's benefit, June 6. |
| 1880 | Dreams, or fun in a Photograph Gallery | Ruby |
| 1883 | A dream; or, Binks's Photographic Gallery | Performer |
| 1884 | The Babes, or Whines from the Wood | With Willie Edouin |
| 1885 | The Japs; or, The Doomed Daimio | Performer |
| 1886 | Oliver Grumble | Carrie |
| 1886 | Blackberries | Show girl |
| 1886 | Coming Clown | Tommy |
| 1888 | Katti, the Family Help | Katti |
| 1888 | Airey Annie | Chevalier Marius de Valance |
| 1894 | Jaunty Jane Shore | Jane |
| 1898 | Marquis of Michigan | Etna Vesuvius |
| 1898 | My Ann Elizer | Performer |

== Personal ==
Her two daughters, May and Daisy, also pursued theatrical careers and performed under the Atherton pseudonym. Daisy appeared in Broadway productions, including The Torch-Bearers, and subsequently worked in the first sound films of the 1920s, known as Vitaphone Varieties.

Her sister Lavinia also had a successful career on the stage both sides of the Atlantic, and was known as Venie Atherton, who continued her own career on stage until 1926.

== Death ==
Atherton died on February 4, 1899, at her apartment within the Hotel Audubon in New York City of pneumonia. The New Zealand Mail described her career in theatrical song and dance, her performances at the Avenue, Novelty and Strand Theatres in London, and her success as a music-hall performer. The New York Times announced the location of the Church Service.

Her obituaries were extensive and on February 5, 1899, the Chicago Tribune marked her death, describing her as an actress of merit:

Alice Atherton Dead

Was an actress of merit, best known for her laughing song. Made her first decided hit as the squaw in the burlesque of "Hiawatha" - Was born in St. Louis in 1860 - Married when only 16 years old to Willie Edouin, the English Comedian - Has played all sorts of parts in her twenty years’ career.

New York, Feb 4 - Alice Atherton, the actress, died today from pleuropneumonia in her apartments in the Hotel Audubon, 1416 Broadway. Although Miss Atherton had been ill for three weeks her death was a shock to her friends, as her condition on Friday was so favorable that she expected to leave her bed tomorrow. Early this morning, however, a sudden change for the worse occurred. She sank rapidly and died at 7:30 o’clock. Miss Atherton’s fatal illness began with a cold contracted a month ago in Boston. She was obliged to cancel her Boston and Brooklyn engagements and to cancel entirely her last week’s engagement at Proctor’s Twenty-third Street Theater. On last Sunday night she was removed from the Clarendon Hotel, Brooklyn, to the Hotel Audubon. Alice Atherton, or Alice Hogan, which was her maiden name, was born in St. Louis in 1860 and for the last twenty years had been one of the most popular burlesque actresses here and in England. In 1878 she attracted the notice of Edward E. Rice and made her first decided hit as the squaw in his burlesque, “Hiawatha.” For the succeeding twenty years she was identified with Rice’s enterprises, and, as she often remarked, played “Naughty girls, good girls, rich girls, poor girls, starving mothers, and hungry boys, pages, sailors, soldiers, and saints. ”When she was 16 she married Willie Edouin, the English comedian, and up to within two years ago they shared their successes. Miss Atherton returned here in 1897, after an absence of several years in England, to make another reputation for herself. The tights which had made her so well known were discarded for skirts. Her laughing song is almost famous, and earned for her the sobriquet of “Laughing Alice.” Miss Atherton was a happy combination of good looks and talent, a signer of pleasing method, a dancer of skill and originality, a good mimic, and a perfectly trained player. Her daughter, May Atherton, greatly resembles her, and is already a great favorite on the London burlesque stage. Her sister, Mrs. John A. Mackay, wife of the comedian, better known by her stage name, Venie Bennett, was devoted to Miss Atherton, and is prostrated by her sister’s death. She said she almost feared to cable the news to Miss Atherton’s husband in London. The funeral will take place on Tuesday from the Little Church Around the Corner”.

The London Illustrated News reported on February 11, 1899:

The death from pneumonia of Miss Alice Atherton, who had been appearing with success in the New York Variety Halls is announced. The news will be received with wide regret, especially by that narrowing circle of playgoers who remember this talented lady at her best--in the later years of the Byron-Farnie period. Acting with her husband, Mr. Edouin, in Blue Beard, the Babes, and The Japs she showed remarkable vivacity as an actress, considerable gifts as a mimic, and the faculty of making the most of a song.

The Times of India announced on March 1, 1899:

Playgoers and music-hall visitors will regret to learn that Miss Alice Atherton, the wife of Mr. Bryer, professionally known as Mr. Willie Edouin, died of pneumonia in New York after a very brief illness.

Her body was taken to Evergreen Cemetery pending instructions from her husband who was in England at the time of her death. Her place of burial is unknown.
