= Walter Meserve =

Walter Meserve may refer to:

- Walter Joseph Meserve, American professor, playwright, critic, and author of books on theater
- Walter F. Meserve, mayor of Lynn, Massachusetts
