= Peter Kunhardt =

American documentary filmmaker

Peter W. Kunhardt is an American documentary filmmaker who produces shows for HBO, PBS, and other U.S. television networks. He started Kunhardt Films (previously Kunhardt Productions, Inc.) which produced HBO's "JFK: In His Own Words," HBO's "Bobby: In His Own Words," ABC's "Lincoln", Discovery's "P.T. Barnum" Discovery's "Justice Files" and many more. He works with his two sons Teddy and George in Pleasantville, New York.

== Work ==
Since becoming "Kunhardt Films", Kunhardt has produced Jim: The James Foley Story (HBO), Living With Lincoln (HBO), Nixon By Nixon: In His Own Words for (HBO), Makers: Women Who Make America Seasons 1 & 2 for AOL and PBS, The African Americans: Many Rivers To Cross, the HBO documentary Gloria: In Her Own Words, PBS's 10 part series Finding Your Roots with Henry Louis Gates, Jr Seasons 1 & 2, the HBO documentary "Teddy: In His Own Words", PBS's "African American Lives I & II", and PBS's "Faces of America". In 2009, Kunhardt produced "This Emotional Life" for WGBH which explores aspects of human emotions such as depression and anxiety.

Kunhardt founded Kunhardt Productions with his father, Philip Kunhardt, Jr., and his brother, Philip Kunhardt, III, in 1987. Before founding Kunhardt Productions, Kunhardt worked for 10 years at ABC News. He is the winner of four national television Emmy Awards, one of which was for "JFK: In His Own Words" (1988). He is co-author of the book Lincoln: An Illustrated Biography (1992) and served as producer and director of the ABC mini-series "Lincoln". He has also co-authored "Looking for Lincoln" (2009) which is also a PBS documentary and "Lincoln Life Size" (2009) He co-produced a ten-hour series for PBS, The American President (1999). In 2003 he served as an executive producer for In Memoriam, a one-hour co-production with HBO and Brad Grey Television recounting how Mayor Rudolph Giuliani and his staff coped with the terrorist attacks of September 11, 2001.

== Personal life ==
Kunhardt lives in Chappaqua, New York with his wife, Suzy. He has four children, Peter, Abby, Teddy and George. He is the grandson of children's book author Dorothy Kunhardt, best known for her 1940 creation Pat the Bunny.

Kunhardt attended Groton School and graduated from Middlebury College.

== See also ==
- Assassination of Abraham Lincoln
