= Harriet Vernon =

English actress and singer

Harriet Vernon as Cammpi in The Japs; or, The Doomed Daimio (1885)

Harriet Vernon (9 October 1858–11 July 1923) was an English actress and singer of the Victorian era who appeared regularly in music hall, Victorian burlesque and pantomime in the 1880s and 1890s. In a career that spanned five decades, her final appearances were in 1923. Vernon also toured internationally, appearing in New York, Johannesburg and Berlin.

== Life and career ==
Born in Lambeth in London in 1858 as Harriet Maria Whitehouse, the daughter of George Hickman Whitehouse (1837–1908), a printer, and Caroline (née Newport, 1840–1887), she was one of the leading music hall stars of the 1880s and 1890s, also performing regularly as the principal boy in pantomime at the Theatre Royal, Drury Lane. In 1888 she appeared as Robin Hood in Babes in the Wood at Drury Lane with Sybil Grey, Harry Payne and Dan Leno as the Dame.

Her first professional engagement was as Harriet Vernon in January 1875 at The Star Music Hall in Bermondsey. On 28 February 1875 in Southwark in London, aged 16, she married William Thomas Gillett (1853–1933), an optician. Her children were Edward George Gillett (1876–1953), Ada Mary Ann Gillett (1879–), who followed her mother into burlesque as Ada Vernon, and William Whitehouse Gillett (1881–1933). In 1885 at the Prince's Theatre in Bristol and the Novelty Theatre in London, Vernon played Cammpi in The Japs; or, The Doomed Daimio, a burlesque by Harry Paulton and Mostyn Teddea, alongside Lionel Brough, Willie Edouin and Alice Atherton.

In July 1886, she played Sir Thomas Wyatt in the burlesque Herne the Hunted at Toole's Theatre in London.

Vernon on the lithograph song sheet cover of the patriotic song 'Young King Neptune' (1894)

In 1887, she was divorced from her husband on the grounds of her adultery with the actor and playwright Mark Quinton (born Joseph Mark Keogh, 1860–1891). Her husband gained custody of the children while Keogh and Vernon went on to marry. In 1889, she was declared a bankrupt. In 1890, she appeared for two months at the Concordia in Berlin, Germany. She played the title role in the pantomime Abdallah and the Forty Thieves with Walter Passmore at the Theatre Royal, Birmingham, in 1891, and in 1892 she went on a national tour of the UK. In 1893, 1895 and 1896 she appeared in New York, while in 1896 and 1903 she toured South Africa. On 5 November 1898 Vernon married the actor Albert Marks (1861–) in Marylebone, London but was divorced from him in 1906 following her adultery with the actor Leslie Race. In 1907, she was again declared a bankrupt.

Vernon died in 1923 of bronchial pneumonia at the Doncaster Royal Infirmary having been booked to appear in the touring show '‘Veterans of Variety’' at the Grand Theatre there. She was buried in an unmarked grave at Hyde Park Cemetery. A headstone was finally put on her grave with the support of her descendants in 2012.
