= Kiwi Concert Party =

The Kiwi Concert Party was a group of New Zealand entertainers. They were originally called N.Z. Entertainment Unit, formed in 1941 within the 2nd N.Z. Expeditionary Force. After World War II, the troupe toured New Zealand and Australia.

Terry Vaughan was approached to take over directorship of this touring party and he acquiesced on the condition that he would have full hire-and-fire powers. Vaughan selected musicians from both Concert Party groups to form a big band (reeds, trumpets, trombones and rhythm section – no string section, but two musicians who doubled on violin).

Under the name of the New Zealand Kiwis, the group embarked to Brisbane in early April 1946 after a two-week warm-up season at His Majesty's Theatre in Auckland. The Kiwis toured through Australia and New Zealand until 1954, including playing over two years at the Comedy Theatre in Melbourne. The revues included acts from female impersonators (including John Hunter), singers and comedians.

== Select shows ==
- Alamein (1946)
- Tripoli (1946)
- Benghazi (1946)
- Medley (1948)
- Cassino (1952)
- Now Is the Hour (1953)
