= Rose Edouin =

British actress and playwright (1844–1925)

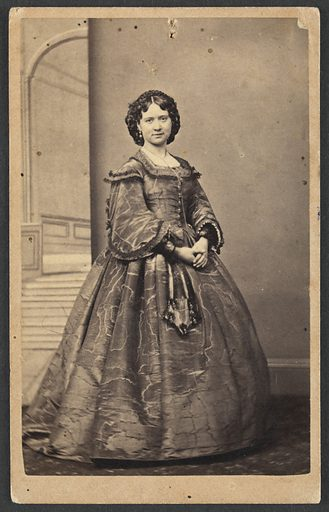
- Born: Rose Edouin Bryer; 29 January 1844; Brighton, England
- Died: 24 August 1925 (aged 81); Harrogate, England
- Occupations: Actress; playwright
- Spouse: George Benjamin William Lewis
- Relatives: Willie Edouin (brother)

Rose Edouin Bryer, also known as Rose Edouin, Mrs G. B. W. Lewis and Rose Edouin Lewis (29 January 1844 – 24 August 1925) was a British actress and playwright who lived for some years in India and Australia. She and her siblings were child performers. She married George Benjamin William Lewis. She returned to acting working, in the UK and South Africa, after they ran short of money in the 1890s. She was one of the first women in Australia to play the title part of Hamlet. After her husband died in Australia she returned to Britain where she continued to act in Shakespeare's plays.

== Early life ==
Edouin was born in 1844 in Brighton. Her parents were John Edwin Bryer and Sarah Elizabeth Bryer (born May). She and her siblings played together in children's shows in London and Brighton. By 1849, the children were appearing as "The Living Marionettes" in London in farces, ballets d'action, and extravaganzas. In 1852 and 1854, the Edouin family children played in pantomimes at the Strand Theatre. In 1857, her parents took the family on a six-year tour of Australia, India, China and Japan. The "Edouin Family" appeared in Melbourne at the Theatre Royal on 14 July 1857 in Frolics in France. Also involved were her sisters Eliza and Julia, and brothers John and Willie. In 1863, Edouin and her brother Willie played in Fawcett's stock company at the Princess's Theatre, Melbourne, in burlesque. She married the impresario George Benjamin William Lewis in 1864.

In the 1880s Edouin ran a drama club for juveniles which culminated in a production of H.M.S. Pinafore. One graduate of this club, Flora Graupner, went on to a stage career. Also in the 1880s, Edouin and her husband were leasing theatres in New Zealand and in Sydney.

== Later years ==
In 1892 she played a season in London at her brother Willie's Strand Theatre, in The Jealous Wife, and in 1894–95 she produced and starred in Grundy and Wills's The Pompadour and Wills's Jane Shore. She shared with Louise Pomeroy the distinction of being one of the few females to play Prince Hamlet in Australia.

In 1897 she became insolvent as a result of the bank failures of the time. In 1900 she returned to the Melbourne stage, playing Mrs Vinard in Trilby for J. C. Williamson's. She went to London where her brother found her work at his theatre and then toured in South Africa before returning to Australia. Her husband's position led to his friends organising a benefit for her.

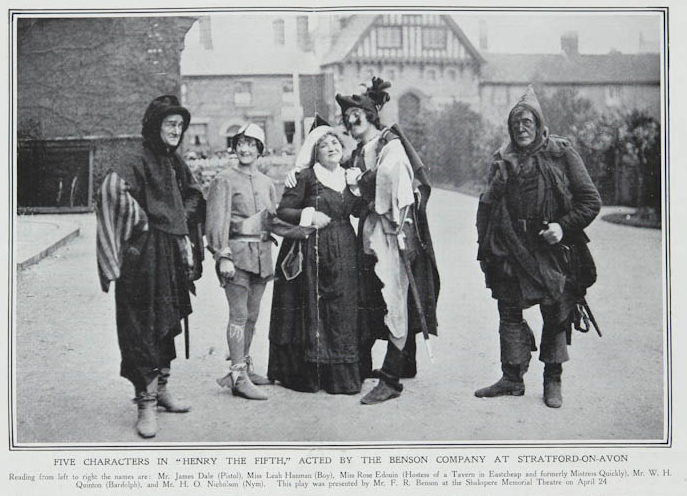
Shakespeare's Tercentenary Henry V, 1916: James Dale, Leah Hanman, Edouin, W. H. Quintin and H. O. Nicholson.

In 1906 she played Lady Wynnegate in The Squaw Man throughout Australia for Williamson's. In her career it was said that she played over 1,000 characters, and in later years was a respected drama teacher.

In 1914 she was acting at Stratford-upon-Avon in several Shakespeare plays, including The Comedy of Errors and The Merry Wives of Windsor. In the following years she was still at the Shakespeare Memorial Theatre appearing in such productions as Romeo and Juliet and Richard III. In 1916 she was in Henry V and acted with Frank Benson's company during the commemorations of Shakespeare's tercentenary at Stratford.

== Death and legacy ==
Edouin died a widow in Harrogate at the age of 81 in 1925 where she was continuing to act.

She had survived her only child who lived to adulthood, George Encyl Lewis (1865–1918). He was an accomplished musician and travelled with G. H. Snazelle to London to assist at his concert at the Egyptian Hall in 1894. He was conductor of the Adelphi Theatre orchestra in 1899 and married his cousin Frances May Grahame (died 1902). Their remains are buried at the Melbourne General Cemetery adjacent to the grave of Elizabeth Edouin Bryer, who died in 1907. He composed the musical comedy A Spree in Paris, for which Edouin wrote the libretto.

== Works ==
She wrote two pantomimes as "Mrs G. B. W. Lewis":

- The Heathen Chinee; or, Harlequin Bluebeard and the Good Fairy of the Plumed Throne of Fairyland, (1876); and
- Little Goody Two Shoes; or, Harlequin Who Killed Cock Robin? with G. B. W. Lewis (1880)

She also wrote, as "Rose Edouin Lewis":

- A play, The Wreck of the Inverness; or, Twenty Years After (1900); and
- A musical (with her son George Encyl Lewis), A Spree in Paris and What Happened aka A Trip to Paris (1908)
