= Edith Kunhardt Davis =

American children's writer (1937–2020)

Edith Kunhardt Davis (September 30, 1937 – January 2, 2020), also known as E. K. Davis, was an American writer. She wrote more than 70 children's books.

== Biography ==
Edith Turner Kunhardt was born September 30, 1937, in Morristown, New Jersey, to Philip B. Kunhardt, a textile executive, and Dorothy Kunhardt, a writer. She attended Miss Porter's School and graduated from Bryn Mawr College in 1959 with a degree in art history.

When Davis was 3 years old in 1940, her mother Dorothy Kunhardt wrote Pat the Bunny dedicated to Davis.

Between 1959 and 1971, she married Edward Shippen Davis.

Davis started her career with Golden Books as an editorial assistant and ended up being a senior editor. She also wrote sequels to Pat the Bunny such as Pat the Cat, Pat the Puppy, and Pat the Christmas Bunny.

In 2020, she died at the age of 82.

== Writings ==
- Pompeii – Buried Alive! (1987)
- Honest Abe (1993)
- I'll Love You Forever, Anyway. (1995)
- My Mother, the Bunny and Me (2016)
- Ned's Number Book
- Martha's House
- Pat the Puppy
- Which Pig Would You Choose?
- Animal Quiz Book
- Giant Sea Creatures
- Grandma and Grandpa Smith
- Pat the Birthday Bunny
- Daddy's Scratchy Face
- Martha's House
- I'm Going to Be a Police Officer
- I'll Love You Forever, Anyway
- Mummies
- Honest Abe
- Summer Vacation
