= Romeo and Juliet (1916 Metro Pictures film) =

1916 silent film by John W. Noble and Francis X. Bushman

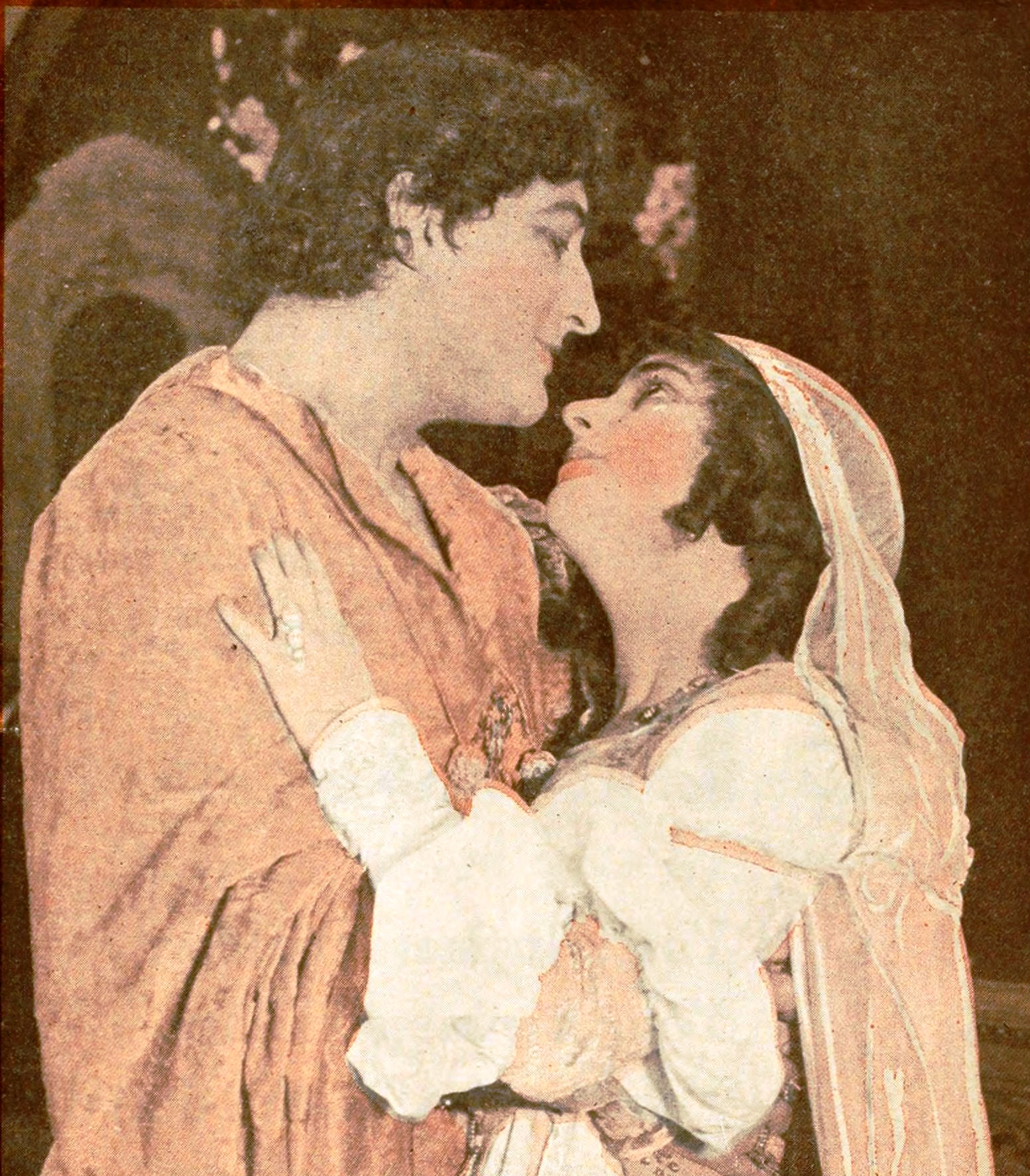
- Francis X. Bushman and Beverly Bayne from an ad for the film
- Directed by: John W. Noble; Francis X. Bushman
- Written by: Scenario: John Arthur; Rudolph De Cordova; John W. Noble
- Based on: Romeo and Juliet; 1597 play by William Shakespeare
- Produced by: Maxwell Karger
- Starring: Francis X. Bushman; Beverly Bayne
- Cinematography: R. J. Bergquist
- Music by: Irene Berg; Samuel Berg
- Production company: Quality Pictures Corporation
- Distributed by: Metro Pictures
- Release date: October 19, 1916
- Running time: 8 reels
- Country: United States
- Language: Silent (English intertitles)

Romeo and Juliet is a lost 1916 American silent film based on William Shakespeare's play, Romeo and Juliet. John W. Noble is credited as director and Francis X. Bushman and Beverly Bayne star as the lovers. This film was produced in 1916, the 300th anniversary of Shakespeare's death, and was released amongst many other commemorations of his works.

A mock "Italian" village was constructed on Brighton Beach in Brooklyn at the cost of $250,000.

This film was produced and released in direct competition with another film, Romeo and Juliet produced by William Fox, starring Theda Bara, and released three days later. Bushman later claimed, in an interview, that he went to see the Theda Bara version and was shocked to see that Fox had added some intertitles from the Metro version.

== Cast ==
- Francis X. Bushman as Romeo
- Beverly Bayne as Juliet
- Horace Vinton as Escalus, Prince of Verona
- John Davidson as Paris
- Eric Hudson as Montague
- Edmund Elton as Capulet
- Leonard Grover as Old Man
- Fritz Leiber Sr. as Mercutio
- Olav Skavlan as Benvolio
- Lawson Butt as Tybalt
- Robert Cummings as Friar Laurence
- A. J. Herbert as Friar John
- Edwin Boring as Balthasar
- William Morris as Abraham
- Joseph Dailey as Peter
- Ethel Mantell as Rosaline
- Venie Atherton as a court lady
- Richard H. Burton as Bishop of Verona
- Marie Booth
- Emma Kemble
- Blanche Davenport
- John B. Hollis
