= Peter W. Kunhardt Jr. =

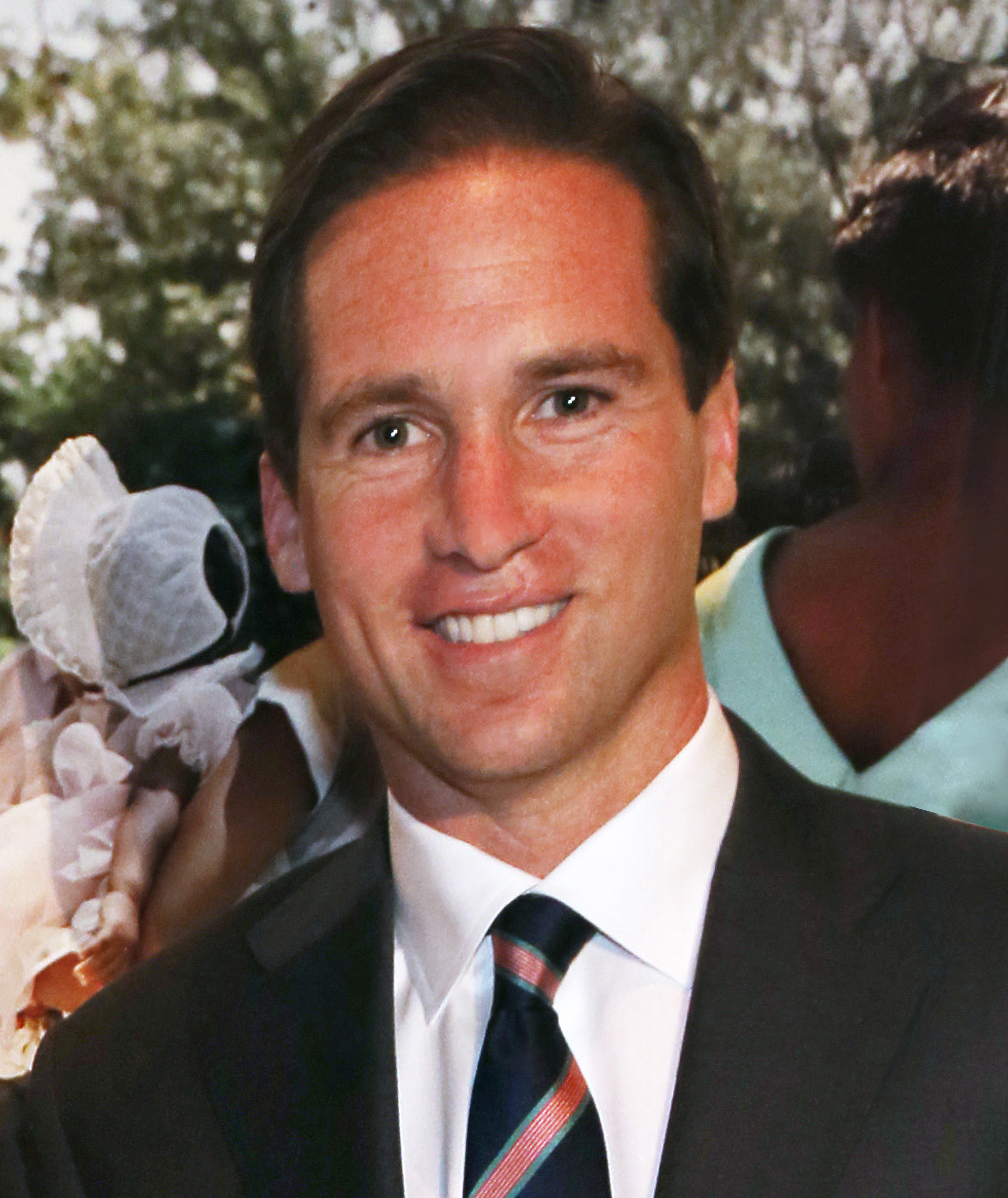
- Occupation: Executive Director of The Gordon Parks Foundation

Peter W. Kunhardt Jr. is an author and the executive director of the Meserve-Kunhardt Foundation and its Gordon Parks Foundation.

== Background and family ==
Kunhardt is the son of documentary film maker Peter Kunhardt, who is a grandson of children's author Dorothy Kunhardt. His late aunt Nancy was married to George Cabot Lodge II of the "Boston Brahmin" family, the Lodges. Dorothy's father Frederick Hill Meserve first began collecting rare photographs of Abraham Lincoln and illustrated the Civil War diary penned by his father William, who had been wounded in the Battle of Antietam.

Kunhardt graduated from Wheaton College in Norton, Massachusetts, where he majored in art history.

== Work ==
Kunhardt oversees the Gordon Parks Foundation's exhibitions, publications, critical research projects, and public programs organized with institutions internationally and its exhibition space in Pleasantville, New York, as well as the artist's archive. As an extension of his role at the Foundation, Kunhardt also serves as series editor for Steidl/Gordon Parks Foundation publications.

Kunhardt has been involved with creating a number of museum exhibitions and catalogues. He has coedited, edited and coauthored books. He is responsible for the Meserve-Kunhardt Foundation's acquisition of the archive of Life photographer Ed Clark and its preservation of the Meserve-Kunhardt Collection of 19th century photography, which now resides at the Beinecke Rare Book & Manuscript Library at Yale University.

Under his leadership, the Gordon Parks Foundation established the Gordon Parks Foundation Scholarships and Prizes program, which has conferred over $1 million in scholarships and prizes to more than 120 students at 10 educational institutions since its inception in 2009. Scholarship partner institutions include: Purchase College, State University of New York; Pratt Institute; New York University Tisch School of the Arts; Ghetto Film School; National YoungArts Foundation; Harlem School of the Arts; Fashion Institute of Technology; Columbia Journalism School. During his tenure, the Foundation also established the Gordon Parks Foundation Fellowship, which has awarded eight fellowships to photographers, artists, filmmakers, and musicians whose work addresses themes of representation and social justice. In 2019, Kunhardt oversaw the launch of The Gordon Parks Arts and Social Justice Fund dedicated to supporting these educational initiatives. He oversaw the creation of the Gordon Parks Foundation / Steidl Book Prize, which serves as a publishing platform for artists whose practice reflects and extends Gordon Parks’ legacy. The recipient of the annual prize develops a book of new work published and distributed by Steidl, one of the leading art book publishers internationally. The inaugural recipient of the prize 2020 was LaToya Ruby Frazier. In 2022, Kunhardt oversaw Howard University's acquisition of 252 photographs by Gordon Parks, one of the most comprehensive collections for the study of Parks' life and work anywhere in the world.

Kunhardt is also an Executive Producer of the 2021 HBO film A Choice of Weapons: Inspired by Gordon Parks, which was an official selection of the 2021 Tribeca Film Festival.

The Meserve/Kunhardt family, including Kunhardt Jr, has been the collector and custodian of photographs and memorabilia of Abraham Lincoln for five generations, the story of which was the subject of the documentary Living With Lincoln that premiered on HBO.

== Museum exhibitions and catalogues in which Kunhardt has been involved ==
- Gordon Parks: A Harlem Family 1967 (2012)
- Gordon Parks: The Making of an Argument (2013)
- Gordon Parks: Segregation Story (2014)
- Gordon Parks: Back to Fort Scott (2015)
- Invisible Man: Gordon Parks and Ralph Ellison in Harlem (2016)
- Gordon Parks: I Am You, Selected Works 1942–1978 (2016)
- Gordon Parks: The Flávio Story (2017)
- Gordon Parks: The New Tide, Early Work 1940-1950 (2018–19)
- Gordon Parks X Muhammad Ali (2019)
- Gordon Parks: The Atmosphere of Crime, 1957 (2020)
- Gordon Parks in Pittsburgh, 1944/46 (2022)
- Gordon Parks: Stokely Carmichael and Black Power (2022)

== Publications ==
- Looking for Lincoln: The Making of an American Icon (2008) – coauthored
- Lincoln, Life-Size (2009) – coauthored
- Gordon Parks: Collected Works (2012) – coedited
- The Photographs of Abraham Lincoln (2015) – edited
- Ed Clark: On Assignment (2020) – coedited
- LaToya Ruby Frazier: Flint is Family In Three Acts (2022), coedited
- Jamel Shabazz: Albums (2022), coedited
- Gordon Parks: Segregation Story Expanded Edition (2022), coedited
- Ralph Ellison: Photographer (2023), coedited and foreword
