= John Hunter (performer) =

John Hunter was a New Zealand performer, best known as a star female impersonator with the Kiwis Revue which performed in New Zealand and Australia in the 1940s and 1950s. In the Kiwis revues, he notably performed two-hander scenes from Noel Coward's Private Lives and Bitter Sweet playing both male and female roles.

He travelled to London in 1950 to study ballet, although rejoined the Kiwis in Australia by 1951. Hunter performed in the mid to late 1950s with the New Zealand Players including as Puck in A Midsummer Night's Dream in 1954. He also played The Jester in the 1959 Australian production of Once Upon a Mattress at the Princess Theatre in Melbourne.
