= Joseph Andrew Rowe =

Joseph Andrew Rowe (1819—November 5, 1887) was an American equestrian and manager of circus companies. In 1849 he brought the first circus entertainment to West Coast of the United States, in San Francisco.

== Biography ==
Rowe, born in North Carolina, joined a circus at age 10 in 1829, and worked as a child performer. He became an independent performer in his circus activities by 1837, and toured the West Indies, Central America, and South America.

Rowe's "Olympic Circus" premiered on 4 October 1849 at his Kearny Street amphitheater in San Francisco, California. It was the first circus to perform on the American West Coast. The city's population growth was in a boom amidst the California Gold Rush. His later shows alternated between circus acts and Shakespeare performances.

Rowe built a more permanent structure in 1850, and still later, he built the "New Olympic Amphitheather."

His "Rowe's American Circus" played in Melbourne, Australia from June 1852 to October 1854, when he liquidated the establishment. The English acrobat George Lewis was one of his performers. Rowe returned to America in February 1854, leaving his wife Eliza, who was a performing member of the circus, riding a trick pony, as sole manager.

Rowe lived at pastoral Rancho Santa Anita (present day Arcadia) in the San Gabriel Valley of Southern California for several years, after purchasing it in 1854.

His Pioneer Circus, assembled in 1856, went into bankruptcy the following year. A second tour in Australia in 1860 was unsuccessful. Rowe held different jobs, starting in 1867, for the next 20 years.

Joseph Andrew Rowe died on 5 November 1887, in San Francisco, California.
