= Pat the Bunny =

1940 children's book by Dorothy Kunhardt

- Original book cover
- Author: Dorothy Kunhardt
- Language: English
- Genre: Children's story
- Publisher: Golden Books
- Publication date: 1940, re-issue May 1, 2001
- Publication place: United States
- Media type: Print paperback
- Pages: 20
- ISBN: 0-307-12000-7
- OCLC: 7375218
- Followed by: Pat the Cat

Pat the Bunny is the first "touch and feel" interactive children's book, written and illustrated by Dorothy Kunhardt. Since its publication in 1940, it has been a perennial best-seller in the United States. Rather than follow a linear narrative, the book invites the reader to engage in tactile activities, such as patting the fake fur of a rabbit, feeling sandpaper that stands for "Daddy's scratchy face", trying on "Mummy's ring", reading a book within a book, playing peekaboo with a cloth, and gazing into a mirror.

It was written and illustrated by author Dorothy Kunhardt. She created Pat the Bunny for her three-year-old daughter Edith, who went on to become a children's writer herself. The New York Times considered it the first interactive book ever written.

Child development experts, such as pediatrician Pierrette Mimi Poinsett, recommend the book due to its "sensory approach".

The proceeds from Pat the Bunny support I Am Your Child, a national public awareness campaign created by the Reiner Foundation to stress the importance of early brain development.

== Reception and legacy ==
As of 2006, Pat the Bunny had sold over six million copies, making it the number-6 all-time bestselling children's hardcover book, according to Publishers Weekly.

Kunhardt's daughter Edith Kunhardt Davis wrote three companions: Pat the Cat in 1984, Pat the Puppy in 1991, and Pat the Pony in 1997.

The publisher, Random House, has developed an entire line of related products.

In 2000, DIC Entertainment discussed creating a TV series based on the book but nothing came of it. In August 2004, Classic Media and Evergreen Concepts partnered to help promote the Pat the Bunny brand. On March 4, 2008, a DVD of the book was released with interactive materials included and an interview with Jean Kunhardt, the author's granddaughter. In 2011, Random House Children's Books released a Pat the Bunny app, inspired by the book for iPad, iPhone, and iPod touch which received critical acclaim.

There have been parodies of the book also, such as Pat the Politician, mocking contemporary political figures, and Pat the Yuppie, which includes activities like touching the sheepskin seatcovers of their new BMW and rubbing the exposed brick of their new condominium's wall.
