= G. B. W. Lewis =

English circus performer and circus and theatre entrepreneur

George Benjamin William Lewis (19 November 1818 – 18 July 1906) commonly referred to as G. B. W. Lewis, or G. B. Lewis, was an English circus performer, later a circus and theatre entrepreneur in Australia. He married in 1864 the actress and playwright Rose Edouin.

== History ==
Lewis was born in Clement's Lane, London, a son of William and Susan Lewis. At age 14 he was engaged as an acrobatic performer in Andrew Ducrow's circus at Astley's Royal Amphitheatre, followed by six years with Pablo Fanque's equestrian troupe, then in 1846 with Hengler's Circus, where he became a leading performer, touring Europe and earning at one event £100 a night (Note: An extraordinary sum, perhaps $10,000 in today's money) for his 15-minute act, and soon became quite wealthy.

Attracted by the gold rush which was then under way in Victoria, Australia, he arrived in Melbourne in 1854 with "Little Tom" his diminutive 14-year-old assistant, and joined Rowe's American Circus, which had been at the corner of Lonsdale and Stephen (now Exhibition) streets, Melbourne since June 1852. Lewis and "Lilliputian Tom" (Note: Lewis and "Little Tom" performed what has been termed "drawing-room entertainment", which has been equated with "Risley" gymnastic feats. Not the same person as Thomas Nunn (died c. 26 June 1863), manager of Rowe's Circus, ringmaster at Astley's Amphitheatre, later licensee of Nunn's Hummums Hotel (named for the Covent Garden establishment), which became in 1870 Young's "Unicorn", at the south-west corner of Bourke and Russell streets.) were with Rowe from February to October 1854, when the circus closed.

== Entrepreneur ==
According to an often-repeated account, Lewis had a personal wealth of £30,000, which he invested in building the huge (110 by 80 by 40 feet (34 m × 24 m × 12 m) high) covered enclosure on Spring Street, naming it Astley's Amphitheatre. Other accounts have him persuading a glib Irish-Californian hotelier and "stump orator", named Tom Mooney, to finance and build it next door to his National Hotel, and take him as its first lessee, with naming rights. Astley's Amphitheatre, named for the London venue, opened 12 September 1854.

Lewis closed Astley's in June 1855 due to lack of patronage. In September he was granted a licence for the Mazeppa Hotel corner Spring and Little Bourke streets, adjacent the amphitheatre, which he advertised to let. He was found insolvent (assets £1172, liabilities £2800) in October and his licence cancelled in November.

Mooney proved insolvent in November 1855. Ownership of Astley's Amphitheatre and the Mazeppa Hotel passed to Samuel Boyle, who leased both to George Coppin; Coppin renamed the amphitheatre "Princess's Theatre" and the Mazeppa "Princess Hotel". Mooney's National Hotel passed to William Hutchinson, and was renamed Excelsior in 1857. Mooney in 1864 founded a savings bank and an insurance company, then decamped for his homeland in October 1870, taking somewhere between £15,000 and £40,000 with him.

Lewis slowly rebuilt his fortune by playing at the Cremorne Gardens, Melbourne and touring his equestrian act through country Victoria. He took a company to the English-speaking enclaves in China and the Far East in 1859. He then decided his future lay in theatre management. In 1863 he engaged a troupe which included Lizzy Naylor, Tilly Earl, and other members of the Edouin family (see below), which toured for several years. He married Rose Edouin in Shanghai, China in 1864. They made further extended tours of the East in 1867 and 1872.

=== Bijou theatre ===
When the foundation stone of the Victorian Academy of Music was laid on 23 May 1876, Lewis had already signed up with the owner, Joseph Aarons, as its first lessee, and on its opening night 6 November 1876 he had Ilma de Murska as guest vocalist, John Hill and Alberto Zelman were guest conductors and Lewis read a poem written by Dr Neild for the occasion. From the outset he called it "a bijou [small and elegant] theatre", and the earliest advertisements were headed both "Academy of Music" and "Bijou Theatre", making a virtue of its smaller size than either the Theatre Royal or Opera House. Concerts and plays were staged on alternate days, the first being Thomas William Robertson's comedy Home, played by Lewis's stock company, headed by Mrs Lewis.

One of Lewis's coups was securing the veteran actor William Creswick, who played at the Academy from August 1877 to 11 December with plays such as Sheridan Knowles' Virginius and William Tell to Shakespearean dramas and the comedy The Jealous Wife to full houses. In preparation for his return, Lewis in July 1878 also took the lease of the Opera House, making considerable improvements. The Creswick season, from 7 September to 23 November, mostly Shakespeare tragedies but also favorites such as A New Way to Pay Old Debts. and Robertson's Ours.

In January 1880 a topical burlesque, The Happy Land, was effectively banned from production by the Government, on threat of cancellation of the Bijou's licence. Creswick returned that year, reduced in voice, but still attracting good houses. The name "Academy of Music" was dropped that same year. and J. A. Wilson, owner of the Academy of Music Hotel, purchased the leasehold theatre from Aarons in 1884. Lewis chose not to renew the lease when it expired on 1 March 1885. In that year he was elected president of the Australasian Dramatic and Musical Association.

He died at the Alfred Hospital following surgery.

== Mrs G. B. W. Lewis ==
Lewis married the successful actress Rose Edouin Bryer a.k.a. Rose Edouin in 1864 who had come to Australia to appear with her family.

=== Edouin family ===
John Edwin/Edouin Bryer (1810– ) married widow Sarah Elizabeth Lind née May in 1832.

- Charles Edouin Bryer (c. 1833–1869) married Louisa Elizabeth "Lizzie" Naylor (1845 – 11 July 1907) on 22 April 1863
  - Lillie May Bryer (died May 1940) married Herbert Jackson Piersol (born 1866) on 25 November 1895
  - George John Bryer (1865– ) theatre manager, married Mary Ann Maria Lennard in 1891
  - William Edouin Bryer, business manager for the Brough-Flemming company.
- John William Bryer "John Edouin" (c. December 1840 – 17 October 1875 in Mumbai) married Martha Matilda "Tilly" Earl (died 11 February 1888). She married again to Charles H. Newton (died 1888)
- Eliza Sarah Bryer (c. July 1842 – 1857)
- Rose Edouin Bryer "Rose Edouin" (29 January 1844 – 24 August 1925) married G. B. W. Lewis in 1864, subject of this article
  - G(eorge) Encyl Lewis (c. 1865 – 1 December 1918) married cousin Frances May Grahame (below)
- William Frederick Bryer "Willie Edouin" (1 January 1846 – 1908) married Alice Atherton (1854–1899) c. 1873.
  - Daisy Bryer (c. 1875– )
  - May Bryer (c. 1876– )
- Julia Lucy Bryer ( – 3 March 1891 in Philadelphia) married William Forbes Grahame in India in 1873
  - daughter (c. 1875– )
  - Frances May Grahame (died 7 March 1902), perhaps the same person as directly above, married cousin, musician George Encyl Lewis (see above)

== Personal ==
Lewis built "Shanghai Villa" on St Kilda Road, opposite Fawkner Park. He sold its entire "very superior, well kept" furniture, also horses, carriages, dogs etc., by auction in 1867 preparatory to leaving for Europe. Some valuable pieces were donated or loaned to the Art Gallery. The residence was let by Lewis for £260 p.a. He had another sale of furniture and art objects in June 1872 when about to leave for India. The property was sold in 1882 when they left for Europe.

== Family ==
George Encyl Lewis (c. 1865 – 1 December 1918) was the only child of Mr and Mrs Lewis to survive childhood. He was an accomplished musician, and travelled with G. H. Snazelle to London to assist at his concert at the Egyptian Hall in 1894. He was conductor of the Adelphi Theatre, orchestra in 1899. (Note: He married his cousin Frances May Grahame (died 7 March 1902). Their remains are buried at the Melbourne General Cemetery adjacent the grave of Elizabeth Edouin Bryer, who died 11 July 1907.) He conducted the orchestra which accompanied the first production of Wilson Barrett's The Never Never Land in 1902. He composed a musical comedy A Spree in Paris, for which his mother wrote the libretto.
