= Willie Edouin =

British comedian, actor and singer

Willie Edouin (1 January 1846 – 14 April 1908), born William Frederick Bryer, was an English comedian, actor, dancer, singer, writer, director and theatre manager.

After performing as a child in England, Australia and elsewhere, Edouin moved to America, where he joined Lydia Thompson's burlesque troupe, performing with this company both in the US and Britain. He returned to America in 1877, where, by 1880, he managed his own company. For over a decade, starting in 1884, Edouin managed theatres in London, particularly the Strand Theatre, producing and starring in comedies, farces and burlesques. From the 1890s, he appeared as the comic lead in several hit Edwardian musical comedies, including Florodora.

== Early years ==
Edouin was born in Brighton under the name William Frederick Bryer, the youngest of five children of John Edwin Bryer, an English dance instructor, and his wife Sarah Elizabeth (née May). He and his siblings played together in children's shows in London and Brighton. By 1849, the children were appearing as "The Living Marionettes" in London in farces, ballets d'action, and extravaganzas. In 1852 and 1854, the Edouin family children played in pantomimes at the Strand Theatre. In 1857, Edouin's parents took the family on a six-year tour of Australia, India, China and Japan. In 1863, Edouin and his sister Rose Edouin played in Fawcett's stock company at the Princess's Theatre, Melbourne, in burlesque.

Edouin moved to the United States in 1869, where he first appeared with Lawrence Barrett and John McCullough at the California Theatre in San Francisco. He soon became popular for his burlesques of popular plays and local celebrities. He made his New York debut in 1870 in The Dancing Barber as Narcissus Fitzfrizzle. Edouin next played the role of Murphy in Handy Andy with the Bryant's Minstrels. In 1871, he joined Lydia Thompson's burlesque company, as its leading male comedian, and met his future wife, Alice Atherton, who was also appearing with the troupe. Edouin played with Thompson for six seasons in burlesques, many of them by H. B. Farnie, of Bluebeard, The Princess of Trébizonde! St. George and the Dragon! The Forty Thieves, Lurline, Robin Hood, Mephisto and the Fourscore, and others. He earned particular praise in Robinson Crusoe, for his acrobatics and clowning as Friday, and in Bluebeard, for his portrayal of Chinaman Washee-Washee. He returned to England with Thompson in 1874 and repeated the latter role in London that year. Edouin continued to perform with the troupe both in London and on tour in Britain for three seasons.

In 1877, Edouin returned with Thompson to New York. He soon appeared with Colville's Folly Company, an American farce-comedy troupe, and then with Edward E. Rice's Surprise Party in pantomimes such as Babes in the Woods, a version of The Lost Children and Horrors. In 1880 he formed his own company, Willie Edouin's Sparks, co-authoring and starring in a successful farce, Dreams. In 1881, Edouin purchased a photo gallery in Philadelphia but sold it the following year.

== Later years ==
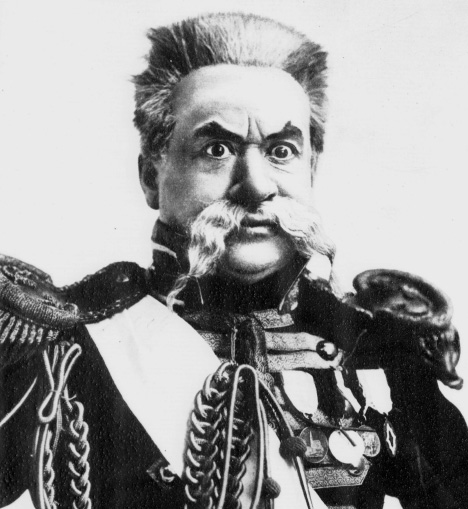
Edouin as General des Ifs in The Little Michus

Edouin returned to England in 1884, partnering with Lionel Brough, to produce the successful burlesque The Babes, or, Whines from the Wood, by Harry Paulton. The play was performed at Toole's Theatre and starred Edouin and his wife. In August 1886, Edouin played Carraway Bones with much success in the farce Turned Up by Mark Melford. From 1888 he mostly starred under his own management at the Strand Theatre in London. He appeared in a revival of H. J. Byron's Victorian burlesque Aladdin, or the Wonderful Scamp, in 1888 as Widow Twankay, There he produced Katti, the Family Help, starring himself and his wife. In 1889, however, he managed Our Flat at the Opera Comique, in which he was popular as Nathaniel Glover. The play ran for nearly 600 nights. At the Strand in the early 1890s, he continued to manage and appear in comedies. In 1894, he had another success as Jeremiah Grubb in The Jerry Builder, by Melford, in which his daughter May débuted.

Edouin appeared in a number of very successful Edwardian musical comedies in London, including New Market at the Opera Comique under his own management, La poupée (1897), The Royal Star (1898), A Bunch of Keys, Fun in a Photograph Gallery and Dreams. He had his greatest success in the international hit Florodora (1899 in London and 1900 in New York), after which he appeared in The Silver Slipper (1901), before taking his own company to tour South Africa. He returned to London, appearing in more musicals, such as The Girl from Kays (1902), Sergeant Brue, The Little Michus (1905), The Blue Moon and The Little Cherub.

In 1906, Edouin toured in Britain and then returned to the United States in 1907, playing in vaudeville. By this time, however, he was losing his mental acuteness and decided to return to London. Although a very successful comedian, Edouin did not fare well as a manager and left a small estate. During his career, Edouin portrayed as many as five hundred characters.

Edouin died in 1908, aged 62, and is buried in Kensal Green Cemetery in London.

== Family ==
Edouin married Alice Atherton; they had two daughters, Daisy and May, who each became actresses.
