= Jeremiah Gurney =

American daguerreotype photographer

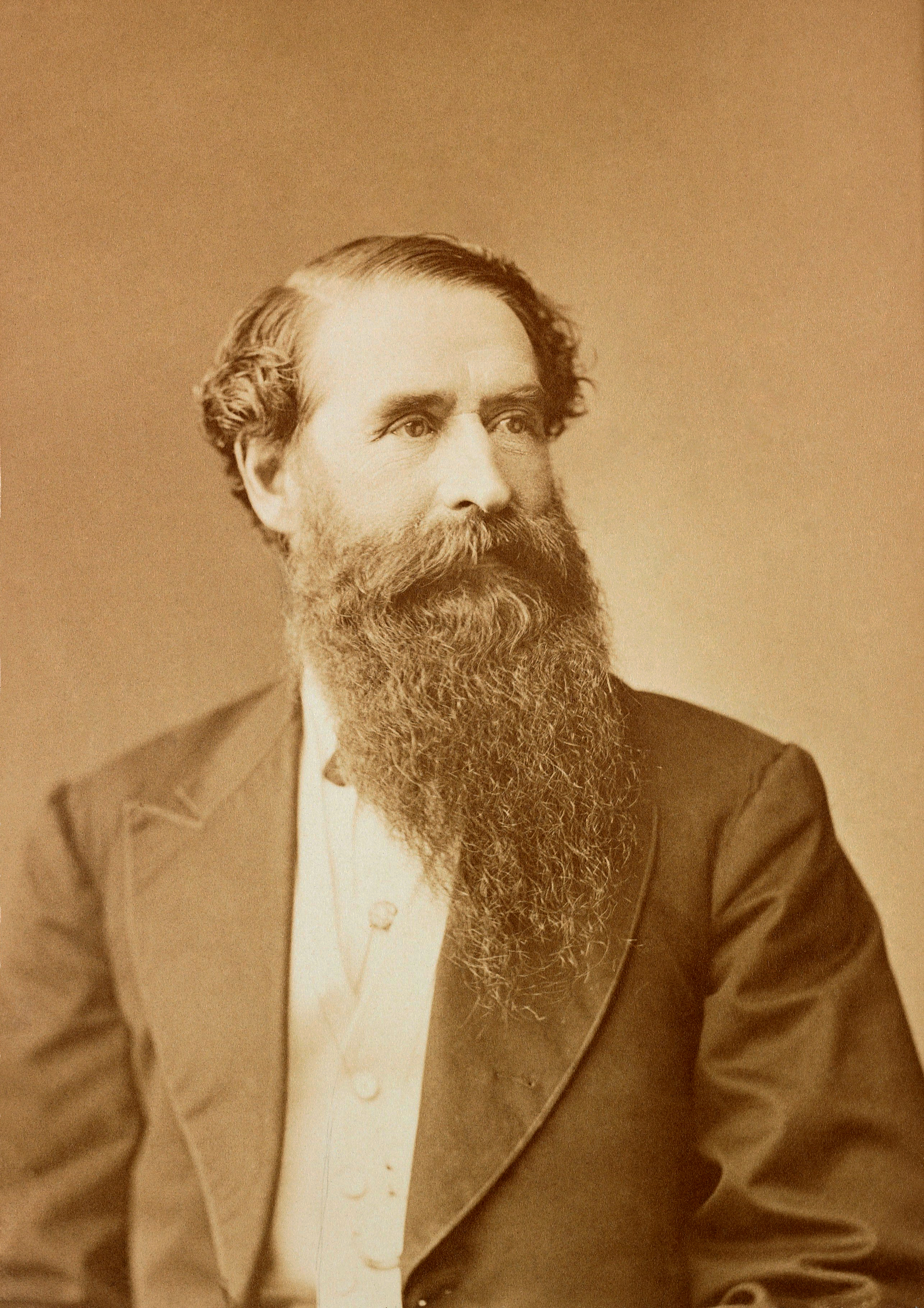
Self-portrait, c. 1869

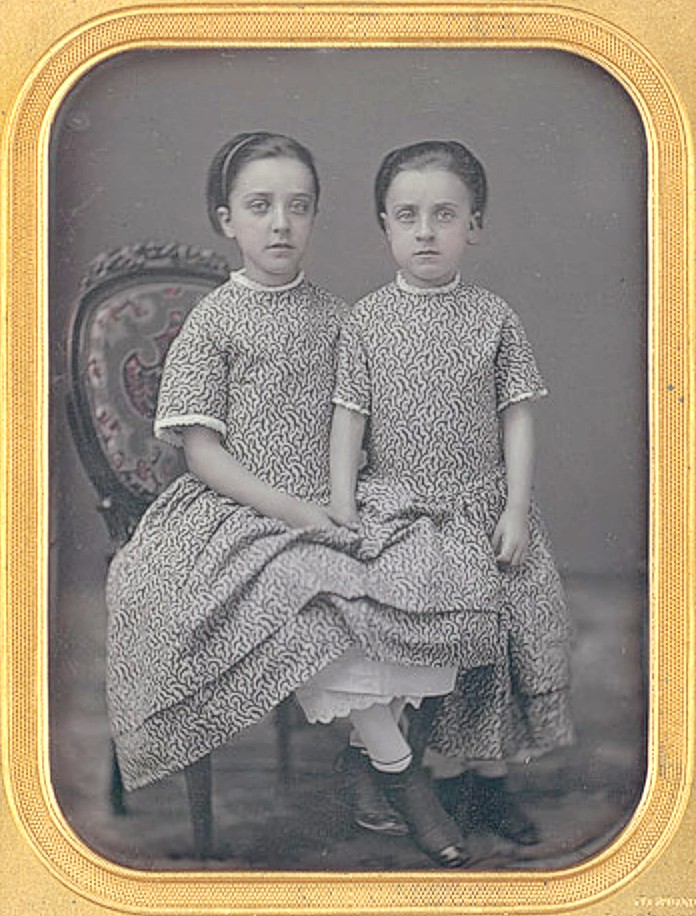
Two Girls in Identical Dresses, c. 1857, located at The Metropolitan Museum of Art, NYC

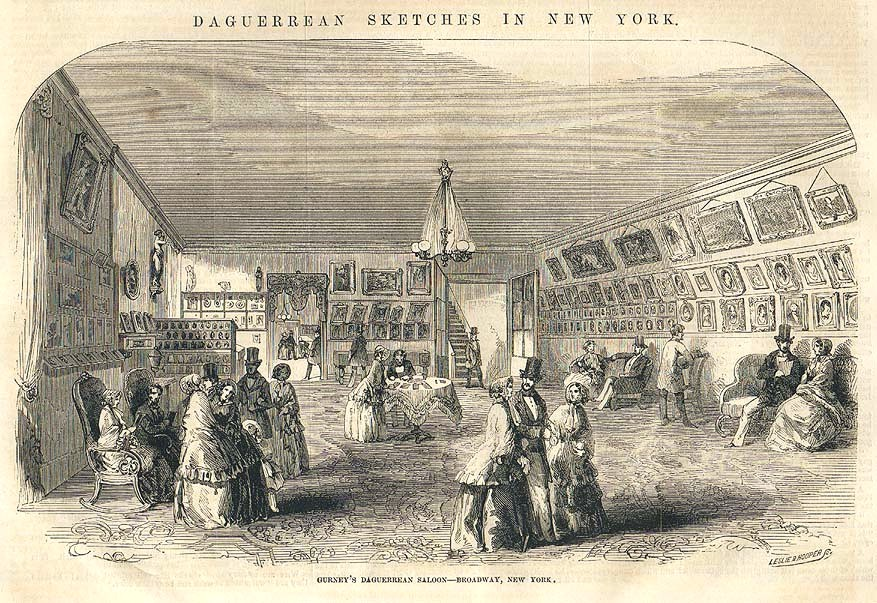
Gurney's Daguerrean Saloon inside 349 Broadway, c. 1853

Jeremiah Gurney (October 17, 1812 – April 21, 1895) was a highly sought-after American daguerreotype photographer operating in New York, most famous for having taken the only known authenticated photograph of Abraham Lincoln's funeral..

== Biography ==
Gurney worked in the jewelry trade in Saratoga, New York, but learned about the daguerreotype from Samuel Morse, took up photography, and after moving to New York City, began selling photographs alongside jewelry from his shop. Different sources call him either the owner of the first photographic gallery in America and second practitioner after Morse, or merely one of the earliest practitioners in New York City and "one of the first" photographic galleries on Broadway.

The Metropolitan Museum of Art credits his success to him "producing the finest daguerreotypes in Gotham", and praises his "tonally delicate, startlingly three-dimensional portraits" such as his "Two Girls in Identical Dresses". A Scientific American article, reviewing an 1853 photographic display at the Crystal Palace in New York praises American photographers and calls out the "exquisite taste and skill displayed in the pictures of Gurney and others" at the exposition.

Photographer of the American Civil War Mathew B. Brady was a journeyman in the firm that made the cases for Gurney's shop, and was inspired to enter photography by Gurney's success, starting up a rival firm.

Gurney's renown as a high quality photographer resulted in him being commissioned to photograph Abraham Lincoln's casket at his funeral.

== Gallery ==
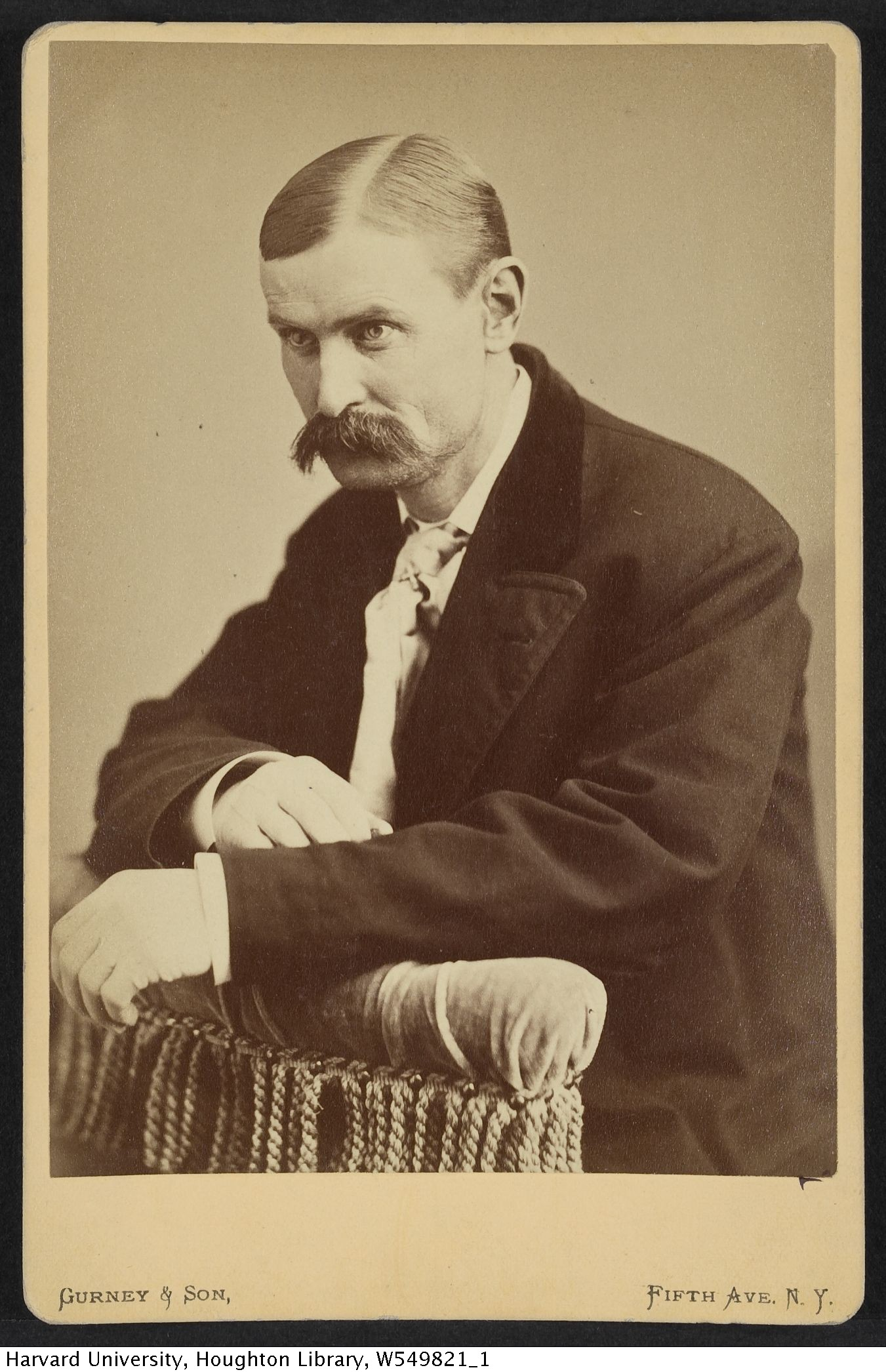
Actor Nelse Seymour

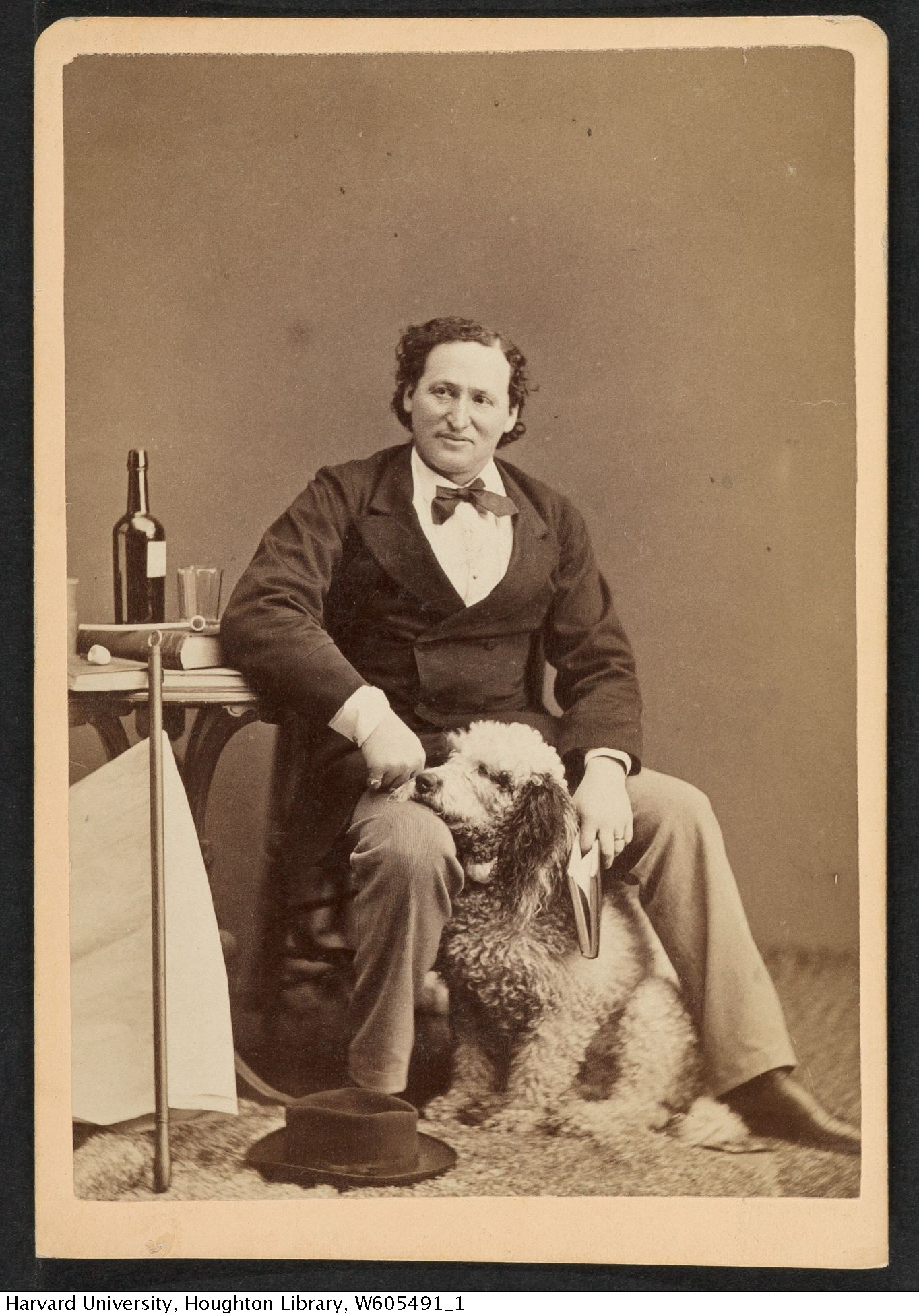
Actor Daniel E. Bandmann

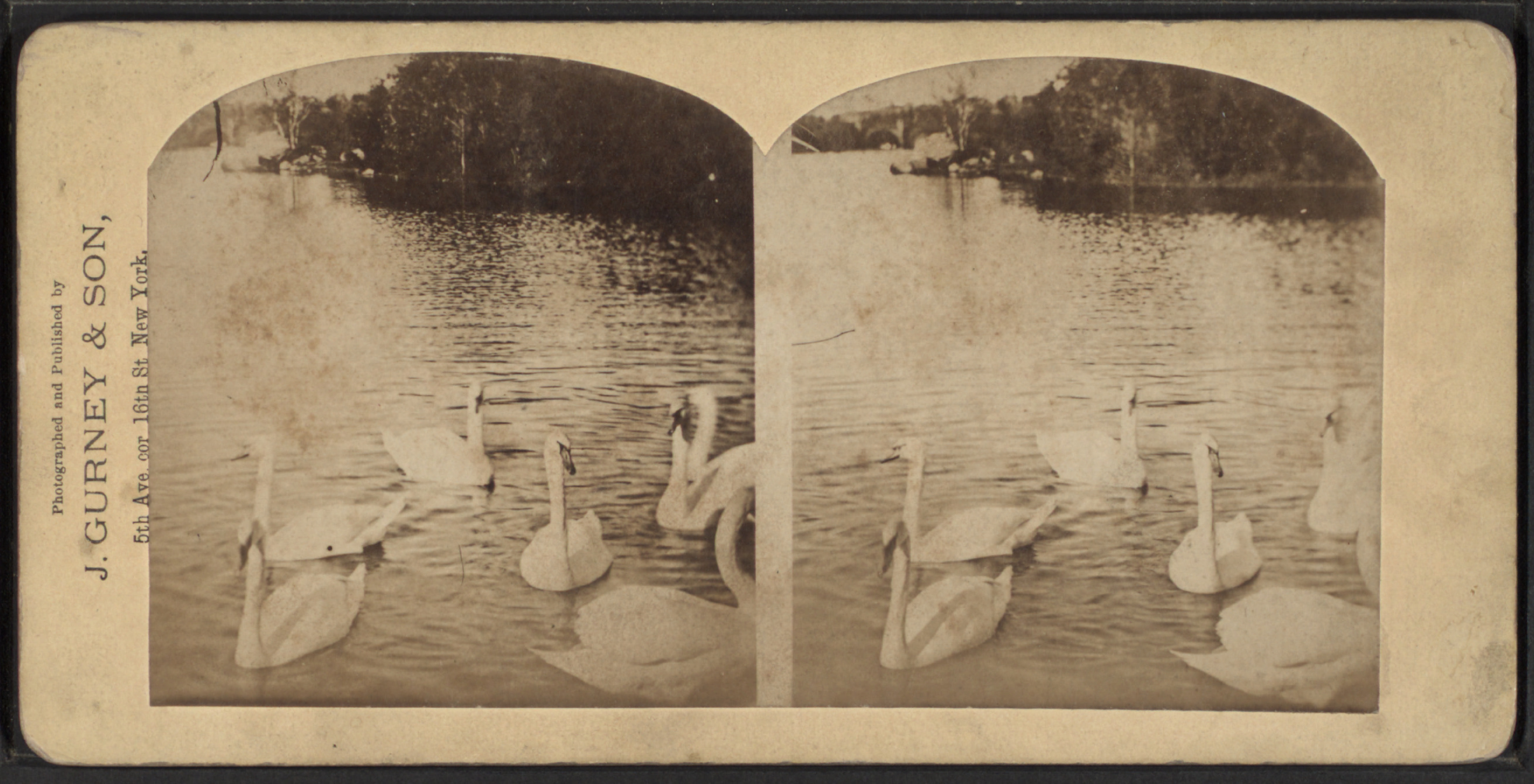
Swans in Central Park, New York

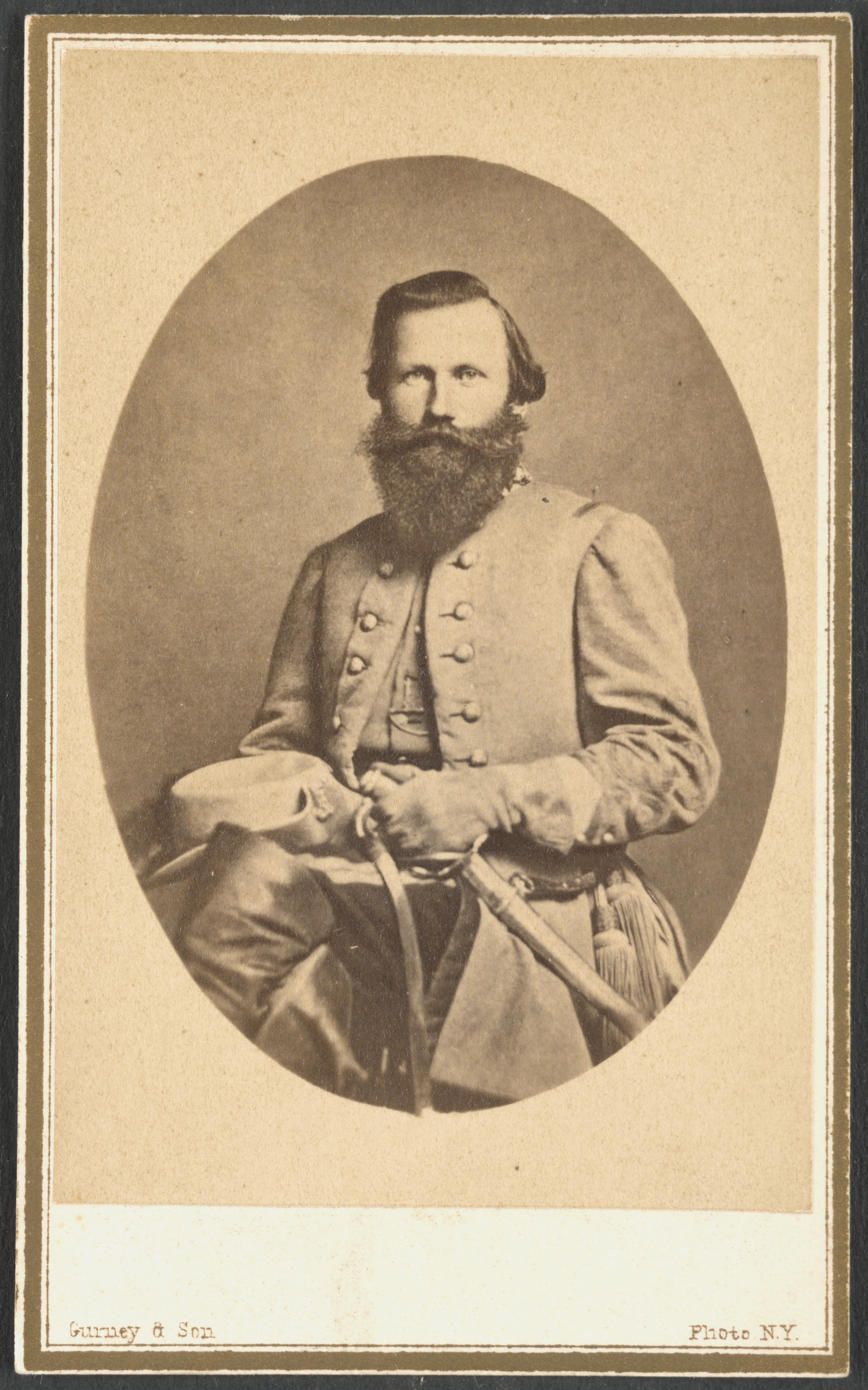
CSA General J. E. B. Stuart

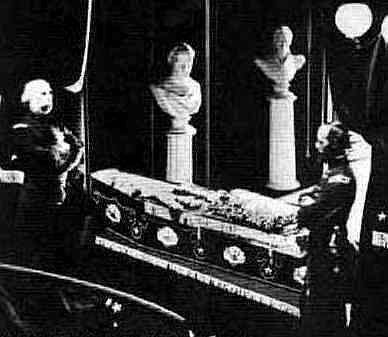
Abraham Lincoln's open casket

== Bibliography ==
- Peterson, Christian A. Chaining the Sun: Portraits by Jeremiah Gurney, ISBN 978-0-8166-3656-3, University of Minnesota Press (1999)
