= Walter Joseph Meserve =

American author (1923–2023)

Walter Joseph Meserve (March 10, 1923 – November 5, 2023) was an American academic, playwright, critic, and author of books on theater. He is a Fellow of the National Endowment for the Humanities.

Meserve's An Outline History of American Drama has been called "a highly valuable "vest pocket" history of the American drama which should be on the shelf of every teacher of contemporary theater, every critic, and every student with an interest in modern drama". The American Historical Review said his book about American drama during the Andrew Jackson era "brings much of Quinn's carefulness and Odell's enthusiasm to embroidering their work", but added that "Meserve's gestures to the new are disappointingly fainthearted".

Meserve died in Brooklin, Maine on November 5, 2023, at the age of 100.

== Bibliography ==
- Fateful Lightning America's Civil War Plays, June 18, 2000 with Mollie Ann Meserve
- When Conscience Trod the Stage: American Plays of Social Awareness, April 1, 1998 with Mollie Ann Meserve
- On Stage America: A Selection of Distinctly American Plays, August 1, 1996
- An Outline History of American Drama, 1965, 1994
- The Musical Theatre Cookbook: Recipes from Best-Loved Musicals, January 1, 1994 with Mollie Ann Meserve
- A Chronological Outline of World Theatre, Apr 1, 1992 with Mollie Ann Meserve
- Heralds of Promise: The Drama of the American People During the Age of Jackson, 1829-1849 (Contributions in American Studies) 1986
- American drama to 1900: A guide to information sources, 1980
- An emerging entertainment: The drama of the American people to 1828, 1977
- Modern Drama From Communist China, 1975
