= Frederick Hill Meserve =

Businessman and photography collector

Frederick Hill Meserve (1865 – 1962) was a businessman and collector of photographs. He published a large collection of early American photographic portraits. In 1944 he worked with historian Carl Sandburg to publish 100 photographs of Abraham Lincoln, titled "The Photographs of Abraham Lincoln". The Library of Congress has his photographic publishings in its collection. Yale University’s Beinecke Rare Book and Manuscript Library and the National Portrait Gallery together own more than 73,000 items in the Meserve-Kunhardt Collection.

He was born in Boston on November 1, 1865. He graduated from the Massachusetts Institute of Technology. His father William Neal Meserve was a veteran of the American Civil War and kept a diary. Dorothy Turner (née Meserve) Kunhardt was his daughter.
