= Dorothy Kunhardt =

American writer

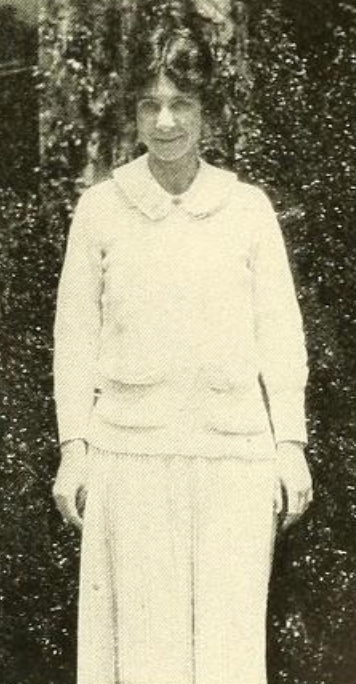
- Dorothy Meserve, from the 1923 Bryn Mawr yearbook
- Born: Dorothy Meserve; September 29, 1901; New York City
- Died: December 23, 1979 (aged 78)
- Notable work: Pat the Bunny
- Spouse: Philip B. Kunhardt
- Children: 4
- Relatives: George Cabot Lodge II (son-in-law); Peter Kunhardt (grandson); Peter W. Kunhardt Jr. (great-grandson)

Dorothy Kunhardt (née Meserve; September 29, 1901 – December 23, 1979) was an American children's-book author, best known for the baby book Pat the Bunny. She was also a historian and writer about the life of U.S. President Abraham Lincoln.

== Works ==
Kunhardt wrote nearly 50 books, including one of the bestselling children's books in history, Pat the Bunny, which has sold over six million copies. She initially wrote it for her youngest child, Edith Kunhardt Davis. Other works include Twenty Days, an account of Lincoln's assassination and the twenty days that followed, which she wrote with her son, Philip B. Kunhardt, Jr.; Tiny Animal Stories; The Telephone Book; Lucky Mrs. Ticklefeather; Brave Mr. Buckingham; Junket is Nice (1933); Wise Old Aard-Vark (1936); and Now Open the Box.

== Personal life ==
A daughter of historian Frederick Hill Meserve, she was born in New York City and graduated from Bryn Mawr College in 1923. She married Philip B. Kunhardt Sr. (son of George E. Kunhardt), a New Yorker and a Harvard Crimson football letterwinner. Their home in Morristown, New Jersey housed a collection of items related to the American Civil War and Abraham Lincoln.

They had four children:

- Nancy Kunhardt Lodge (1927–1997), who was married to Harvard Business School professor emeritus George Cabot Lodge II
- Philip Bradish Kunhardt Jr. (1928–2006), former reporter and managing director of Life magazine and producer of documentaries such as PBS's The American President; married to the former Katharine Trowbridge and had 6 children, including documentary filmmaker Peter Kunhardt, whose son is Peter W. Kunhardt, Jr.
- Kenneth Bradish Kunhardt (1930–1995), stockbroker; married to the former Edith L. Woodruff of New York City, former schoolteacher, they had 4 children. Edith Woodruff was related to the Coolidge family of Boston through her mother.
- Edith Kunhardt Davis (1937–2020), children's author and illustrator
