= Joy Bells =

1919 musical revue devised by Albert de Courville

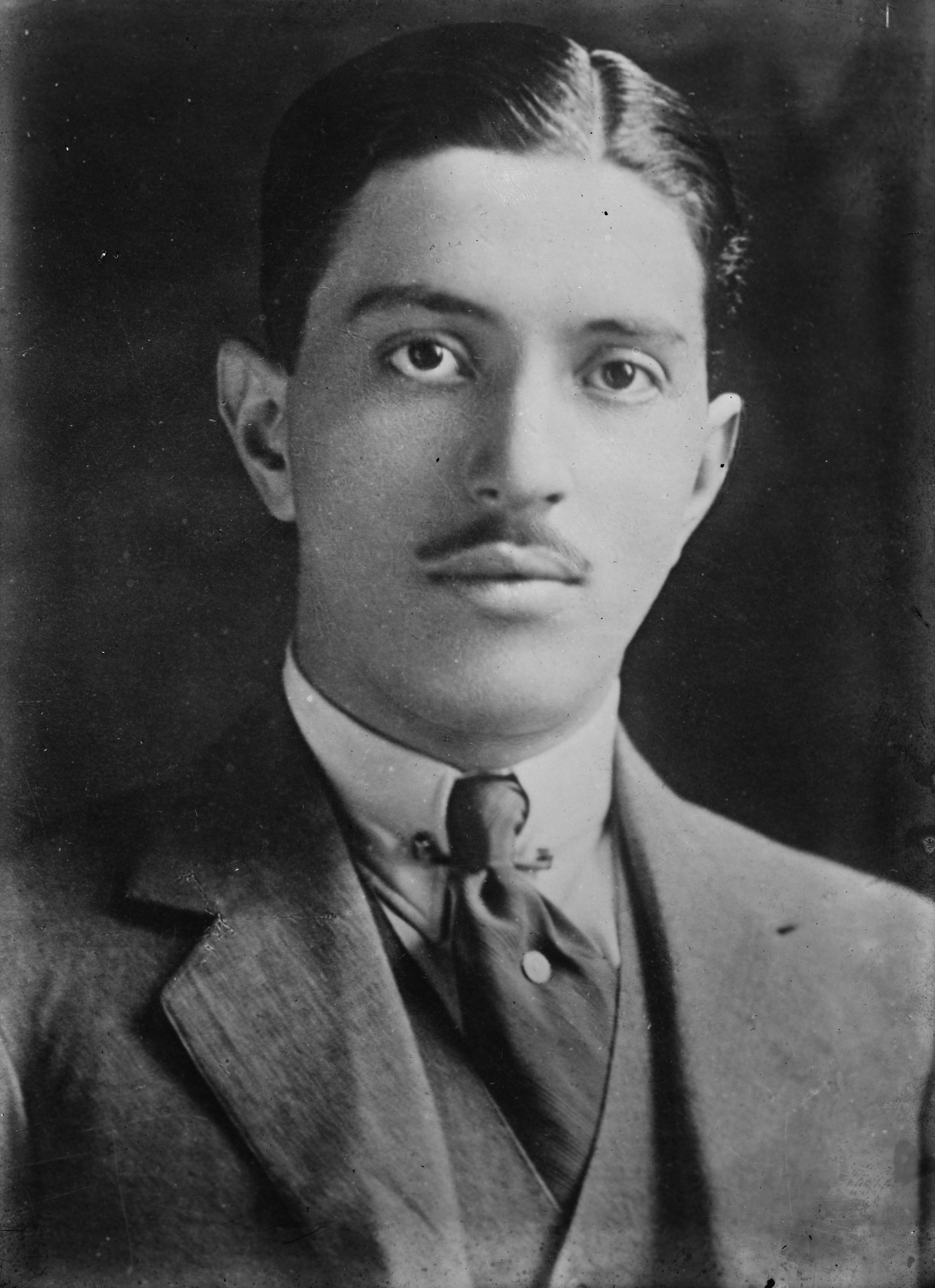
- Creator Albert de Courville
- Music: H. G. Pether, Rupert Hazell, Oliver Wallace, Harold Weeks
- Lyrics: H. G. Pether, Rupert Hazell, Harold Weeks
- Book: Albert de Courville
- Productions: 1919 West End

Joy Bells was a revue staged at the London Hippodrome at the end of World War I. It was devised by Albert de Courville, with music and lyrics by H. G. Pether, Rupert Hazell, Oliver Wallace, Harold Weeks and others. The revue opened on 25 March 1919, starring George Robey, Fred Allandale, Phyllis Bedells, Anita Elson, Leon Errol, Shirley Kellogg and Daphne Pollard. It ran for 723 performances.

== Background ==
During the later half of the war and immediately thereafter, revues and musical comedies were in great demand; London hits during the period included The Bing Boys Are Here and Zig-Zag! (both starring Robey), Chu Chin Chow, Theodore & Co, The Happy Day, The Maid of the Mountains, The Boy and Yes, Uncle!. The audiences wanted light and uplifting entertainment, and these shows delivered it.

== Description and reception ==
Robey interpolated into Joy Bells two of his music hall sketches: "No, No, No" centred on turning innocent, everyday sayings into suggestive and provocative maxims, and "The Rest Cure" told the story of a pre-op hospital patient who hears worrying stories of malpractice from his well-meaning friends who visit him.

Reviews were generally warm, with Emilio Cecchi writing in the Italian newspaper La Tribuna: "Robey, just by being Robey, makes us laugh until we weep. We do not want to see either Figaro or Othello; it is quite enough for Robey to appear in travelling costume and to turn his eyes in crab-like fashion from one side of the auditorium to another. Robey's aspect in dealing with his audience is paternal and, one might say, apostolic."

== Songs ==
- Unfinished Melody
- Holiday Girls
- Goodbye, Khaki
- Oh, You Wonderful Bird
- Wishing for You
- My Cushion Girl
- Operatic Jazzing Ball
- Joy Bells
- I Mean to Say
- Doff
- The Story of My Life
