= Shirley Kellogg =

American singer (born 1887)

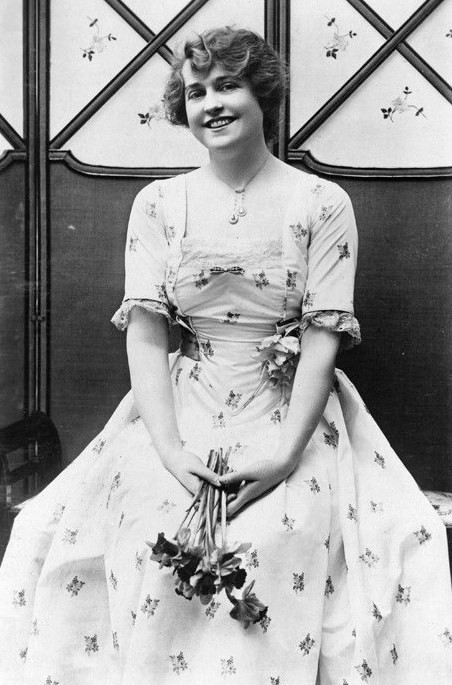
- From a postcard published by J. Beagles & Co. Ltd.
- Born: 27 May 1887; Minneapolis, Minnesota, U.S.
- Died: Unknown
- Other name: Mrs Albert de Courville
- Occupations: Actress; singer
- Spouse: Albert de Courville (m. 1913; div. 1924)

Shirley Kellogg (born 27 May 1887 in Minneapolis, Minnesota) was an American actress and singer who found greater success in Britain than in America, mostly in revue.

== Early life ==
She was born on 27 May 1887 in Minneapolis, Minnesota.

== Career ==
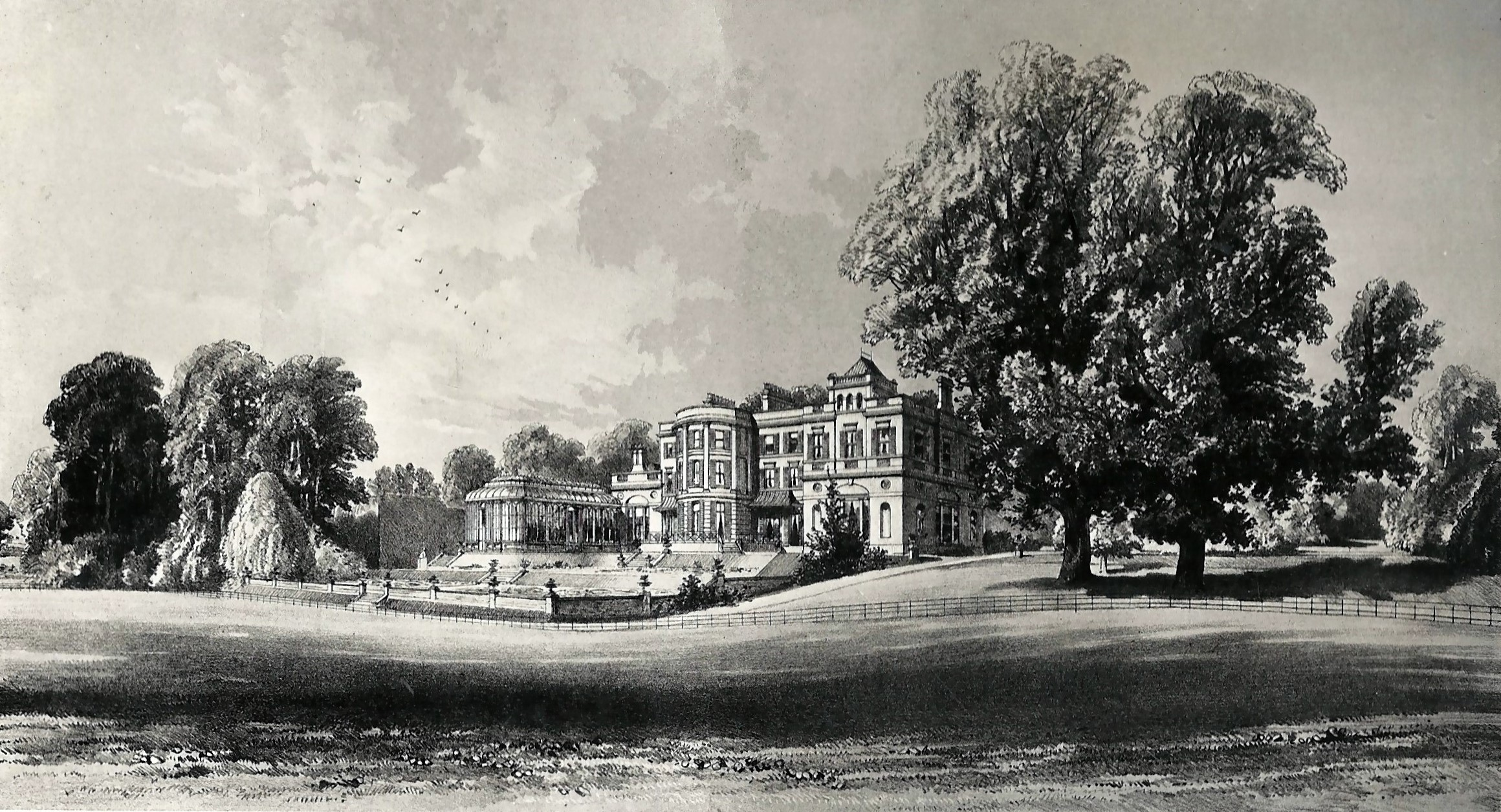
Little Grove, South Front, published by Kell Brothers of Holborn, c. 1860s.

She appeared in theatre, particularly at the London Hippodrome and married theatrical and later film director Albert de Courville in June 1913. In 1917 she was filmed promoting the introduction of the motor scooter to England. From 1921 to 1924 she owned Little Grove, a Georgian house in East Barnet which she was said to have spent £10,000 restoring, a very large amount of money at that time. The house was known as Shirley Grove during her ownership.

In 1924, Kellogg was granted a divorce from de Courville.

In 1924, Kellogg travelled to Hollywood to attempt to break into moving pictures and featured in silent films.

== Appearances ==
- Ziegfeld Follies of 1910.
- Hullo Ragtime! London Hippodrome, 1912.
- Are You There? The Prince of Wales's Theatre, London, 1913.
- Hullo Tango! 1913.
- Push and Go, London Hippodrome, 1915.
- Zig-Zag! London Hippodrome, 1917.
- Cheating Cheaters, Strand Theatre, 1918
- Joy Bells, London Hippodrome, 1919.

Also Toured with Eric Randolph in Venus Ltd
