= Daphne Pollard =

Australian-born actress, singer, and dancer (1891–1978)

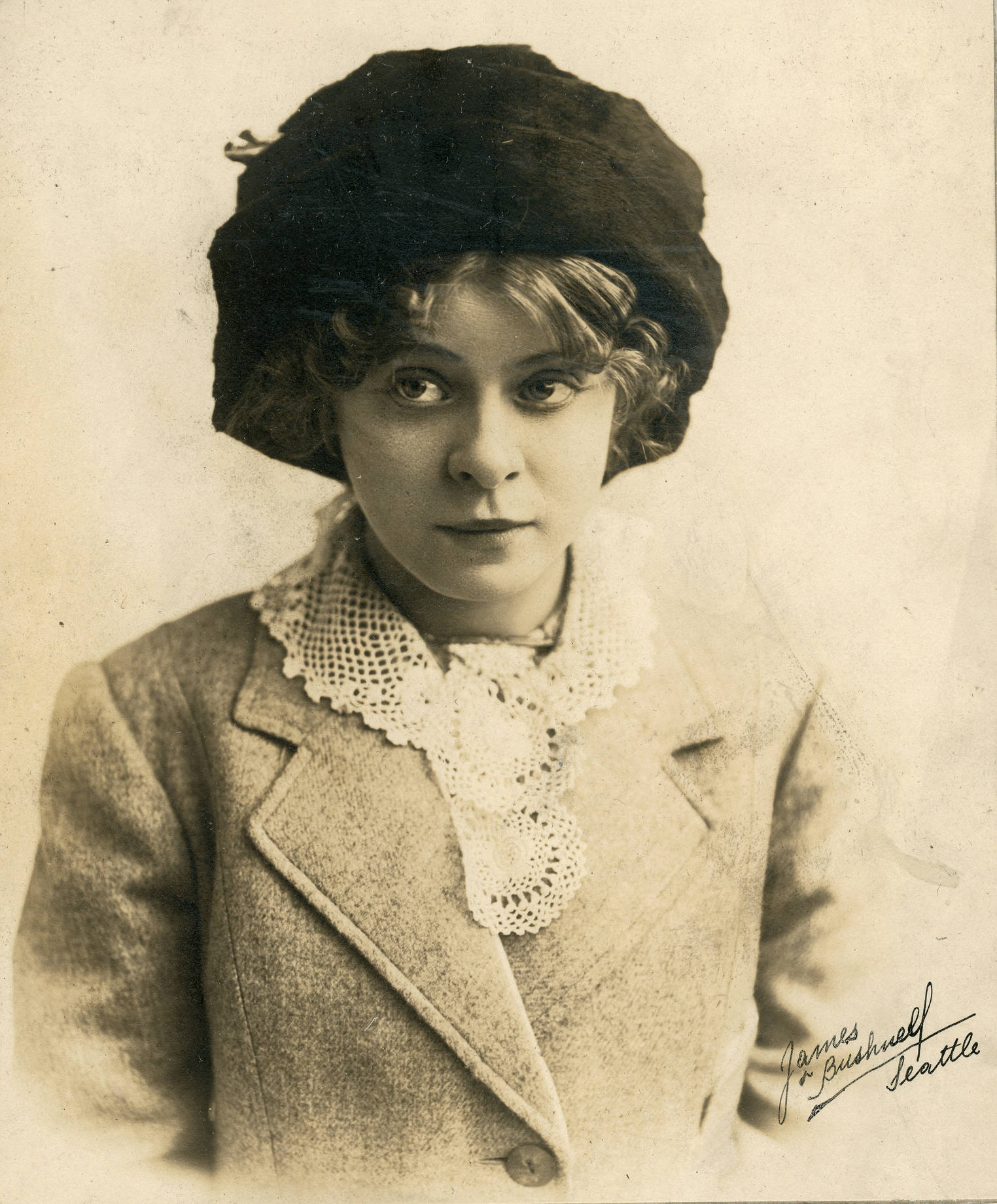
- Pollard in 1910
- Born: Daphne Trott; 19 October 1891; Fitzroy, Melbourne, Australia
- Died: 22 February 1978 (aged 86); Los Angeles, California, U.S.
- Resting place: Forest Lawn Memorial Park, Hollywood Hills
- Occupations: Vaudeville performer; Actress; Dancer; Singer
- Years active: 1897–1943
- Spouse: Ellington Strother Bunch (1911-1957) (his death) (1 child)
- Children: Ellington W. Bunch (born 1922)
- Parent(s): Walter William Trott and Annie (née Daniels) Trott

Daphne Pollard (born Daphne Trott; October 19, 1891 – February 22, 1978) was an Australian-born vaudeville performer and dancer, active on stage and later in American films, mostly short comedies. Between 1928 and 1935 she had almost 60 screen credits.

== Diminutive stage star ==
Born Daphne Trott, in the inner Melbourne suburb of Fitzroy, to Walter William Trott and Annie Trott (née Daniels), she joined the Pollard Lilliputian Opera Company at the age of six, having been taken to rehearsals by her older sister, Ivy, who was also a performer. The Pollard company featured performers whose ages ranged from six to sixteen years, playing light opera, operetta and musical comedy (LeCoq, Offenbach, etc.). They toured Australia, New Zealand and the United States in the late nineteenth and early twentieth centuries and were well received and highly acclaimed.

Like many of its performers, Daphne Trott took her stage name from the Pollard company. In later years she claimed she was related to the "cricketing Trotts," presumably meaning famous Australian cricketers Albert Trott and Harry Trott.

== Career in the US and UK ==
Daphne Pollard first arrived in Los Angeles during a company tour in September 1901 and was singled out in enthusiastic reviews. In a November 1903 review, the Los Angeles Herald reported that "Daphne has charm. A full contralto speaking voice, a fine mimicry and good health are her ordinary stock in trade possessions; her delightful small personality is the crown, and makes her every inch a little queen of comic opera." Following further tours of Australia, the company was again in North America from late 1905. By 1907, Pollard was confident and popular enough to strike out on her own. Her Broadway debut was in Eddie Foy's Mr. Hamlet of Broadway in 1908.

She appeared soon after in The Bohemian Girl at the Los Angeles Theater, at $60 per show. The Los Angeles Times reported that because she was small and not well-developed for her age, Humane Officers thought she was no more than seven. She convinced them that she was actually sixteen.

In October 1908, Pollard appeared with a New York company that performed musical and dramatic shows such as The Thief, The Chorus Lady, The Witching Hour, and Girls, among others. The productions were staged at the Grand Opera House. Among her fellow actors were Harry Macdonough and Charles Halton. Pollard appeared with the Ziegfeld Follies and in Winter Garden Theatre shows. In 1909, she was with a group which entertained at Keith and Proctor's Fifth Avenue Theater.

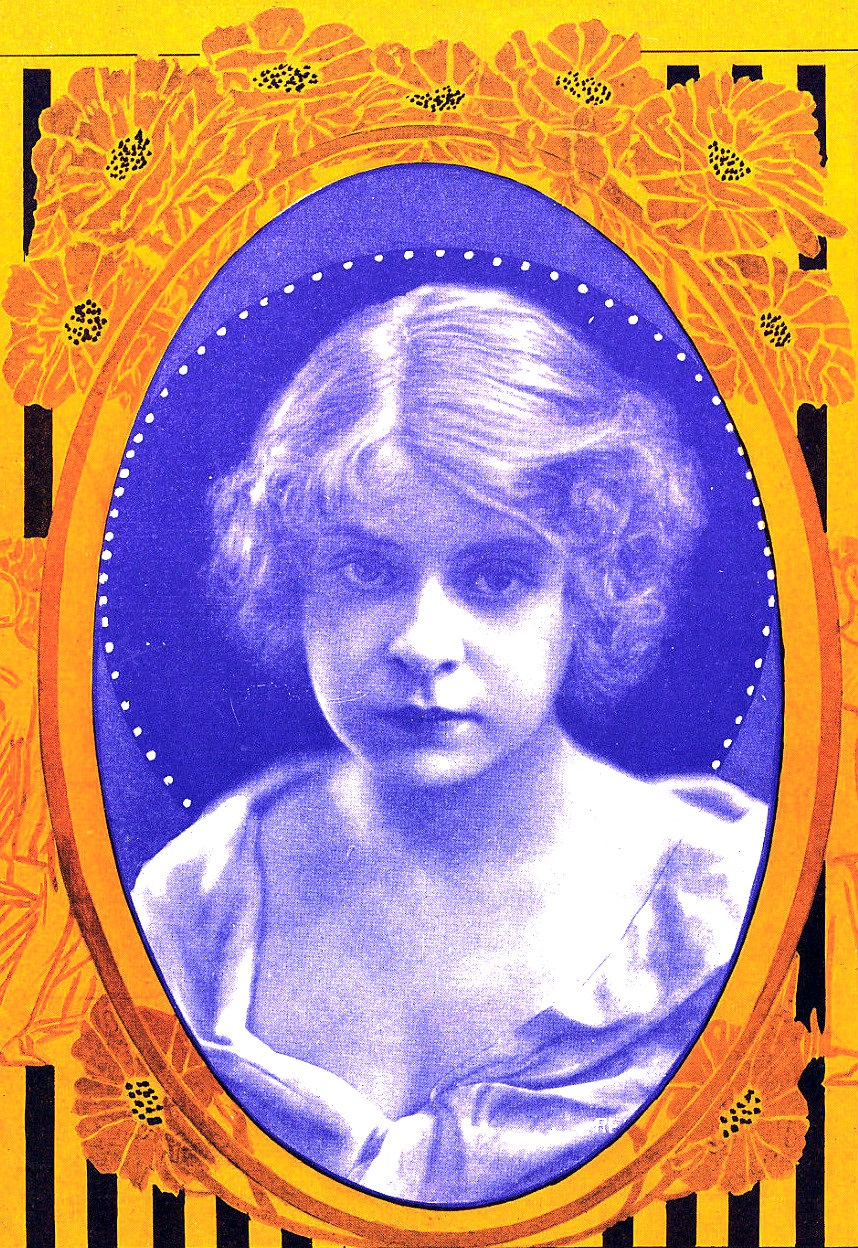
Pollard in The Passing Show of 1915

In 1914 Pollard was the petite star of The Girl Behind the Counter at the Morosco Theatre on Broadway (Manhattan). The production also featured actor Al Shean. She followed this success with performances in A Knight for a Day (1915) and The Passing Show of 1915. The latter play was staged at The Mason Theater in Los Angeles and also featured Marilyn Miller.

In 1917, Pollard was in London, where she appeared with English comedian/singer George Robey, playing the role of "She of the Tireless Tongue" in Albert de Courville, Dave Stamper and Gene Buck's lavishly staged revue Zig-Zag!, which ran for 648 performances at the Hippodrome. She remained with the show when it moved to the Folies Bergère in Paris at the end of the year. She appeared in other successful productions at the Hippodrome, including Box o' Tricks (1918), Joy Bells (1919) and Jig-Saw! (1920). She returned to New York and performed in The Greenwich Village Follies in 1923–24.

== Hollywood screen comedian ==
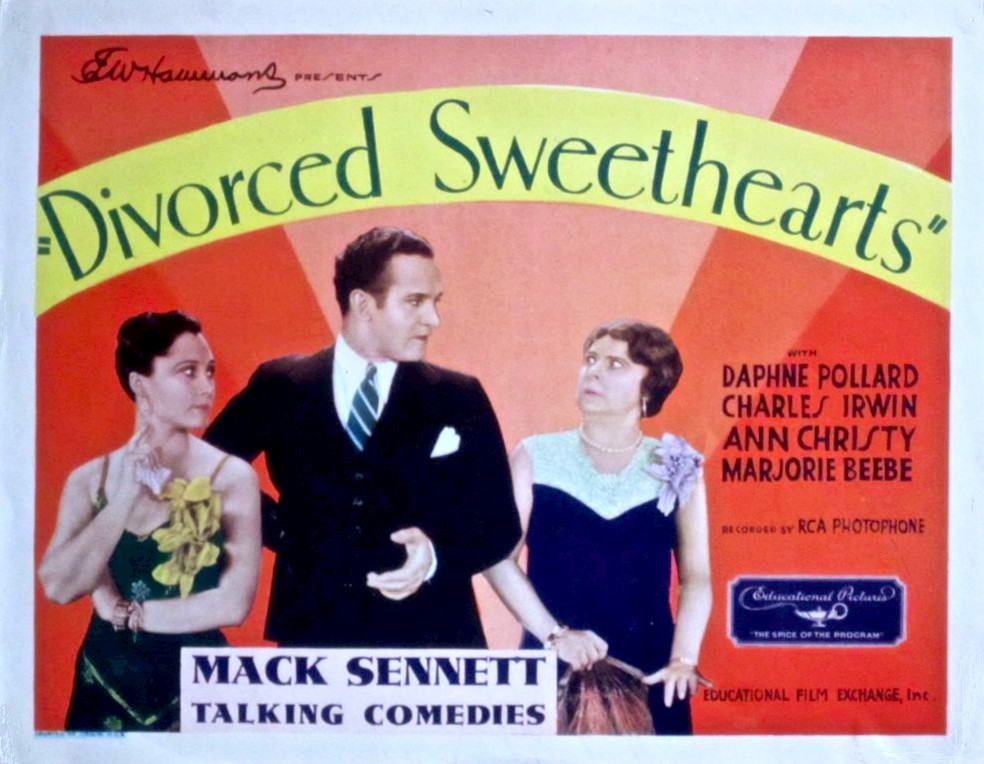
Pollard (right) in a character role in the 1930 comedy short Divorced Sweethearts

After a long career on stage and aged in her late thirties, Mack Sennett signed her with great fanfare in June 1927, describing her as an "internationally famous musical comedy and vaudeville star." She was cast in several "Sennett Girl Comedies," two-reel productions designed to show off the beauty of Sennett's latest actresses. Other actresses featured in the girl comedy shorts were Carole Lombard, Anita Barnes, and Kathryn Stanley. Her first title was The Girl from Everywhere, with Pollard receiving title billing. Some of these films included short, two-strip Technicolor sequences. In these first movies for Sennett, Pollard demonstrated her talents as a comedian and dancer. Lombard and Pollard became close friends during the time they were working for Sennett. "Daphne Pollard and I were just in hysterics the whole time," Lombard recalled in 1929. "We used to pull some of the worst gags on Matty Kemp and some of the boys over there. You should have seen that lot when the boys ran riot with water hoses. Daphne Pollard, who was a real [Sennett] bathing girl because in every picture she made they turned the hose on her, was the best sport of the whole gang." In 1928 Sennett canceled all talent contracts and retooled his studio for the new talking pictures. Lombard commented on this: "I remember when she and I got our final notices that the studio was going to close down. Well, that was the only time we were out of hysterics on that lot."

Pollard went on to work for RKO-Pathe, Universal Pictures, and finally Vitaphone. At the Vitaphone studio in Brooklyn, in 1934 and 1935, she was teamed with vaudeville comedian Shemp Howard for three knockabout two-reel comedies. These were directed by Lloyd French, who had been on the payroll of producer Hal Roach. In 1935 Roach signed her to work in Hollywood with Laurel and Hardy. She continued to appear in occasional supporting roles into the early 1940s, her final role was a gag appearance in Laurel & Hardy's The Dancing Masters (1943).

== Personal life ==
In July 1911, aged 19, she married Ellington Strother Bunch, a journalist.

Pollard's parents and five of her siblings joined her in the United States after 1911, settling in Seattle. An older sister, Hilda, who had married, stayed in Melbourne.

In early 1928, together with other former Pollard Lilliputan Opera Company members, she attended the Hollywood funeral of comedian Ted McNamara following his sudden death from pneumonia.

Daphne Pollard died in Los Angeles in 1978, aged 86.

== Partial filmography ==
- The Crossroads of New York (1922) - Minor Role
- The Girl from Everywhere (1927) - Minnie Stitch
- Run, Girl, Run (1928, Short) - Coach Minnie Marmon
- Love at First Flight (1928, Short) - Polly Polka - Dance Instructor
- The Swim Princess (1928, Short) - Sally Forthe
- Hit of the Show (1928) - The Slavey
- The Good-Bye Kiss (1928) - Minor Role (uncredited)
- The Girl from Nowhere (1928, Short) - Tillie Tucker - Wardrobe Mistress
- The Campus Carmen (1928, Short) - Tillie Toober
- Sinners in Love (1928) - Mabel
- The Campus Vamp (1928, Short) - Dora
- The Old Barn (1929, Short) - The School Teacher
- Big Time (1929) - Sybil
- South Sea Rose (1929) - Mrs. Nott
- The Sky Hawk (1929) - Minnie
- Loose Ankles (1930) - Agnes
- Swing High (1930) - Mrs. May
- America or Bust (1930, Short) - Arriet Emingway
- What a Widow! (1930) - Masseuse
- Bright Lights (1930) - Mame Avery
- Divorced Sweethearts (1930, Short) - Aunt Louise
- Don't Bite Your Dentist (1930, Short) - Mrs. Edward Martin
- Help Wanted, Female (1931, Short) - Mrs. Hemingway
- The Lady Refuses (1931) - Millie - Apartment House Maid
- She Snoops to Conquer (1931, Short) - Daphne
- Slide, Speedy, Slide (1931, Short) - Myrtle Brady
- Crashing Reno (1931, Short)
- Fast and Furious (1931, Short)
- Oh! Marry Me (1931, Short)
- Sold at Auction (1931, Short) - Daphne, the Working Girl
- Straight Goods (1931, Short)
- Monkey Shines (1932, Short)
- His First Flame (1934, Short) - Emmy (With Shemp Howard)
- Peach of a Pair (1934, Short) - Cook (With Shemp Howard)
- Smoked Hams (1934, Short) - Emma Pollard
- Thicker than Water (1935, Short) - Mrs. Daphne Hardy
- Bonnie Scotland (1935) - Millie - the Maid
- Our Relations (1936) - Mrs. Daphne Hardy
- Tillie the Toiler (1941) - Mumsy Tomkins
- Kid Dynamite (1943) - Mrs. McGinnis
- The Dancing Masters (1943) - Mother at Dancing School (uncredited) (final film role)

== See also ==
- Fort Wayne Journal-Gazette, "The Littlest Soubrette On Broadway", July 4, 1915, p. 8.
- Los Angeles Times, "Bare Legs Catch Eye", Apr. 13, 1914, p. III4.
- Los Angeles Times, "Show World Review", May 11, 1916, p. II6.
- Los Angeles Times, "Daphne Pollard with Sennett", June 4, 1927, p. A6.
- Los Angeles Times, "Three Comedy Units Under Way at Sennett Studio", July 17, 1927, p. C11.
- The New York Times, "Brooklyn Amusements", Oct. 4, 1908, p. X2.
- The New York Times, "Vaudeville", Apr. 18, 1909, p. X8.
- The New York Times, "News and Gossip of Vaudeville", May 18, 1924, p. X2.
