= Little Nellie Kelly (musical) =

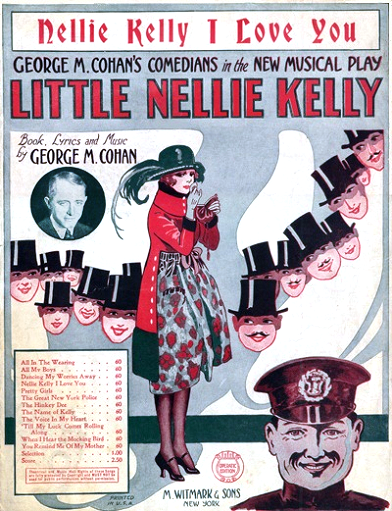
- Cover of sheet music, 1922
- Music: George M. Cohan
- Lyrics: George M. Cohan
- Book: George M. Cohan
- Basis: Romance
- Productions: 1922–1923 Broadway; 1923–1924 West End

Little Nellie Kelly was a two-act musical comedy of the Jazz Age, written, produced and directed by George M. Cohan. After opening in Boston in July 1922, it had long runs on Broadway in 1922–1923, in the West End of London in 1923–1924, and on tours.

== Plot ==
Nellie Kelly is the daughter of a New York City Irish-American police officer, Captain John Kelly. After taking a job in DeVere's Department Store, she is seen and admired by the young millionaire and man-about-town Jack Lloyd. However, she is already loved by Jerry Conroy, a laborer who like her is Irish. When she refuses Lloyd's request for a date, he invites all the store's employees to a party at a house on Fifth Avenue belonging to his aunt, the redoubtable Mrs. Chesterfield Langford, with a view to getting to know Nellie better, and Conroy attends the party uninvited. During the evening, a valuable string of pearls belonging to Mrs. Langford is stolen, and suspicion falls on Conroy, while Lloyd pursues Nellie. In the end Conroy's name is cleared and the course of true love leads Nellie to refuse Lloyd and fall into the arms of Conroy.

== Songs ==
The musical contains the hit song "Nellie Kelly, I Love You", sung by Conroy, who also sings "You Remind Me of My Mother". Other songs include "All in the Wearing", "Dancing My Worries Away", "Till My Luck Comes Rolling Along", "They're All My Boys", "The Voice in My Heart", "The Busy Bees of DeVere's" and "The Dancing Detective".

A song-book, including the music and lyrics of all the show's songs, was published in 1922 by M. Witmark & Sons of New York.

== Productions ==
Little Nellie Kelly opened at the Tremont Theatre, Boston, on 31 July 1922 and arrived at the Liberty Theatre on Broadway on 13 November 1922, where it ran for nine months. Its total of 276 performances in New York was more than for any of George M. Cohan's other musicals.

Towards the end of February 1923, C. B. Cochran announced plans for a separate production of the show to open at the New Oxford Theatre in London's West End on 20 April. By 26 April no firm opening date had been fixed, but Roy Royston, Anita Elson, and the Forde Sisters had been engaged to appear. At the end of June the opening of the show was finally announced for the New Oxford Theatre on 2 July. It ran in London until 16 February 1924, with a total of 255 performances. Little Nellie Kelly was succeeded at the New Oxford by the film Three Weeks, after which the company presented the show in other theatres. At the beginning of April 1924 it was playing at the Golders Green Hippodrome.

After the show closed in London, a touring company set off, with Daisy Burrell in the part of Nellie. The production was at the Royal Lyceum Theatre, Edinburgh, from 17 to 29 November 1924, when the cast consisted of Reginald Purdell, Sylvia Caine, Arthur Brander, Patrina Carlyon, Bernard Clifton, Bryan Danzil, Babs Farren, Madge Haines, Edwin Henderson, Eileen Leslie, George McCloskie, Hugh Reading, Charles Ross, and Tom Woods.

The musical was produced in Australia by Benjamin Fuller, Hugh J. Ward and John Fuller for Hugh J. Ward Theatres Ltd. It opened on December 22, 1923, at the New Princess Theatre, Melbourne; Harry Hall directed and choreographed under the supervision of Ward, with musical direction by Willy Redstone. It played in Melbourne for four months, then at the Grand Opera House, Sydney, for ten weeks from mid-August 1924. The production included two interpolated numbers composed by Redstone: "I Want a Man" and "Romany Tango".

== Reception ==
The New York critics considered the piece to be an old-fashioned and sentimental Edwardian musical comedy which was out of place in 1922, but despite this it proved a huge success.

The reviews of the London opening night on 2 June 1923 were good. The Times said "Better than the average musical comedy and as good as any that has been in London", the Pall Mall Gazette "the best thing we have had since The Belle of New York", the Star "a real novelty full of swift surprises, haunting melodies, dancing phenomena, and playful burlesque". The Daily Telegraph made a prediction: "For months all New York has been drawn to see, to listen to, and to applaud Little Nellie Kelly, and London is going to follow its example for an even longer period."

== Roles and original casts – Broadway/West End/Melbourne ==
- Nellie Kelly – Elizabeth Hines / "June" / Mamie Watson
- Jack Lloyd – Barratt Greenwood / Roy Royston / Eric Masters
- Jerry Conroy – Charles King / Ralph Whitehead / Leyland Hodgson
- Captain John Kelly of the NYPD – Arthur Deagon / James B. Donovan / Mark Daly
- Mrs. Chesterfield Langford, Lloyd's aunt – Georgia Caine / Maidie Hope / May Beatty
- Miss Spendington, a costumier – Peggy McClure / Constance Worth / Dorothy Roberts
- Jean, a modiste – Dorothy Newell / Marie Lee / Ena Dale
- Harold Westcott, a friend of Lloyd's – Joseph Niemeyer / Arthur Denton / Robert Jackson
- Sidney Potter, a friend of Lloyd's – Frank Otto / Sonnie Hale / Ireland Cutter
- Francois DeVere, owner of DeVere's Store – Robert Pitkin / Henry de Bray / Lou Vernon
- Marie Langford, Lloyd's cousin – Marion Saki / Anita Elson / June Roberts
- Ambrose Swift, a society detective – Mercer Templeton / Frank Masters / Melbourne Ward
- Wellesly, the butler – Harold Vizard / Clifford Heatherley / Alex. McPherson
- Matilda, the housekeeper – Edna Whistler / Dorothy Monkman / Maudie Vera
- Specialty Dancers – Aileen Hamilton, Carl Hemmer, James Templeton, the Lorraine Sisters / Terri Storri, Santry & Norton, the Forde Sisters / Hazel Harris & Westley Pierce

Sources – Broadway, West End and Melbourne

== Film adaptation ==
The 1940 musical film Little Nellie Kelly, starring Judy Garland, was broadly based on the stage production, and some songs from it were repeated in the film. However, there was a new script, and the story was changed.
