= Are You There? =

- Opera by Ruggero Leoncavallo
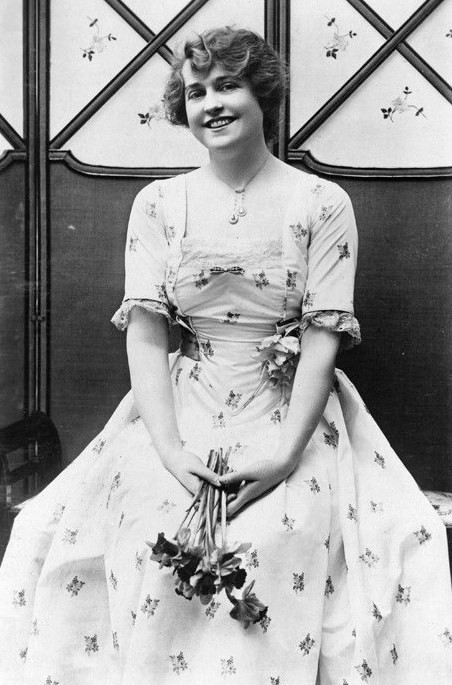
- Shirley Kellogg, the star of the "farcical musical play in two acts"
- Librettist: Albert de Courville; Edgar Wallace
- Language: English
- Premiere: 1 November 1913; The Prince of Wales Theatre, London

Are You There? is a "farcical musical play in two acts" composed by Ruggero Leoncavallo (with interpolations by Lewis F. Muir) with a book by Albert de Courville and lyrics by Edgar Wallace. Also described as an "operette" by Variety, it premièred unsuccessfully on 1 November 1913 at The Prince of Wales Theatre, London to a rowdy audience which almost became a riot. Its star, Shirley Kellogg, was Courville's wife.

== Composition history ==
There was considerable pre-opening-night publicity in the press emphasizing the involvement of Leoncavallo, given the success in London of his opera Zingari the previous year. A few days before the opening, The New York Times quoted the producer, Ned Wayburn, as saying: "Signor Leoncavallo was eager to write a farcical musical play to demonstrate that he could do it as well as grand opera. The music reminds me of Victor Herbert at his best, although the style is Leoncavallo's own." In fact, it had very little music, and rumours on the opening night suggested that it was an expansion of a short musical sketch by the composer into two acts.

== Performance history ==
The first night proved extremely unsuccessful, being met by loud "boos" and a rowdy audience. The production closed within 23 days.

Ned Wayburn was reportedly dragged to the stage, where he attempted to give a speech amongst the jeers, and claimed the audience was "unable to appreciate a real novelty". The star, the wife of Albert de Courville, Shirley Kellogg said that the cast had done their best, and that she was disappointed that the audience, who had always supported her in her days as a star, were so vehemently against this production.

Kellogg subsequently recorded the waltz "Roseway" from the show for His Master's Voice and continued to sing it in the revue Hullo Tango which opened at the London Hippodrome in December 1913 and ran for 485 performances.

== Synopsis ==
Sylvia becomes a telephone exchange employee in order to learn government secrets, and hopes to obtain for her father a baronetcy. In turn, he furthers the scheme by working as a mechanic in a building. A young gentleman, Gregory Lester, who hears her voice on the telephone comes to the exchange to find its owner. Succeeding, he takes her to the Casino at Nice, France. Lawrence Grossmith played the manager of the telephone exchange.
