= The Campus Vamp =

1928 film

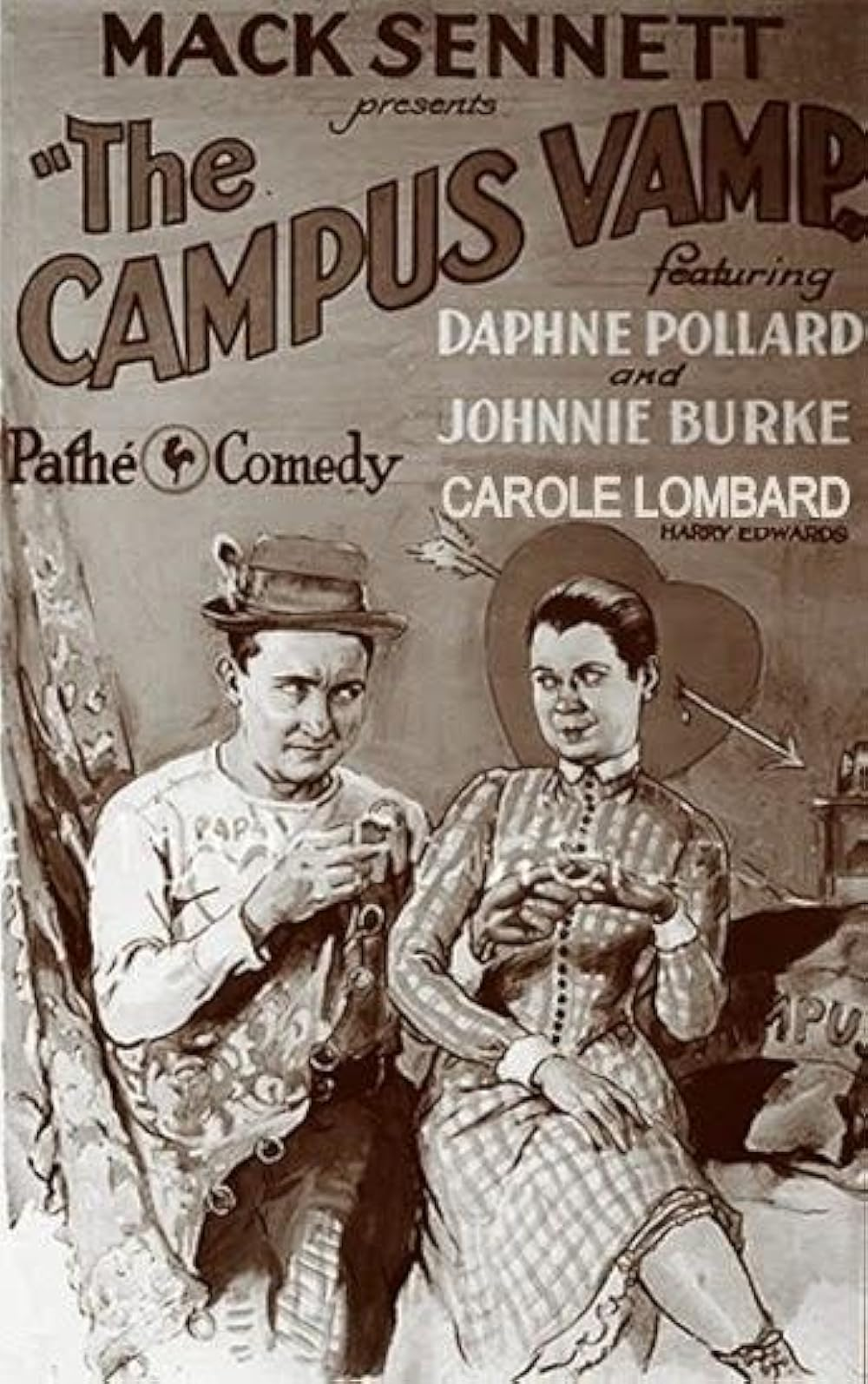
- Directed by: Harry Edwards
- Written by: Ewart Adamson (writer); Carl Harbaugh (writer); Jefferson Moffitt (writer); Earle Rodney (writer); Maurice Stevens (titles); Dan Thomas (titles); James J. Tynan (writer)
- Starring: Daphne Pollard; Sally Eilers; Carole Lombard
- Cinematography: Fred Dawson
- Edited by: William Hornbeck
- Distributed by: Mack Sennett Comedies; Pathé Exchange
- Release date: September 23, 1928
- Running time: 2 reels
- Country: United States
- Language: Silent (English intertitles)

The Campus Vamp is a 1928 American silent comedy short starring Daphne Pollard and Johnny Burke. "This early Mack Sennett comedy features a young Carole Lombard as well as the early two color Technicolor film" for a beach sequence that includes a game of beach baseball.

== Plot ==
The film starts with a very short color sequence of several bathing beauties waving to camera.

We are told we are in Beverly College. Two intellectuals, Matty and Sally are studying, meanwhile Carole is driving around with a group of friends having fun.

The comedy begins with Barney Benson, whom we are told was hoping to work his way through college, who is cleaning rooms in the college with his girlfriend Dora. They see Matty flirting with Carole much to the annoyance of Sally, whose room they are cleaning. The female Dean inspects Barney and Dora's work. They try to look busy. Barney is compared to Buster Brown, a comic-strip character of the times. Dora gets flattened between the bed springs and the mattress by Barney who is not paying attention to where she is. Barney an Dora give Sally tips and show her how they neck in their auto... a mime ensues. They then mime boating on the river but are interrupted by the Dean who takes Dora away to tidy away a pile of large books.

We cut to the dance. Matty is dancing with Carole and Sally looks on sadly. Barney appears, dressed at his best and talks to Sally. He asks her to dance and she accepts. They retire from the dance-floor after a large girl steps on Barney's foot. His shoe splits at the sole and he creates a makeshift repair. Sally watches Carole showing off her flapper dress and doing the Charleston in front of Matty. The fat girl returns picks up the entire pile of straws and drinks all the punch. Dora goes to refill the punch-bowl, giving Barney a huge lump of ice to hold. It melts and makes it look like he has wet his trousers, and he slopes off. Dora returns and tries to sit sally on Matty's lap and make them kiss. But he sits on the wet patch left by Barney and jumps up. Sally thinks it is due to her. Carole takes advantage and jumps on his lap instead.

We jump to the beach and the film jumps to color. The students are playing baseball. Barney is the umpire. Sally helps to win the match and at last kisses Matty. Dora and Barney cuddle and have their own kiss.

== Cast ==
- Sally Eilers as Sally
- Matty Kemp as Matty
- Daphne Pollard as Dora
- Johnny Burke as Barney Benson
- Carole Lombard as Carole, the college vamp
- Leota Winters as Bathing Girl
- Kathryn Stanley as Bathing Girl
- Lucille Miller as Bathing Girl
- Anita Barnes as Bathing Girl
- Alice Ward as Dean
- Mary Wiggins a Student
- Jack Cooper as Handyman

== In popular culture ==
A film clip of Lombard from The Campus Vamp is used in Maxie (1985) as the only surviving fragment of the silent film actress.
