= Pollard's Lilliputian Opera Company =

Series of professional children's opera troupes

Pollard's Lilliputian Opera Company was series of professional children's troupes, first established in Launceston, Tasmania, in May 1880. Established by James Joseph Pollard, over the next thirty years several members of the Pollard family operated troupes under the same or similar names, travelling through Australia and New Zealand and later the Orient and North America.

== Juvenile performance troupes ==
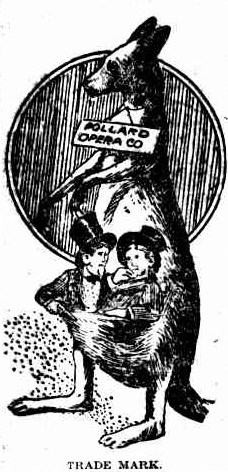
1907 Cartoon from Truth newspaper which shows a fanciful Pollard troupe logo

In the mid 1870s, James Pollard, a former organ maker and piano tuner, had formed a local musical group called Pollard's Orchestral Union, based around the musical and performing talents of his 18 children. After 1880, his Lilliputian Opera Company included other juvenile performers and developed an extensive and highly successful program of performances of comic opera and musical items, travelling throughout Australia and New Zealand. Gillian Arrighi and Victor Emeljanow suggest that the genesis of the juvenile performance of opera, of which the Pollard troupe was but one manifestation, can be found in Richard D'Oyly Carte's experiment with a children's performance of HMS Pinafore over the London Christmas season of 1879–1880. The novelty of talented youngsters performing theatre and variety "transmitted ...ideas about youth and empire, cleverness and the future" and made this form of theatre extremely popular. Dr Clay Djubal suggests it was a Melbourne juvenile performance of HMS Pinafore that influenced Pollard.

Years later, Daphne Trott (who like many of the performers adopted the surname Pollard as a stage name) recalled; "As a child actress... I had to know thirty six operas by heart. Once I played the part of an old sheriff with side-whiskers, although I was only twelve at the time. One of the side whiskers came off before the audience, but that, of course, made it all the funnier."

== Later fortunes of the company ==
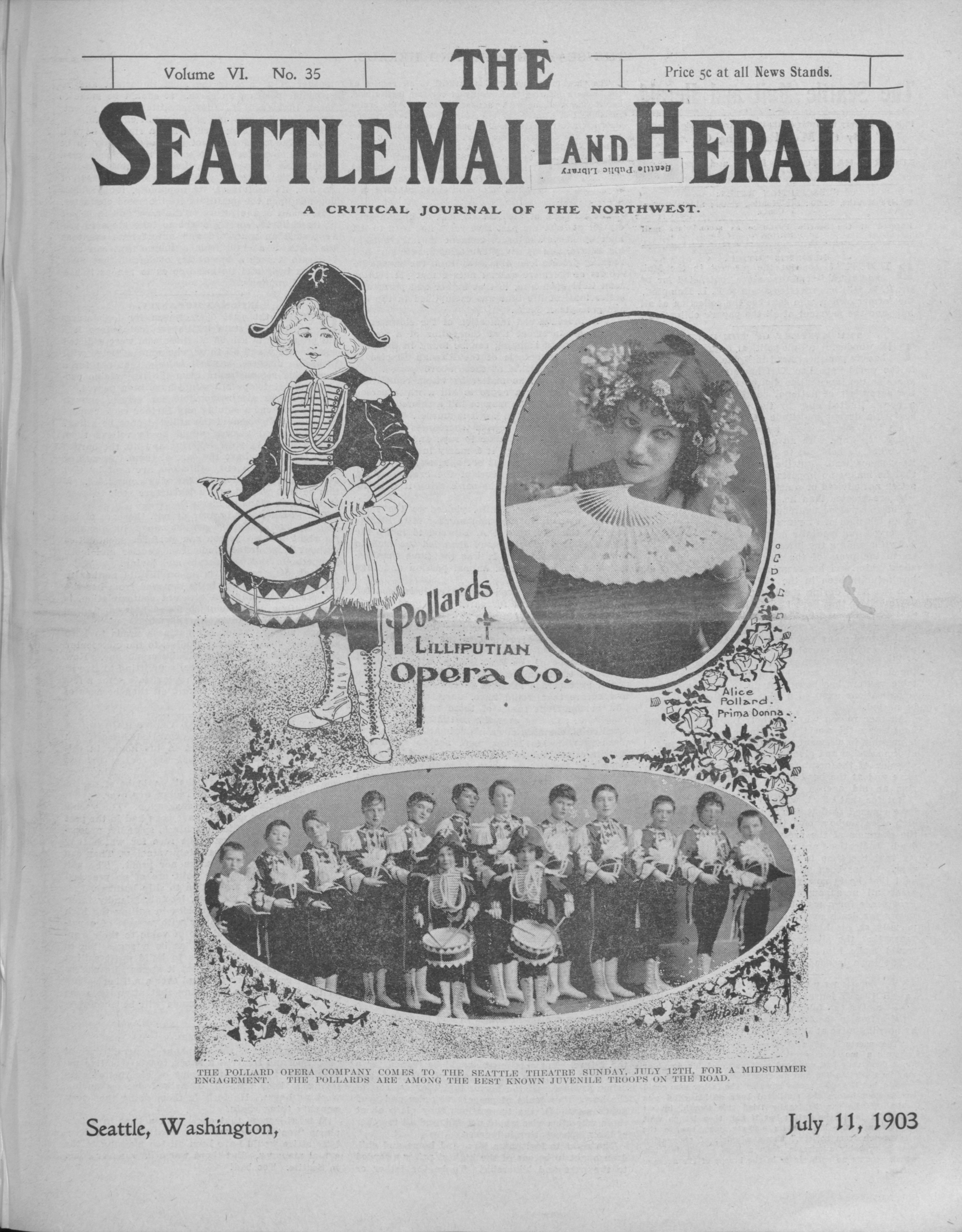
An ad for a 1903 appearance of Pollard's Lilliputian Opera Company in Seattle

Following James Pollard's death in 1884, the Company disbanded, later reforming under the ownership of various family members. After 1896 the company split, with a branch, using the original name and operated by Charles and Nellie Pollard (two of James' children) travelling through "the far east", Canada and the U.S.A. Pollard's Juvenile Opera Company operated in Australian and New Zealand, run by Tom O'Sullivan, who changed his surname to Pollard after marrying Emily Pollard.

In 1909, another member of the family, Arthur Hayden Pollard, raised a juvenile company to tour India via Ceylon and Malaya. However, following complaints about Arthur's treatment of the children and allegations of an inappropriately close association with one young performer, an Indian court withdrew his custody and the tour ended in confusion and chaos. In November 1910, the Australian Government passed legislation that required all children travelling outside the Commonwealth to hold a permit to do so. Despite this, and the bad publicity that the Indian tour had generated, a Pollard's troupe was active in North America as late as early 1916.

== Well-known performers ==
Numerous well-known Australian and New Zealand actors started their careers as child performers with the Pollard troupes, including baritone John Ralston. A number of former child performers who had experience with the Charles and Nellie Pollard troupe ended up staying on in North America and making their careers in Hollywood. These included Mae and Maud Beatty, Alf Goulding, Snub Pollard (Harold Fraser), Daphne Pollard (Daphne Trott), Billy Bevan (William Bevan Harris) and Ted McNamara.
