= Harold Weeks (musician) =

American jazz musician and composer

- Also known as: H. Taylor Weeks
- Born: March 28, 1893; Eagle Grove, Iowa
- Died: January 7, 1967 (aged 73)
- Genres: Jazz
- Occupations: Composer, songwriter, lyricist

Harold Taylor Weeks (March 28, 1893 – January 7, 1967) was an American jazz musician and composer from Seattle, Washington.

== Biography ==
Weeks was born in Iowa, but is usually associated with Seattle, Washington where he grew up and attended Queen Anne High School, where he became a nationally recognized ragtime composer by his junior year performing under the name H. Taylor Weeks. He then attended the University of Washington.

He is best known for his 1918 song "Hindustan", written with Oliver Wallace, which sold over one million copies and was widely played by dance orchestras and is today considered a jazz standard. The most notable version of the song was performed by the Joseph C. Smith orchestra. Other notable compositions included "Seattle Town", "No Fair Falling in Love", "My Honolulu Bride", "Ada" (with Victor Aloysius Meyers and Danny Cann), and "Isle of Dreams" (with Meyers and Wallace). He composed more than forty popular songs and was considered one of Seattle's most prolific composers.

Weeks was a member of the American Society of Composers, Authors and Publishers and the National Temperance League. He was a Christian and was actively involved with the Christian Science movement, including serving as a trustee for his church: Fourth Church of Christ, Scientist, Seattle. The church building later became Town Hall Seattle.

Weeks died in 1967. His correspondence, writings, sheet music, scrapbook, and phonograph records can be found at the University of Washington’s Special Collections library.
