= Zig-Zag! =

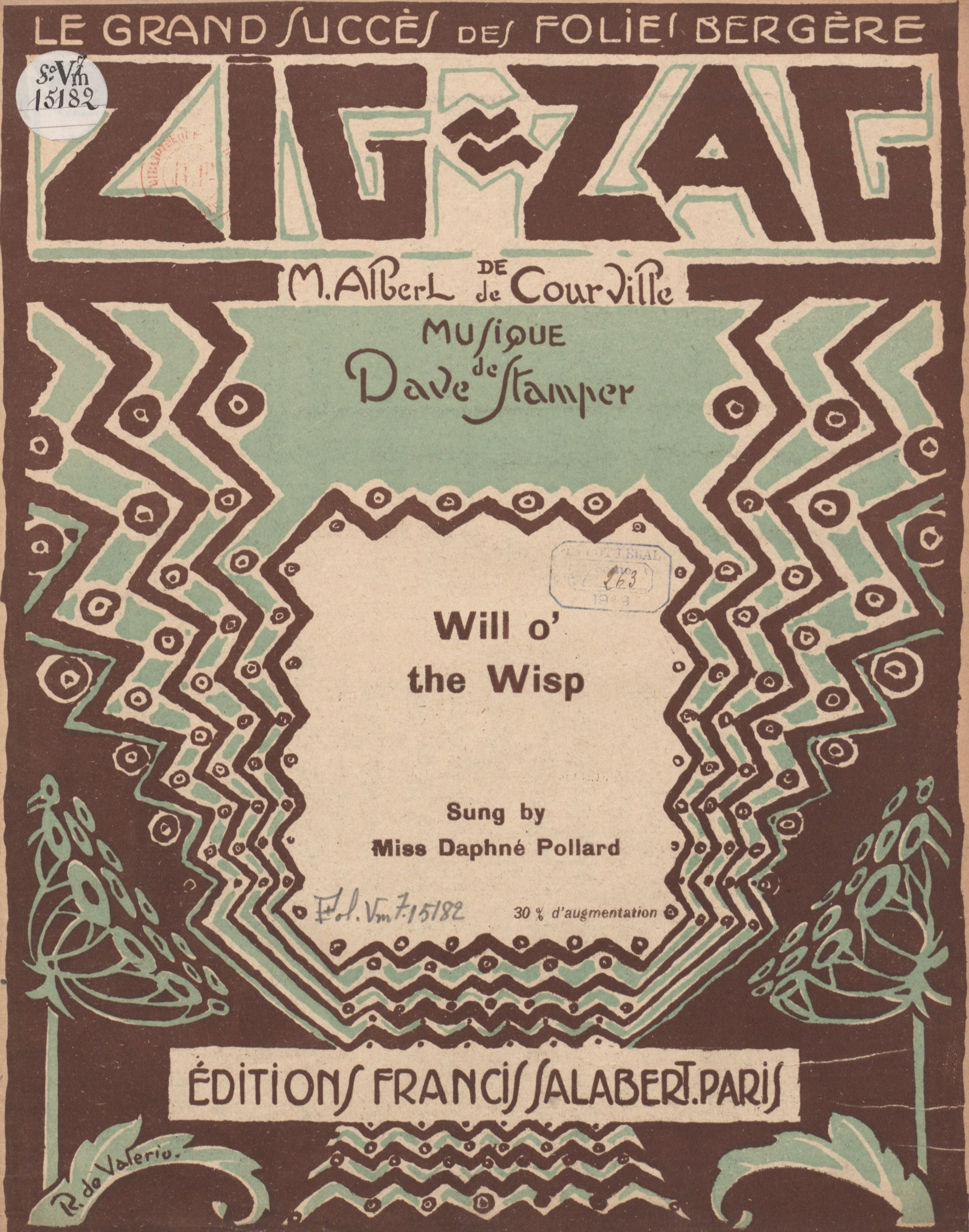
- Sheet music cover from a French edition
- Music: Dave Stamper and George M. Cohan
- Lyrics: Gene Buck and George M. Cohan
- Book: Albert de Courville, Wal Pink and George Arnold
- Productions: 1917 West End

Zig-Zag! was a revue staged at the London Hippodrome, London during World War I. It was devised by Albert de Courville, Wal Pink and George Arnold, with music by Dave Stamper (with arrangements and orchestrations by the musical director, Julian Jones), lyrics by Gene Buck, and additional songs by George M. Cohan. The revue opened on 31 January 1917 starring George Robey, Daphne Pollard, Cicely Debenham, Shirley Kellogg, Marie Spink and Bertram Wallis. It ran for 648 performances.

Robey interpolated a sketch into the show based on his music hall character "The Prehistoric Man", with Pollard playing the role of "She of the Tireless Tongue". In another scene, he played a drunken gentleman who had accidentally secured the box at the Savoy Theatre instead of an intended hotel room. The audience appeared unresponsive to the character, so he changed it mid-performance to that of a naive Yorkshire man. The change provoked much amusement, and it became one of the most popular scenes of the show. Zig-Zag ran for 648 performances.

During the later half of the war, revues and musical comedies were in great demand; other London hits running at the same time included The Bing Boys Are Here (also starring Robey, who left that show to join Zig-Zag!), Chu Chin Chow, Theodore & Co, The Happy Day, The Maid of the Mountains, The Boy and Yes, Uncle!. The audiences, which included soldiers on leave, wanted light and uplifting entertainment during the war, and these shows delivered it.

== Songs ==
- Will o' the Wisp
- In Grandma's Day
- When Autumn Leaves Are Falling
- Beware of Chu Chin Chow
- Bye and Bye You Will Miss Me
- Louana Lou
- Hello, My Dearie
- Somnambulistic Melody
- The Nightingale
- I'm a Ragtime Germ
- I Want Someone to Make a Fuss Over Me
- I Can Live Without You
- I Said Yes, I Would
- Burglar Jim
- Over There (by Cohan)
- Thumbs Up!
- She Spoke To Me First
- It Was a Deed That Spoke Louder Than Words
- Fishing
- Valse Song
