= John Beagles =

English printer and publisher

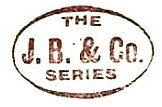
The John Beagles logo appearing on cards produced before his death

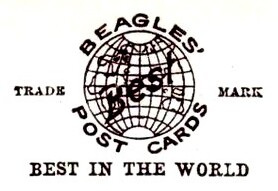
The logo of J. Beagles & Co. Ltd. used after the firm was incorporated following Beagles' death

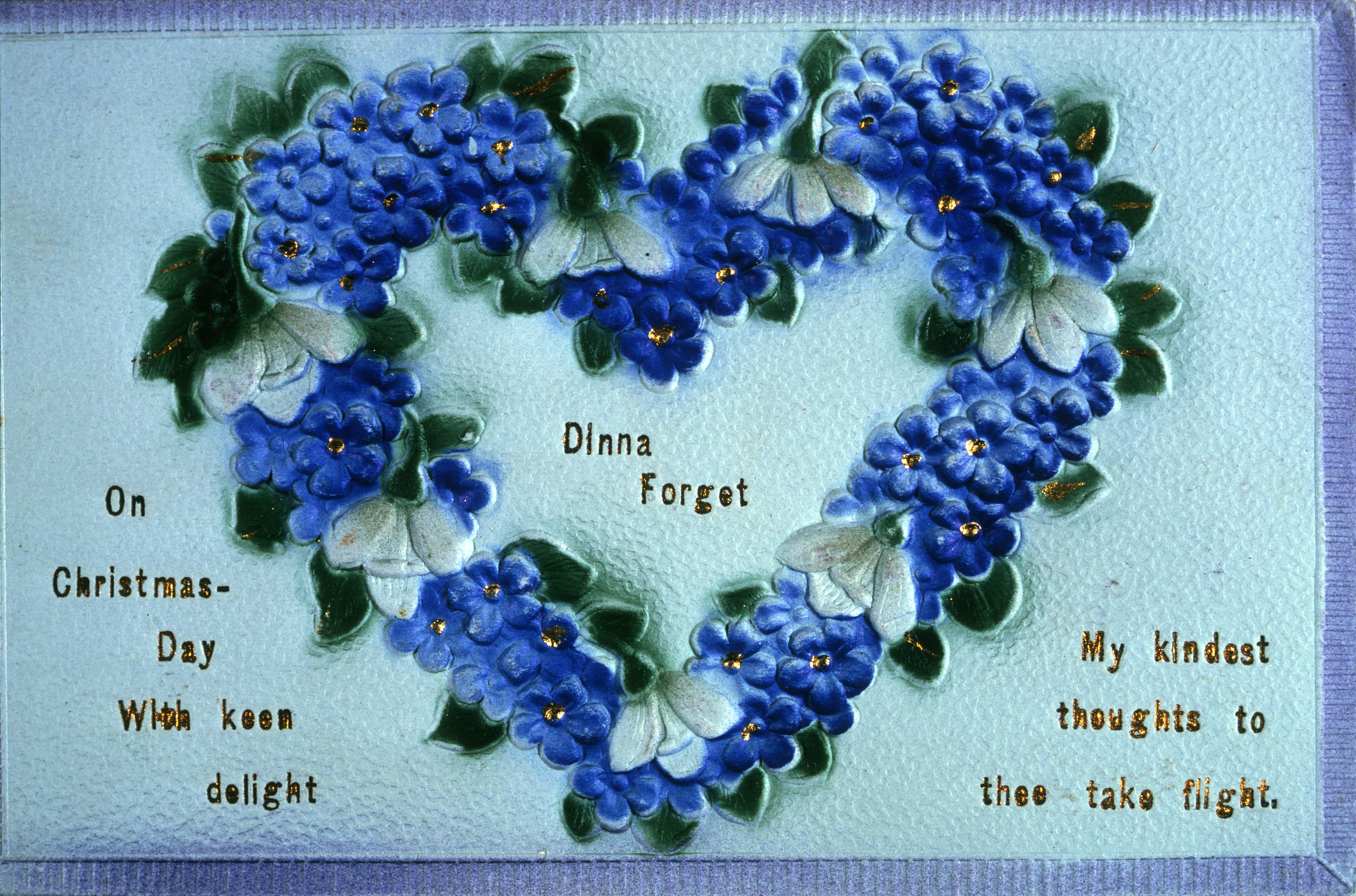
A Christmas card produced by Beagles, c. 1905-10

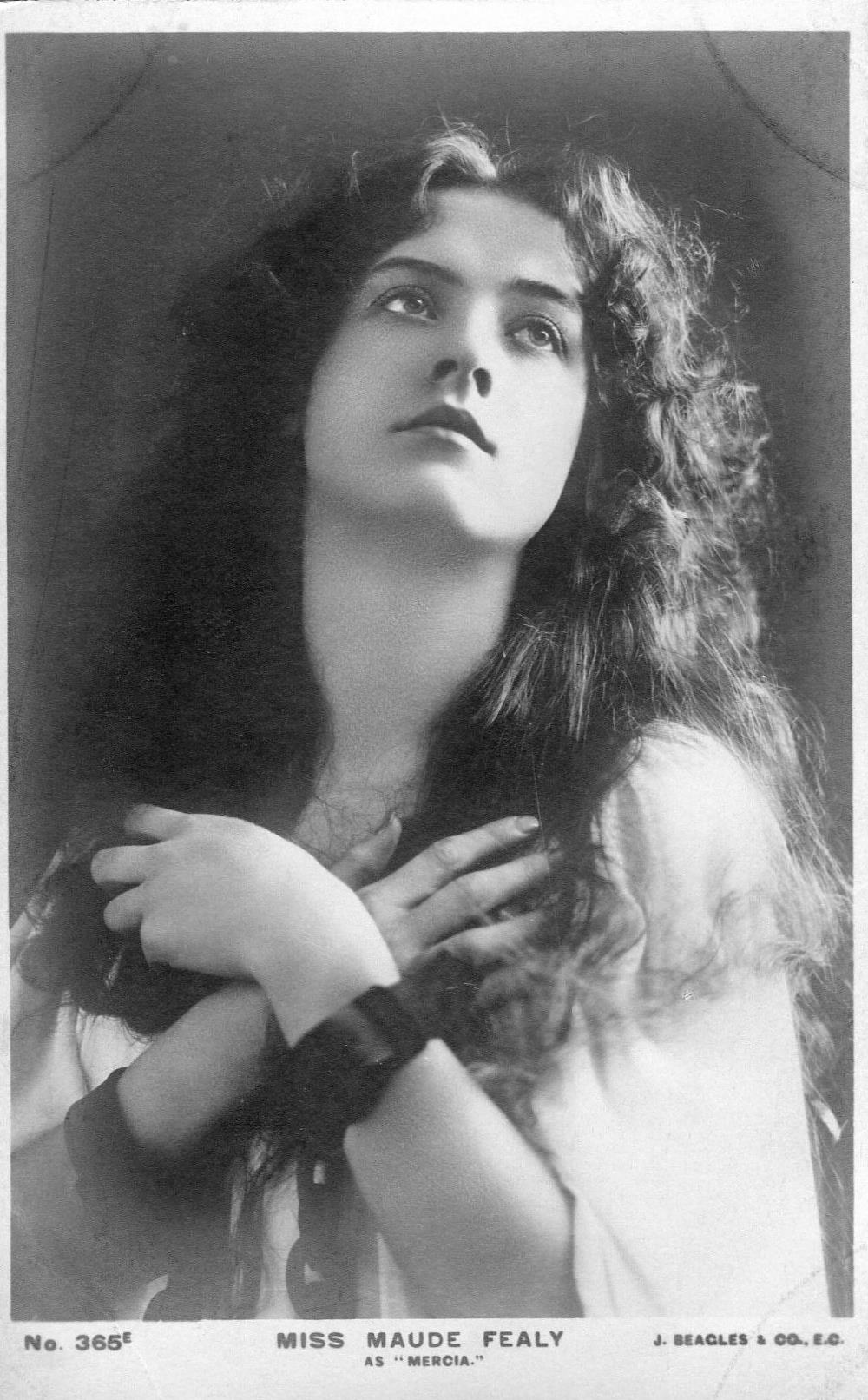
Maude Fealy as "Mercia" on a Beagles card

John Beagles (1844 – 8 January 1907) was an English printer and publisher, especially of real photo postcards, through his company, J. Beagles & Co.

== Early life ==
John Beagles was born in Whaplode Drove, Lincolnshire, in 1844 to John and Jane Beagles, and christened on 11 June 1844. His father was a "butcher master". In 1861, John Beagles junior was recorded as a "pupil teacher".

== J. Beagles & Co. ==
In the 1891 census, Beagles was recorded as a "photographic publisher" in Nottingham in the household of Thomas William Stevenson, printer, who would later be his executor. Later, he traded as J. Beagles & Co. from Little Britain, London, E.C.

Beagles and his successors produced a wide variety of postcards that included celebrities, stars of stage and screen, topographical and view cards in their Phototint series, and Louis Wain's Matrimonial Cats. The company also published a long series of scenes of London life such as The Telegraph Messenger and The Shoe Black, and humorous cards during the First World War. Often they republished, in postcard form, photographic portraits made by others.

The business continued as J. Beagles & Co. Ltd. after Beagles' death.

== Death ==
Beagles died at his home, 9 Rockley Road, Shepherd's Bush, London, on 8 January 1907. Probate was granted in London to Thomas William Stevenson on an estate of £554.
