= Anita Elson =

English actress, dancer and singer (1898–1985)

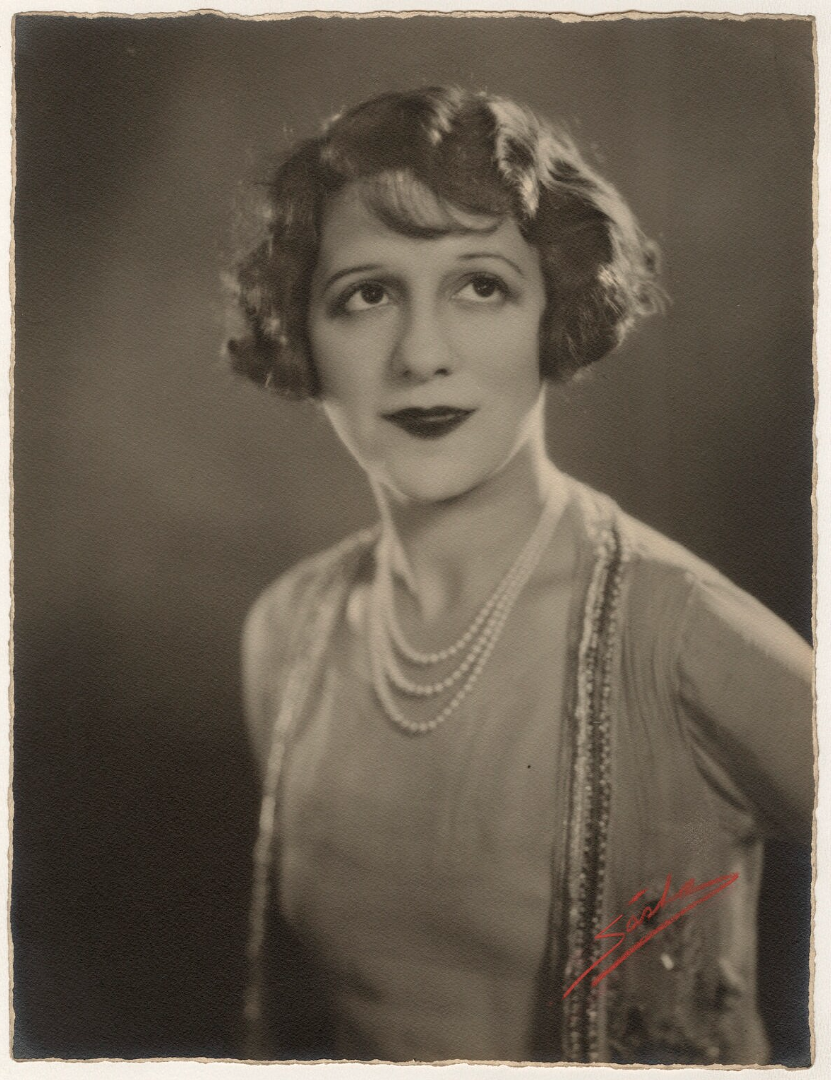
- Elson in 1929
- Born: Hannah Edelstein; 8 July 1898; Pancras, London, England
- Died: 29 September 1985 (aged 87); Newport Beach, California, U.S.
- Burial place: Fairhaven Memorial Park, Santa Ana, California, U.S.
- Other names: Hannah Prinsep; Anita Prinsep; Hannah Paddock; Anita Paddock
- Occupations: Actress, dancer, singer
- Spouses: Nick Prinsep (m. 1930; div. 1936) J. Howland Paddock (m. 1955; died 1963)
- Relatives: Valentine Cameron Prinsep (former father-in-law)
- Family: Prinsep (by marriage)

Hannah Paddock (née Edelstein; 8 July 1898 – 29 September 1985), known professionally as Anita Elson, was an English actress, dancer and singer. She was best known for appearing in revues in New York City and London during the early 20th century.

== Early life ==
Elson was born Hannah Edelstein (Note: Her family later changed their surname to Edelsten) in Pancras, London, England on 8 July 1898, as the daughter to William (Note: Per his birth registration, his name was Willem) Edelsten (1871–1951), a Dutch (Note: Her father was an Englishman who was born in Holland) theatrical manager, and his wife, Rebecca (née Levi; 1874–1958). She had two siblings, an elder brother, Cecil John A Edelstein (1896–1902), and a younger sister, Celestina (Note: Per her birth registration, her name was Celestine) Edelstein (1900–1922).

== Career ==
Elson, in the early 1900s, was one of a number (50) of starlets featured on cards given away by the Hignett cigarette company of Great Britain in their CHESS cigarette packets.

Elson performed in The Cohan Revue-(1916), a production of George M. Cohan. The show debuted at the Astor Theatre, New York City in February 1916. Cohan managed the venue and wrote the book, lyrics, and tunes for the presentation. A long list of entertainers who participated included Valli Valli, Elizabeth Murray, Lila Rhodes, and Juliet Delf.

Elson earned a spot in the cast of the 1924 Ziegfeld Follies after much success in the London production of Little Nellie Kelly.

Elson recorded a duet with Leo Franklyn and two songs with chorus and orchestra in London on 26 February 1926. These were from the Revue Turned Up at the New Oxford Theatre and were issued on HMV B2279-80.

== Personal life ==
Elson married her first husband, Nicholas John Andrew Leyland "Nick" Prinsep (1894–1983), an English stockbroker and divorcee who was a birth member of the Prinsep family as the youngest son to the British painter Valentine Cameron Prinsep, at the Register Office in St George Hanover Square, London on 7 January 1930. The entire ceremony was taped on a film camera that had been gifted to the couple by the actor and comedian Leslie Henson. For their honeymoon, they travelled to Yokohama, Los Angeles and New York arriving back in Liverpool on 9 June 1930. On 30 January 1934, the couple sailed to New York aboard the Isle de France; returning to Southampton on 23 February 1934. On 8 April 1936, after six years of marriage, in the London Divorce Court, she was granted a decree nisi of divorce from Prinsep on the grounds of his adultery at a West End hotel. During their marriage, her legal name became Hannah Prinsep; she occasionally used Anita Prinsep as her stage name. Her sister-in-law, by marriage, was the Canadian actress Margaret Bannerman. Prinsep went on to marry the actress Celia Glyn (born Cecilia Glynn Ouseley; 1906–1984), best known for her role in the crime film The House Opposite (1931).

Elson moved to California in 1935. There, in January 1955, she married her second husband, John Howland Paddock (b. 19 December 1892), an American retired mining engineer and former international polo player. Her legal name was Hannah Paddock. She occasionally used Anita Paddock as her stage name. Her husband died from a heart ailment in Newport Beach, California on 23 December 1963, aged 71.

Elson is the sitter in three portraits at the National Portrait Gallery. She was a close friend of the actor and comedian Leon Errol, whose manager of over 35 years was Elson's father. Errol and her father died within 24 hours of each other in October 1951.

=== Death ===
Elson died at her home in Newport Beach, California on 29 September 1985. She was 87. She was interred alongside her husband at Fairhaven Memorial Park in Santa Ana, California.
