= Prince's Theatre, Bristol =

Former theatre and cinema in Bristol, England

Coordinates: 51.4548°N 2.6018°W

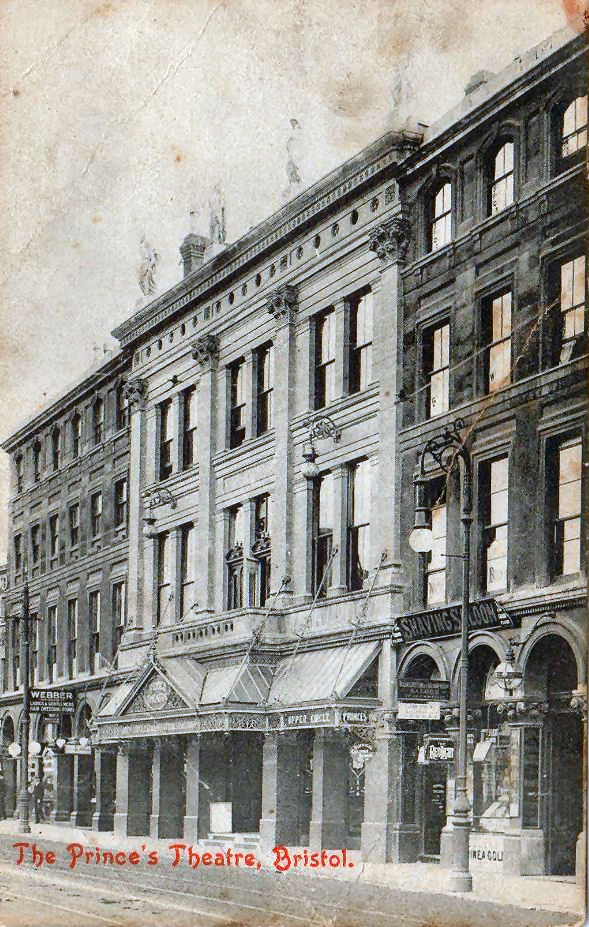
Prince's Theatre, Bristol in 1905

The Prince's Theatre was a theatre on Park Row in Bristol in England which was built in 1867 and was destroyed by bombing in 1940 in the Bristol Blitz during World War II. Owned by members of the Chute family for most of its existence, at one time the theatre was the Bristol venue for many of the country's leading touring actors and theatrical companies in addition to being one of the most renowned pantomime houses in the country before briefly becoming a music hall and latterly a cinema. The actors Henry Irving and Ellen Terry made their last appearance together under Irving's management at the Prince's Theatre in The Merchant of Venice in 1902.

== Opening ==
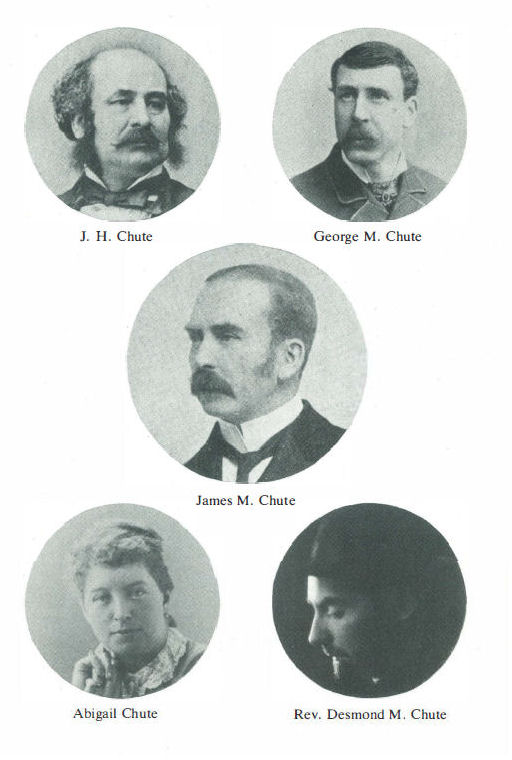
Portraits of the Chute Family of Bristol

The Prince's Theatre in Bristol was built in 1867 for James Henry Chute (1810-1878) who owned the Theatre Royal in Bristol. The theatre was constructed at a cost of about £20,000 on the site of the former home of the Baillie family known as “The Engineers House” to a design by theatre architect Charles J. Phipps, opening as the New Theatre Royal, Park Row on 14 October 1867 with a production of The Tempest. The theatre could seat 2,154 people with orchestra stalls, pit stalls for 800, dress circle balcony and gallery levels with 700 seats and eight private boxes. The pit was 64 feet wide, while the width of the stage including the scene docks was 107 feet. The height from the level of the stage to "the gridiron floor" was 59 feet. The behind the scenes machinery was state of the art for the time and used more than 24 miles of rope in its operation. Chute was married to Emily Mazzarine Macready (1825-1878), the half-sister of the famous tragedian William Macready, and their sons James Macready Chute (1856-1912) and George Macready Chute (1851-1888) would later to take over running the theatre along with their mother.

On opening night James Henry Chute stepped out before the act-drop to tell the audience about "the house that Jack built". He announced: "I want the first words uttered in this building to be words of welcome. Ladies and Gentlemen, I am most proud and happy to say you are heartily welcome". He then explained how the theatre had been built and introduced Phipps the architect and Davis the contractor and others connected with the construction of the theatre.

The Era reported of the theatre:

'The front elevation is handsome and imposing, and has been economised in a way which, without interfering with the general harmony and beauty of the design, will bring a considerable contribution to the income of the concern.... Owing to the peculiar conformation of the site, there will be no part of the building which is not above ground; whilst the entrance to the boxes throughout its entire course from street to seating will be uninterrupted by steps of any kin., The opening of the basement at all points upon the free air will be important, not merely on the score of economy of light, but because also it must contribute most materially to the all-important consideration - ventilation. Another marked feature of the plans is the great anxiety evinced to reduce the risks of fire to a minimum, and to provide ready egress from the interior in case of (whether needful or needless) alarm amongst the audience.'

Sadly, these safety measures were to prove ineffective.

== Tragedy at the theatre ==
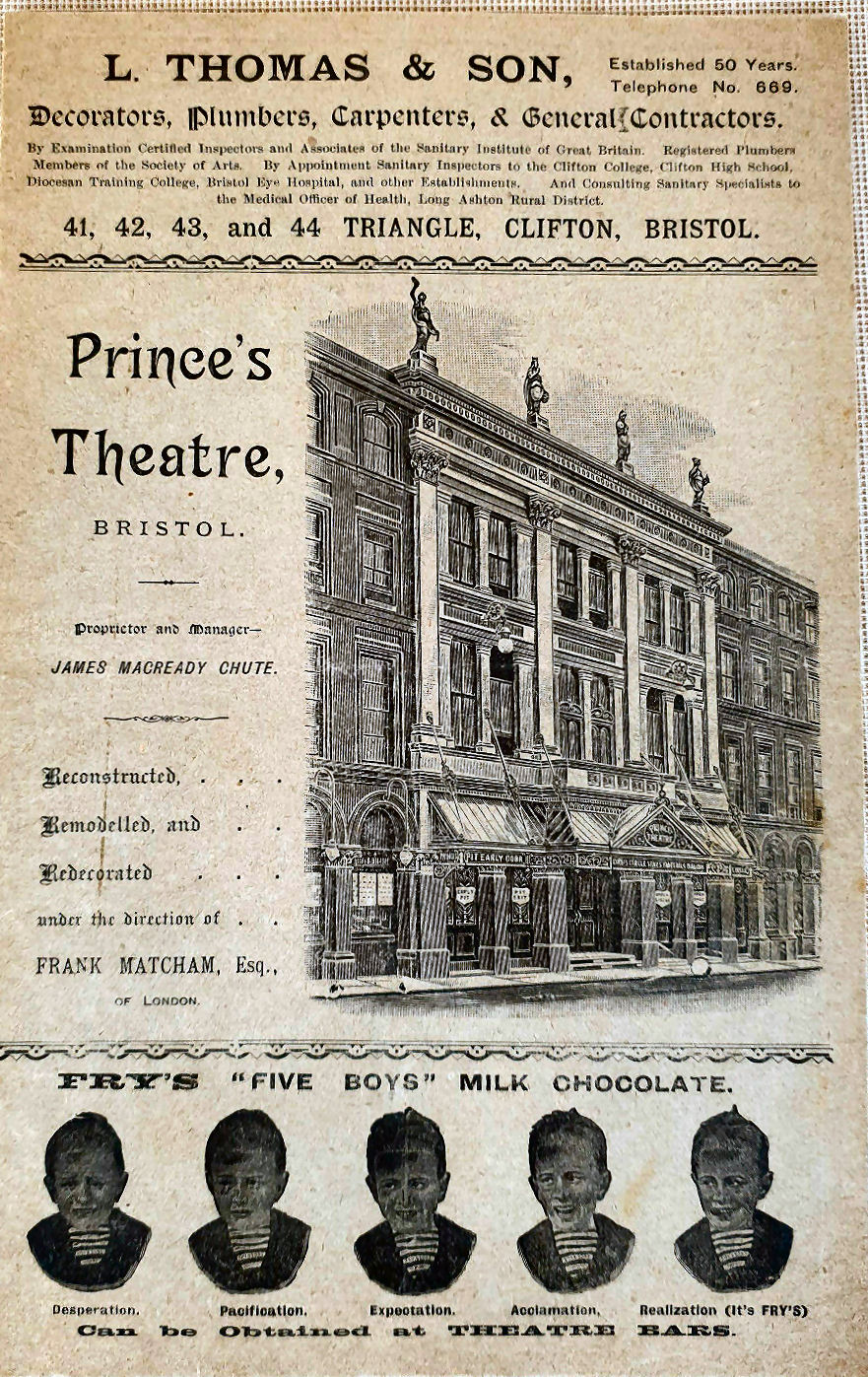
Programme for Frank Benson's production of Richard III (1904)

The theatre was built on a very steep slope and a queuing system had not yet been introduced to British theatres. Because of these factors disaster struck the theatre on 27 December 1869 when 18 people, mostly children, were killed in a crush as they tried to get into the theatre for a pantomime performance of Robinson Crusoe which had opened on the previous evening on Boxing Night. The Era in its edition of 2 January 1870 recorded:

'One of the most tragic and terrible catastrophes it has ever fallen to our lot to chronicle, and by which eighteen poor creatures were, at a few moments' warning, hurried into eternity, took place on Monday night at the New Theatre in Park-row. Mr Chute having issued an attractive programme, thousands flocked, as usual, to witness the performance... nearly 2,000 persons were endeavouring to gain admission either to the pit or gallery, the crowd extending some distance into the roadway.

Directly the doors were opened those behind pushed forward, heedless of the cries of those in front of them. Women and children were screaming for help, and even strong men seemed powerless to act. The tide behind was too strong to be resisted. Those behind called. "Forward!" but in vain those in front called "Back!" They might as well have appealed to the waves to stay their progress. The momentarily gathering crowd outside - ignorant, of course, of the imminent danger of those packed in the passage - pressed on with all their energy. Things at this juncture looked ugly enough, when a new alarm arose. Some one, desirous of restraining the impetuous advance of those behind, called out "Fire !" A panic was the result. Men, women, and children immediately made a frantic effort to drive back those coming in. In consequence of this movement a woman about fifty years of age fell down, and others fall upon her. The crowd began to sway backwards and forwards, and those who were down were trampled upon. The scene was now a most terrible one. Screams and moans rent the air. Cries for assistance were made in vain. People were pushed down and trampled under foot, and when once down it was almost impossible to recover their footing.

As soon as the crowd had to some extent cleared away a sad spectacle met the view. Bodies were lying about the passage in various spots. A boy named Charles Talbot, living at South Green street, Hotwell-road, was the first rescued, and he was found to be very seriously injured. Police-constable 95 took him to the shop of Mr Saunders, chemist, at the top of Park-street, who considered him in a dangerous condition, and at once advised his immediate removal to the infirmary. He was taken to that institution, but died soon after his admission. In the meantime other bodies were picked up, and sixty or seventy policemen were soon in attendance, and they at once drew a cordon round the entrance to the passage, thus preventing any one from getting admission. Meanwhile a number of bodies had been removed, and it was found that fourteen were quite dead. The bodies of all these were laid out in the lower refreshment-room of the Theatre, and no one except the representatives of the Press were permitted to see them. Eight persons whose condition appeared to be very precarious were taken instantly to the infirmary, where every attention was paid them. Three, however, did not yield to the treatment, and died after they had been only a short time in the institution.'

As those at the front fell those pushing forward from behind walked over them without realising it. Chute and his wife helped to lay out the bodies of those killed in the lower refreshment rooms. With great presence of mind Chute ordered the performance to continue to avoid a panic, and none of the audience knew of the evening's tragic events until they left after the performance. The tragedy was to take its toll on Chute emotionally and financially.

== Renaming ==
After the death of J. H. Chute in 1878 the theatre passed to his sons James Macready Chute and his brother George Macready Chute who on 4 August 1884 renamed the New Theatre Royal as the Prince's Theatre; this would be the theatre's name for the rest of its existence. The theatre closed for five weeks in June 1889 for redecoration while at the same time alterations to the upper circle were made to a design by the theatre architect Frank Matcham. The theatre reopened on 1 August 1889 with a production of As You Like It with Ellen Wallis as Rosalind and Frank Kemble-Cooper as Orlando. Electric lighting was added in 1895. Matcham made additional alterations to the theatre in 1902 which included reducing the seating capacity to 1,769 (stalls 57, dress circle 103, balcony 122, fauteils 137, upper circle and amphitheatre 300, pit 518, gallery 500, private boxes 32) and placed four classical statues representing Tragedy, Comedy, Music and Dance on top of the building. The theatre re-opened with Merrie England on Coronation Day, 1902. In 1907 a new ventilation system was fitted which made the Prince's one of the grandest and most comfortable of all the provincial venues.

== Pantomimes ==
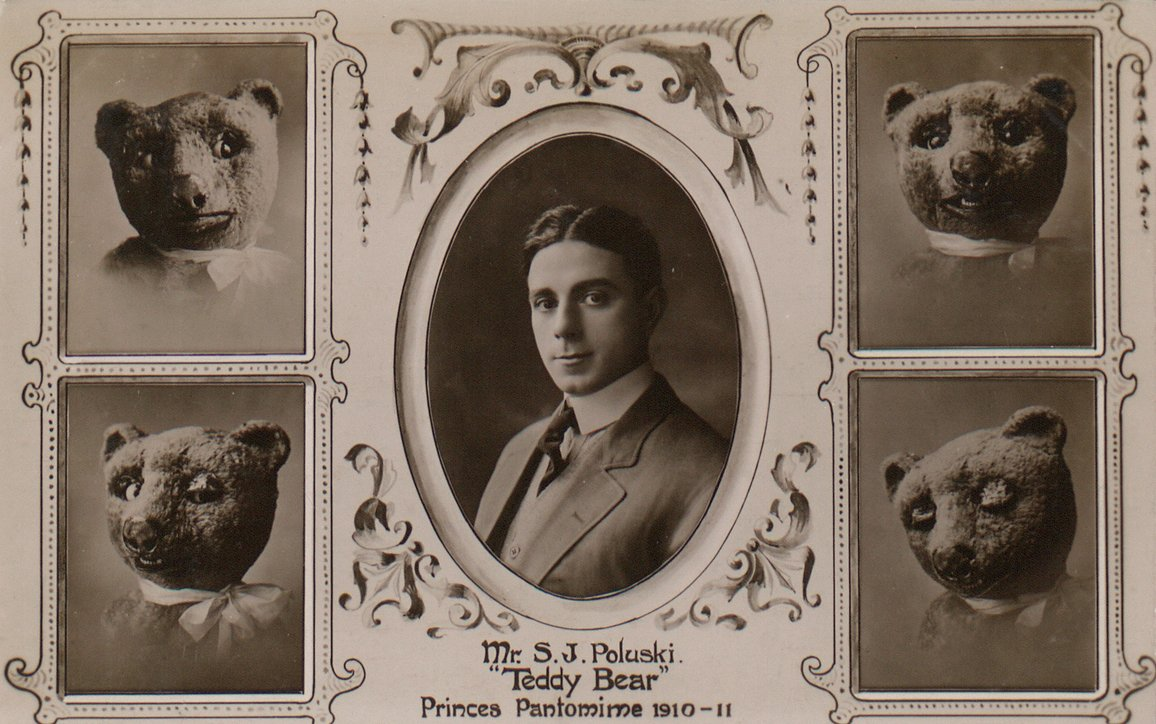
Sam Poluski of the Poluski Brothers as 'Teddy Bear' in the pantomime Jack Horner (1910)

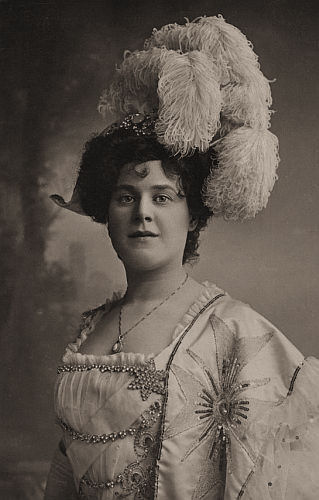
Lily Morris as Jack in Jack and Jill (1907)

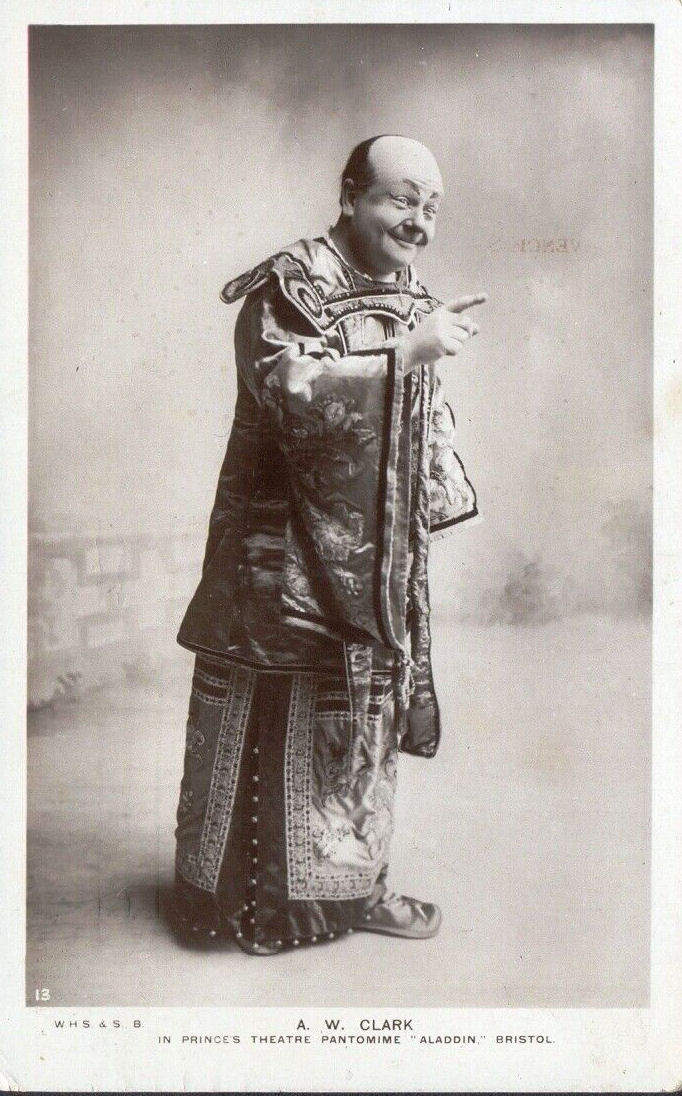
A. W. Clark in Aladdin (1908)

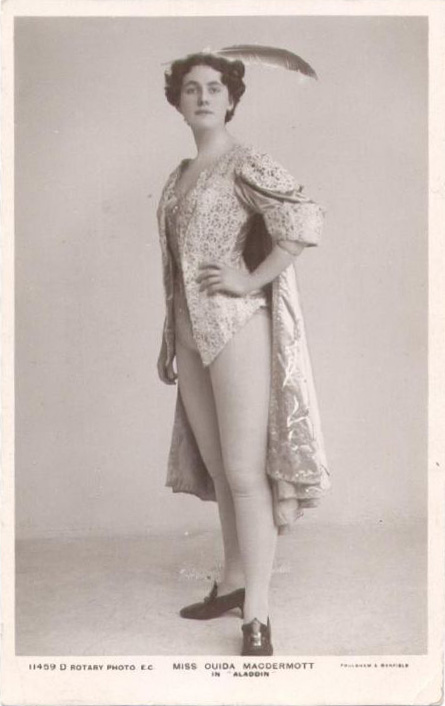
Ouida MacDermott in the title role in Aladdin (1908)

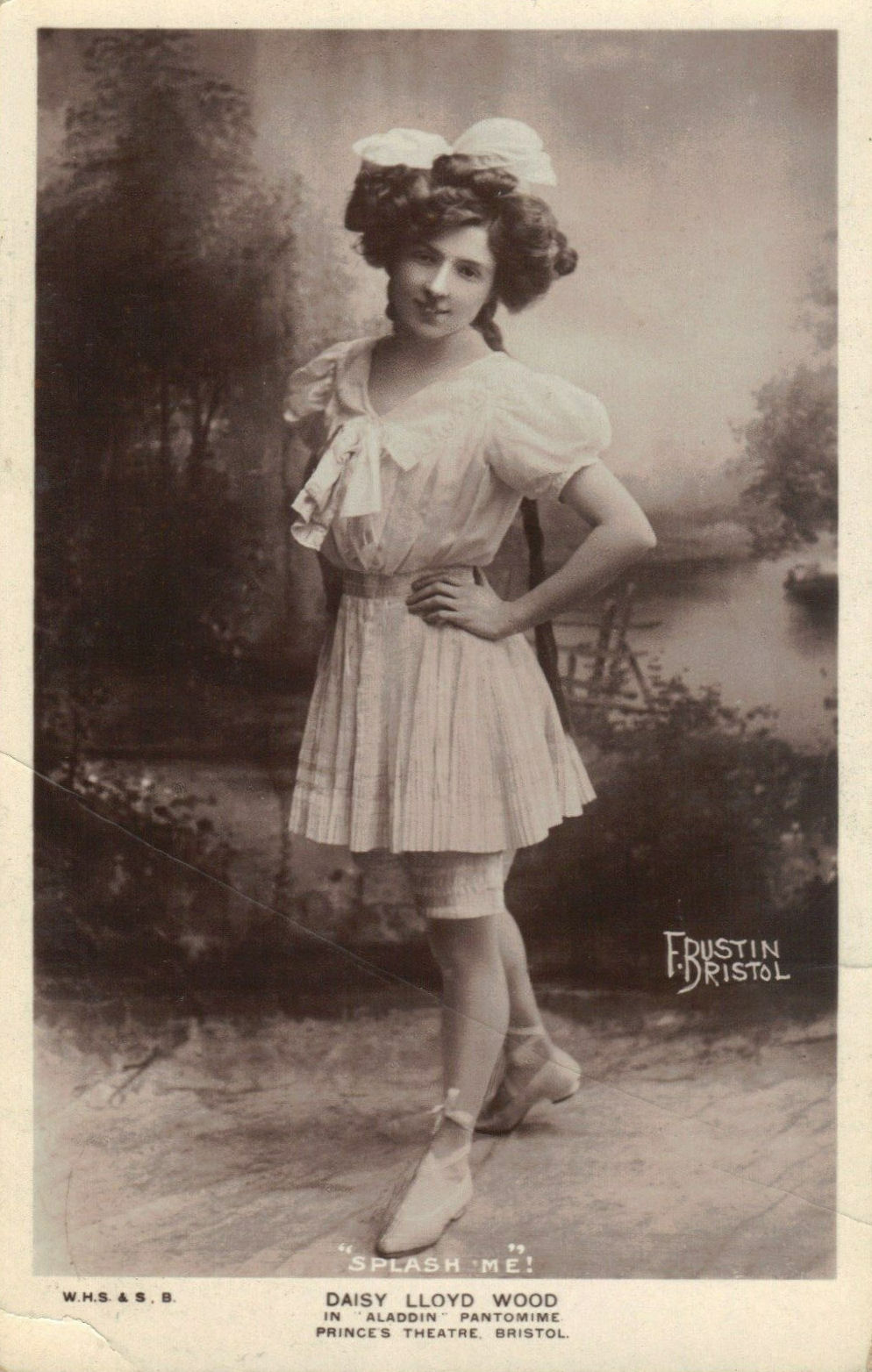
Daisy Wood in Aladdin (1908)

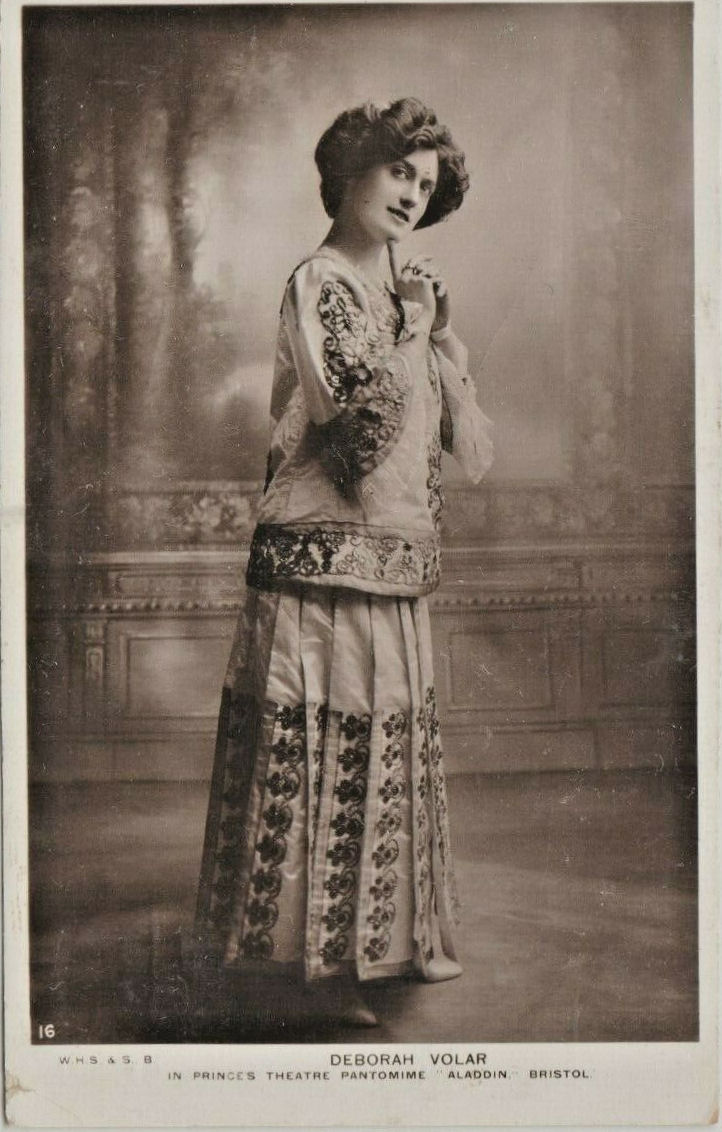
Deborah Volar in Aladdin (1908)

Horace Mills as the Dame in Jack and the Beanstalk (1911)

During the later Victorian era the Prince's Theatre produced a highly regarded annual pantomime starting with Aladdin in 1867 and continuing almost every Christmas season until 1940 with some of the leading performers of the period.

John Henry Chute kept overall control of the pantomimes held at the Prince's, beginning the planning in August of each year, with work commencing on the sets and costumes shortly after. Casting was ongoing with Chute travelling the country to watch about 30 other pantomimes in search of artistes and ideas. He employed leading writers in the genre and had a gift for spotting talented musical comedy artistes early in their careers including principal boys Ada Reeve, Florence Lloyd and Daisy Wood, the latter two being sisters of the famous Marie Lloyd. Among the dames the comedians Wilkie Bard and Horace Mills were popular with audiences, many of whom travelled from further afield on special trains arranged by Chute. The panto's ballet was rehearsed for three weeks before the opening night and the rest of the cast for two weeks. If the pantomime ran for too long when it opened at Christmas it was cut.

Pantomimes at the Prince's Theatre, Bristol - 1867 to 1939:

=== New Theatre Royal (1867–1884) ===
- 1867-68 – Aladdin
- 1868-69 – Field of the Cloth Of Gold
- 1869-70 – Robinson Crusoe – scene of the disaster that saw 18 killed
- 1870-71 – The Forty Thieves
- 1871-72 – Dick Whittington
- 1872-73 – Tom Thumb
- 1873-74 – Valentine and Orson
- 1874-75 – Red Riding Hood
- 1875-76 – Little Cinderella
- 1876-77 – Babes in the Wood
- 1877-78 – Beauty and the Beast
- 1878-79 – The House that Jack Built
- 1879-80 – Sinbad the Sailor
- 1880-81 – Jack and the Beanstalk
- 1881-82 – Aladdin
- 1882-83 – Dick Whittington
- 1883-84 – Cinderella

=== Prince's Theatre (1884–1939) ===
- 1884-85 – The Forty Thieves
- 1885-86 – Red Riding Hood
- 1886-87 – Sinbad the Sailor
- 1887-88 – Babes in the Wood
- 1888-89 – Robinson Crusoe
- 1889-90 – Sweet Cinderella
- 1890-91 – Aladdin
- 1891-92 – Dick Whittington
- 1892-93 – Babes in the Wood
- 1893-94 – The Naughty Forty Thieves – Marie Montrose
- 1894-95 – Little Bo-Peep
- 1895-96 – Cinderella – Frances Earle and Katie Barry
- 1896-97 – Robinson Crusoe
- 1897-98 – Red Riding Hood
- 1898-99 – Sinbad the Sailor
- 1899-1900 – Aladdin - Ada Reeve
- 1900-01 – Dick Whittington
- 1901-02 – Babes in the Wood
- 1902-03 – Cinderella
- 1903-04 – Puss in Boots
- 1904-05 – The Sleeping Beauty
- 1905-06 – Mother Goose – Lily Morris and Wilkie Bard
- 1906-07 – Humpty Dumpty – Horace Mills as the Dame
- 1907-08 – Jack and Jill – Lily Morris and 'Nipper' Lane
- 1908-09 – Aladdin – Bransby Williams, Daisy Wood and Ouida MacDermott
- 1909-10 – Mother Hubbard – G. H. Elliott, Fred Conquest and Lulu Valli
- 1910-11 – Jack Horner – Ernie Mayne and Albert le Fre
- 1911-12 – Jack and the Beanstalk– Daisy Wood and Horace Mills
- 1912-13 – Dick Whittington – Winifred Ward and Tom Conway
- 1913-14 – Robinson Crusoe – Nellie Taylor and W. H. Rawlins
- 1914-15 – Humpty Dumpty – Dorothy Ward and Shaun Glenville
- 1915-16 – Goody Two Shoes – Lupino Lane, Horace Mills and Sybil Arundale
- 1916-17 – Cinderella – Jack Pleasants and Dolly Harmer
- 1917-18 – Old King Cole – George Miller and Beatrice Allen
- 1918-19 – Sinbad – Daisy Wood and Albert le Fre
- 1919-20 – Mother Goose – Fred Wright and Fred Conquest
- 1920-21 – Tom Tom the Piper's Son – Hal Bert and Violet Vernon
- 1921-22 – Aladdin – Horace Mills and Elsie May
- 1922-23 – Jack and Jill – Dan Leno Jr. and Barry Lupino
- 1923-24 – King of the Golden Mountain – Marriott Edgar and Hilda Newsome
- 1924-25 – Goldilocks and the Three Bears – Horace Mills and Johnny Schofield Jr.
- 1925-26 – Robinson Crusoe – Arnold Richardson and Teddy Brogden
- 1926-27 – The Forty Thieves – Marriott Edgar and Sylvia Cecil
- 1927-28 – Humpty Dumpty – Mona Vivian and Johnny Schofield Jr.
- 1928-29 – Hop O'My Thumb – Ivor Vinter, George Lacy and Kathie Lyn
- 1929-30 – The Queen of Hearts – Clarkson Rose, Olive Fox and Eileen Fowler
- 1930-31 – Goody Two Shoes – Betty Warren and Cecile Maule-Cole
- 1931-32 – Cinderella – Dick Tubb, Violet Field and Percy le Fre
- 1932-33 – Robinson Crusoe – Mona Vivian and Barry Lupino
- 1933-34 – Mother Goose – Walter Amner, Audrey Ball and Victor Eynsford
- 1934-35 – Dick Whittington – Hart Athol, Mamie Holland and Wilbur Lenton
- 1935-36 – Babes in the Wood
- 1936-37 – Aladdin – Jean Colin and Leslie Strange
- 1937-38 – Cinderella – George Baines, Peggy Bedell and Joan Cole
- 1938-39 – Jack and the Beanstalk – Norman Evans, Jack Barty and Jean Colin
- 1939-40 – Red Riding Hood – Jean Colin and Bunny Doyle
- 1940 – Humpty Dumpty - the pantomime did not go ahead

== Productions ==
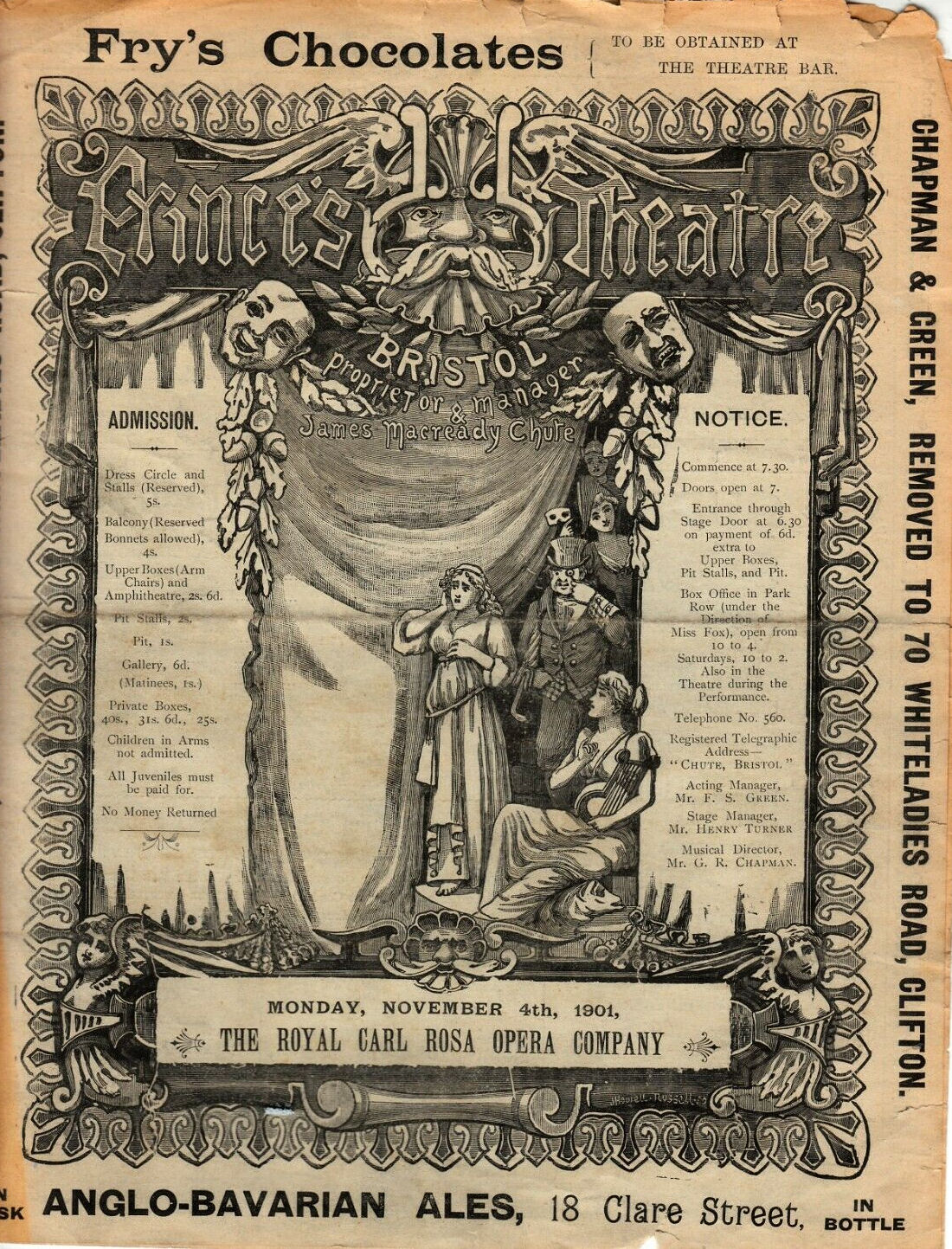
Programme for Faust by the Carl Rosa Opera Company (1901)

Touring actors who appeared at the Prince's included: J. L. Toole and Lillie Langtry, Ada Ferrar, Charles Wyndham and George Alexander, Sarah Bernhardt, Julia Neilson Terry, Pavlova, Ellaline Terriss and Gabrielle Ray, while Clara Butt sang from the stage in 1897.

Other actors and touring productions at the theatre included: Dorothy (1890); Haddon Hall (1892); A Woman of No Importance (1893); The Lady Slavey (1893-1894); Amy Augarde and Edmund Payne in Faust up to Date (1890); The Belle of New York (1898) and The Belle of Mayfair (1906); Adrienne Augarde and Amy Augarde in Floradora (1900); Frank Benson and his company; Leedham Bantock, Horace Mills and Richard Temple in George Edwardes' production of San Toy (1900); Henry Irving in The Bells (1891), Louis XI (1893), with Ellen Terry in The Merchant of Venice (1902), Faust (1894) and the premiere of Waterloo (1894) by Arthur Conan Doyle; the D'Oyly Carte Opera Company and the Carl Rosa Opera Company; The Earl and the Girl (1904); John Martin-Harvey in A Cigarette Maker’s Romance, The Only Way, The Breed of the Treshams, Hamlet (1903-1904), and Eugene Aram (1905-1906); Zena Dare in the title role in Peter Pan (1906); Herbert Beerbohm Tree in Trilby (1907); Marie Studholme in Miss Hook of Holland (1909); A Greek Slave (1910); Seymour Hicks and Ellaline Terriss in the play Broadway Jones (1913); Yvonne Arnaud in Plan For A Hostess (1939); Fay Compton, Victoria Hopper and Noel Howlett in The Drawing Room (1939); Diana Wynyard, Anton Walbrook and Rex Harrison in Design for Living (1939); John Geilgud, Edith Evans, Gwen Ffrangcon-Davies, Peggy Ashcroft, Jack Hawkins and Margaret Rutherford in The Importance of Being Earnest (1939); Phyllis Dare and Zena Dare in Ivor Novello's Full House (1940); Johnston Forbes-Robertson and company; and Robert Donat, Roger Livesey and Erik Chitty in The Devil's Disciple (1940).

== Later years ==
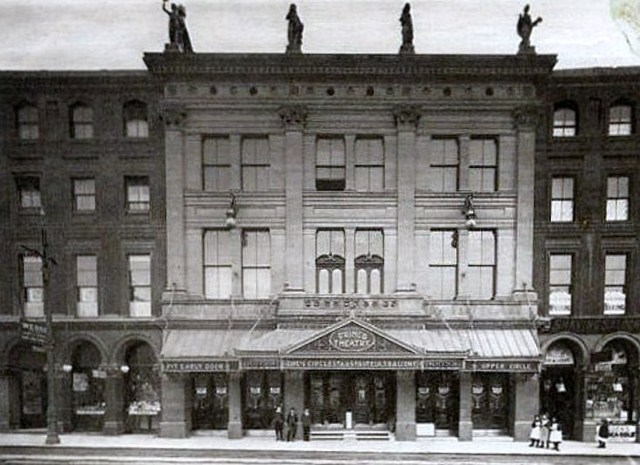
The theatre's frontage

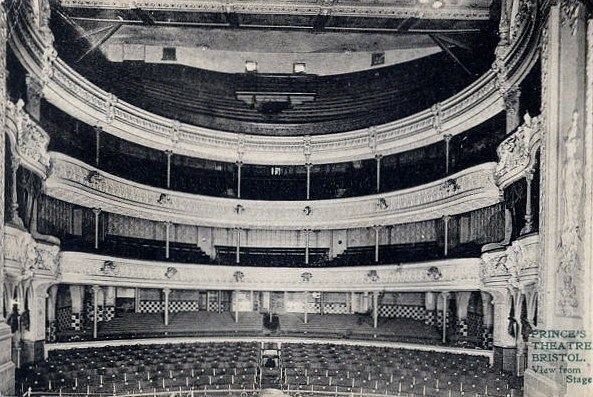
The auditorium from the stage

On 18 February 1888 during the last performance of the pantomime Babes In The Wood the show was interrupted by the behaviour of a group of students and others who threw squibs on to the stage, dried peas at the actresses and who argued loudly with the manager. In 1896 the pantomime was followed by a short Harlequinade and then by a showing of early films. In 1912 'Jimmy' Chute died and the Prince's became a limited company with the theatre being managed by Abigail Philomena Chute (née Henessy, 1855-1931), his widow, together with her co-director, John Hart. The finances needed to mount 'in house' productions became increasingly difficult to raise and the Prince's became reliant on touring productions and its annual pantomimes in order to survive. In addition, the growth of cinema as a popular leisure activity caused serious competition to the Prince's. In February 1913 the Prince's Theatre was converted into a full-time cinema but by 1915 it had reverted to live theatre.

After Abigail Chute died in 1931 John Hart continued to run the theatre until 1936. Abigail's son, Desmond Macready Chute, had become a Roman Catholic priest by this time and was living in Rapallo in Italy and so had no interest in taking over the management of the theatre, which passed to Tommy Hicksons. For a period from 1935 he was forced to rebrand the Prince's as a variety house and music hall, but the subsequent loss of income resulted in the theatre not getting its badly needed refurbishment and redecoration. Eventually the Prince's reverted to a venue for touring theatrical companies for the last few years of its existence.

The Prince's Theatre, which had been a popular touring venue for many years for companies from the West End of London was destroyed in the Bristol Blitz during World War II together with the Coliseum Theatre opposite it when they were both hit by bombs on 24 November 1940. Initially, there were plans to rebuild the theatre but the site was sold in 1954 and flats, named Irving House and Terry House after actors Sir Henry Irving and Dame Ellen Terry, who had played at the Prince's Theatre, were built on the site instead.
