= Widow Twankey =

Character in the pantomime Aladdin

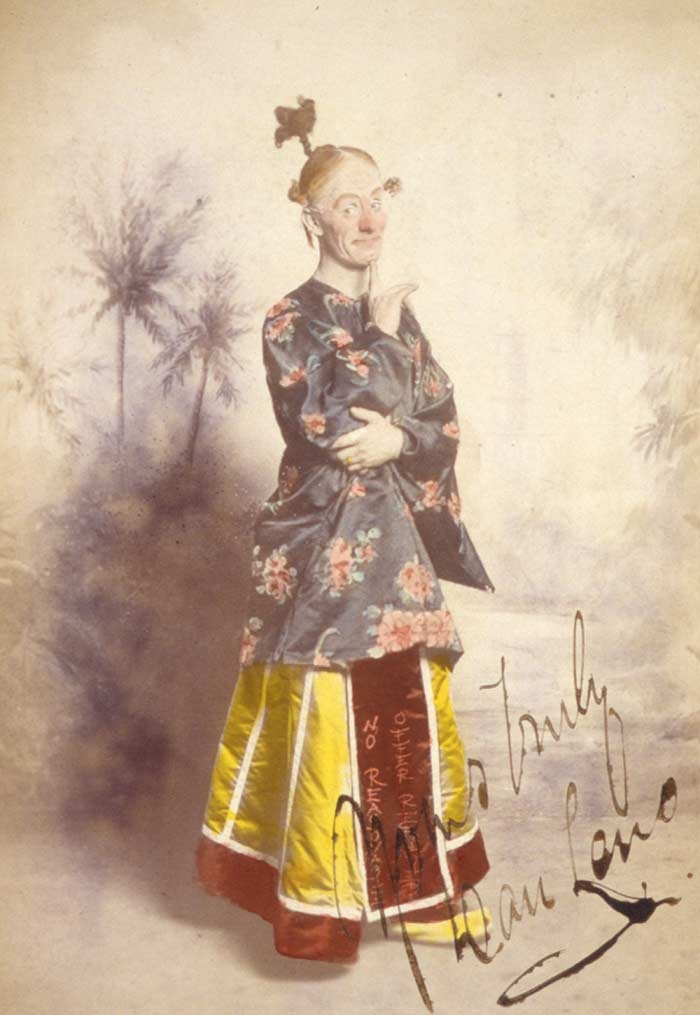
Dan Leno in the role of Widow Twankey, for an 1896 performance at the Theatre Royal, Drury Lane

Widow Twankey (originally Twankay, sometimes Twanky) is a female character in the pantomime Aladdin. She is a pantomime dame, played by an older man.

== History ==
The story of Aladdin is drawn from the Arabian Nights, a collection of Middle-Eastern fables. It was first published in England between 1704 and 1714; and this story was dramatised in 1788 by John O'Keefe for Covent Garden as a harlequinade and included the character of 'Aladdin's Mother' (but unnamed) played by Mrs Davett. She was the widow of a tailor (as in the original story) and this was the profession in many later versions. In 1813, she had the same profession but was the Widow Ching Mustapha, and again in 1836, played by Eva Marie Veigel (Mrs Garrick), but the character was not yet comic nor played by a man.

In 1844 a burlesque version of the story described Widow Mustapha as 'a washerwoman with mangled feelings'. However, in productions of the same year and most others up to 1891 she is involved with tailoring, with rare excursions to a newspaper shop and fishmonger. The laundry was already established as a place for a clown performance on the stage and began to be worked in, notably with Dan Leno as Twankay along with Aladdin's brother Washee-Washee in 1896. The name later changed to Wishy-Washy.

The name Twankay appears first in 1861 in a play by Henry James Byron called Aladdin or the Wonderful Scamp, (a parodic name of an earlier opera) which established much of the content and style of the modern pantomime. It was performed by James Rogers who had previously played the female role Clorinda in a version of Cinderella. It was named after a cheap brand of China tea. Twankay, or 'twankey' is an inferior grade of green tea, with an old, ragged, open leaf – the implication is that the widow is 'past her best' – with the name Twankay deriving from Tunxi in Anhui, from where the tea in China originates. Occasionally, the spelling of her name in the programme (but not the pronunciation on the stage) is varied to make it look more like a "Chinese" personal name – e.g., "Tuang Kee Chung" in a 1979 musical version.

The character has had a number of different names including Ching Ching, Wee Ping, Chow Chow, and Tan King.

== Some notable people who have played Widow Twankey ==
(many have played it more than once)

- Wilkie Bard 1909 Theatre Royal, Drury Lane
- Desmond Barrit 1999 Theatre Royal, Norwich
- Christopher Biggins 2005 Richmond Theatre
- Frank Birch 1932 Hammersmith Theatre
- Peter Butterworth 1979 Coventry Theatre
- Wyn Calvin 1999 Croydon
- Herbert Campbell 1885 Theatre Royal, Drury Lane
- Les Dawson 1981 Richmond Theatre
- Willie Edouin 1888 Royal Strand Theatre
- Julie Goodyear 1998 Royal Court Theatre, Liverpool
- Barry Howard 1999 Swansea Grand Theatre
- George Honey 1863 Royal Strand Theatre
- John Inman 1991 Churchill Theatre Bromley
- Nat Jackley 1951 London Casino
- Danny LaRue 1978 London Palladium
- Dan Leno 1896 Theatre Royal, Drury Lane
- Ian McKellen 2004 Old Vic
- Don Maclean 2002 Birmingham Hippodrome
- Ivan Menzies 1934 Prince Edward Theatre
- Horace Mills 1900 Prince's Theatre, Manchester
- Harry Nicholls 1885 Royal Strand Theatre
- Eric Potts 2007 Milton Keynes Theatre
- Arthur Riscoe 1937 Adelphi Theatre
- Clive Rowe 2009 Hackney Empire
- Terry Scott 1970 London Palladium
- Ronald Shiner 1959 Coliseum Theatre
- Kenneth Alan Taylor 2008 Nottingham Playhouse
- Jack Tripp 1985 Bristol Hippodrome
- Nellie Wallace 1930 Dominion Theatre

== Widow Twanky in other media ==
Hercules: The Legendary Journeys, a U.S./New Zealand fantasy-adventure-comedy television program, added Widow Twanky to its supporting cast in 1997. The role was played by Michael Hurst, who also played the regular character Iolaus and the recurring character Charon. On at least one occasion, Hurst-as-Twanky was credited as "Edith Sidebottom.
