= George Formby Sr =

English comedian and singer (1875–1921)

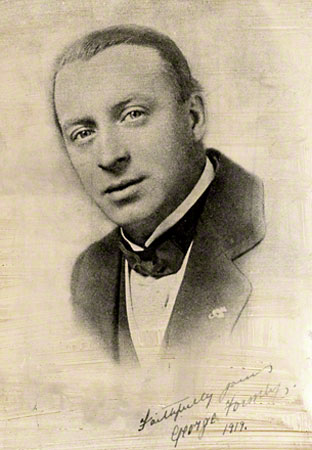
Formby in 1919

George Formby (born James Lawler Booth; 4 October 1875 – 8 February 1921) was an English comedian and singer in musical theatre, known as one of the greatest music hall performers of the early 20th century. His comedy played upon Lancashire stereotypes, and he was popular around Britain. His nickname, "The Wigan Nightingale", was coined because of the way he would use his bronchial cough as a comedic device in his act.

Formby was born into poverty in the industrial North West England; his mother was an alcoholic and part-time prostitute, and during much of his youth he was maltreated. To earn money he would sing for pennies on street corners, before he joined a singing duo in his teens. He began to develop his own act during the 1890s and built up a following in Lancashire. He also developed a series of stage characters, including that of "John Willie", which is described by the cultural historian Jeffrey Richards as "the archetypal gormless Lancashire lad ... hen-pecked, accident-prone, but muddling through." Formby also had a successful recording career and made the transition from music hall to revue in 1916.

His health had always been poor, but a stage accident in 1916 weakened Formby's lungs, and he suffered increasingly for the next few years, reducing his ability to perform. Tuberculosis and influenza—the latter contracted in the pandemic of 1918—weakened his constitution further, and he died of pulmonary tuberculosis in 1921 at the age of 45. Formby's act, and one of his costumes and canes, inspired Charlie Chaplin in the formation of his character the Tramp. Formby's son also used parts of his father's act when starting his stage career and, once established, also changed his name to George Formby; Formby Jr went on to become the top British male star in box office takings between 1937 and 1943.

== Biography ==
=== Early years: 1875–90 ===
"Mine is not an isolated story of the stage. Which of the 'bhoys', I wonder, can say they never knew days of privation and distress? But which of them, I wonder, can tell a more pathetic story than I?"

— Formby on his childhood

George Formby was born James Lawler Booth in Ashton-under-Lyne, Lancashire, on 4 October 1875. He was the illegitimate and only child of Sarah Jane Booth (c. 1856–1912), a poor, illiterate cotton weaver. His father, Francis Lawler, a coal miner, was not named on the birth certificate; six months after the birth of their son, the couple married, both aged about 19. Sarah worked as a prostitute; she was small, around 4 feet (1.2 m) tall, and sang in pubs in exchange for alcoholic drinks. She was convicted 140 times for offences that included theft, prostitution, drunkenness and brawling. The marriage was turbulent, and Formby was often neglected, mistreated and suffered malnourishment. Because Sarah was frequently absent from home, and often detained overnight at the local police station, Formby was regularly forced to sleep outside. As a result he developed asthma and became susceptible to bronchitis. (Note: Formby was not alone in developing a chest complaint: the mortality rate from bronchitis was 20% higher in the north west than the rest of the country.) In his later years he recalled that his "childhood was the most miserable as ever fell to the lot of a human creature".

Formby left formal education at the age of eight or nine, and did not learn to read until well into his teenage years. (Note: Details—including dates—for Formby's activities are scant: his biographers, Sue Smart and Richard Bothway Howard, write that "little is known about the period between 1884 and 1892"; many of the stories Formby related later in life are contradicted by extant records. One of Formby's claims was that he ran away from home when he was seven and worked in a steel foundry near Wigan. Official census records, however, show that in 1891 he was still living with his mother, his father having died the previous year.) To earn money for the household, he sang on street corners for coppers; the family's poverty worsened when, in October 1890, Lawler died from pulmonary tuberculosis at the age of 33. Formby secured a job at a cotton mill and spent two years as a loom builder. He supplemented his wages by singing in pubs, alehouses and free-and-easies, the last being places where informal arrangements were made for patrons to provide their own entertainment. Around this time he joined up with another boy to form an act, "the Glenray Brothers" (also "the Glen Ray Brothers"), which was profitable enough to have a manager; the act continued until Formby's boy soprano voice broke, after which the pair separated.

=== Burgeoning stage career: 1890–1902 ===
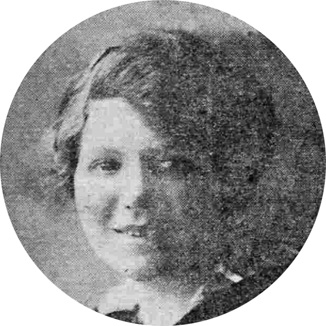
Formby's second wife Eliza Ann, née Hoy (c. 1879–1981), whom he bigamously married

Formby began to develop his own stage act during the 1890s, and built a large fan base in Lancashire. He devised several characters with their own costumes, and composed a series of comic songs. By 1896 his assignment book records that he was buying and collecting comic songs and securing the singing rights. He was billed as J.H. Booth until 1897, when he changed his stage name to George Formby. Although rumoured to have picked his new surname after seeing it as a destination on a railway carriage, the main sources agree this story is likely to be apocryphal. (Note: Those main sources are the biographies of Formby's son, George: David Bret, who published George Formby: A Troubled Genius in 1999; and Sue Smart and Richard Bothway Howard who, in 2011, wrote It's Turned Out Nice Again!.) The origin of the Formby name is more likely to have been a suggestion from Dennis Clarke, the manager of the Argyle Theatre in Birkenhead, while George was chosen in honour of the music hall star George Robey. Formby first used his new stage name in Birkenhead in 1897.

One of the earliest characters Formby developed was "John Willie". Baz Kershaw, the professor of theatre, described the character as Formby's "onstage alter ego", while the cultural historian Jeffrey Richards describes Willie as "the archetypal gormless Lancashire lad in baggy trousers, tight jacket, and bowler hat, slow-talking, hen-pecked, accident-prone, but muddling through." His costume included ill-fitting clothes, large boots worn on the wrong feet, and a variety of hats; he would often carry a cane. In 1908 he lent one of his costumes to a young Charlie Chaplin when the latter was touring with Fred Karno's troupe; Chaplin also incorporated Formby's cane twirl and duck-like walk into his act.

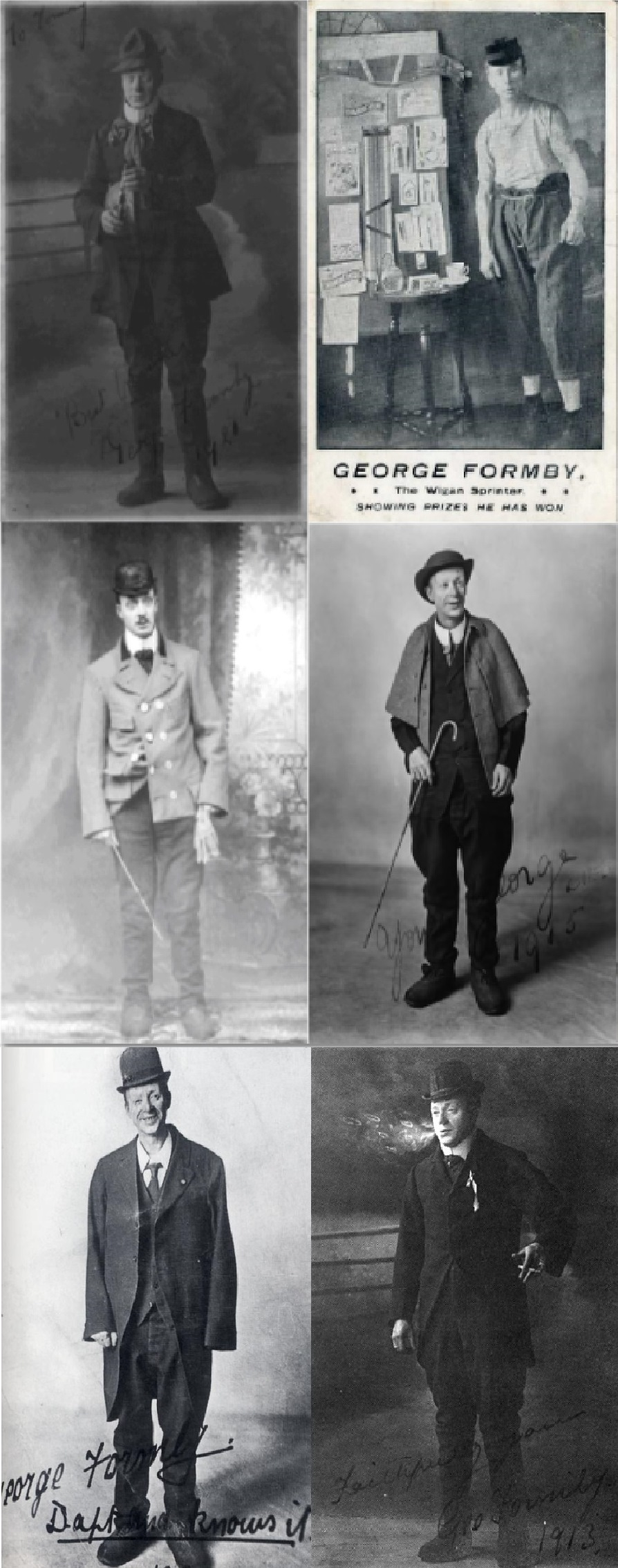
Formby in examples of his costumes

In 1897 Formby met Martha Maria Salter, a 20-year-old music hall performer, and they married in her home town of Halifax in August. Little is known about Salter, although the 1901 census shows that she was still living with her parents. The marriage does not appear to have been successful, but according to Formby's biographers, Sue Smart and Richard Bothway Howard, there is no evidence of a divorce between the couple and no information relating to when the couple separated.

In 1897 or 1898 Formby was signed to appear at the Lyceum Theatre, Blackburn, supporting the magician Walford Bodie; a 40-week tour followed, with Formby earning 30 shillings a week. In 1898, while performing at the Wigan Empire as part of the tour, Formby met Eliza Hoy, the daughter of the Empire's cashier. (Note: Sources disagree on Eliza's age. Bret states she was 21; Smart and Bothway Howard put her at 19. The Formby memorial, including her grave, states that she "Died July 1981, Aged 102 Years".) The couple married in August the following year at Wigan Registry Office, although this marriage was bigamous because of his union two years previously with Salter. In the months after their marriage, Eliza persuaded Formby to join the Roman Catholic Church, which helped her parents overcome their initial distrust of him. Formby and Eliza had thirteen children, of whom seven survived: four daughters and three sons. The cultural historian David Bret states that Formby was "possessed of staggering consumptive virility", as the comedian also had several children with other partners. Eliza became an important figure in Formby's professional life, making his costumes and standing in the wings during his performances to help him. Eliza also continued working as a seamstress and would sell chips during lunchtimes to supplement the family's income.

=== London, and a growing reputation: 1902–16 ===
In 1902 Formby performed for the first time in London, when he was booked by Ted Granville, the proprietor of the Royal Albert Music Hall in Canning Town, to appear for £3 a week; (Note: The £3 weekly salary in 1902 is approximately £284 in 2014.) Granville subsequently became Formby's London agent. Eliza Formby later recounted that Belle Elmore, the wife (and later victim) of the murderer Dr Crippen, saw Formby perform, and was so impressed that she contacted Granville and told him to travel to Leeds to see the act. Formby soon transferred to the London Pavilion music hall, where he was immediately successful, and became "an idol of the town", according to The Times. His popularity increased when Marie Lloyd, the influential music hall singer and actress, said that she would only watch two acts: his and Dan Leno's. Lloyd recommended Formby to the proprietor of the Tivoli Music Hall, who gave the comedian a ten-week run. Robey was also impressed, and in 1905 he recommended Formby as the lead in a pantomime in Newcastle at a salary of £35 a week. He was able to command £325 a week by 1920. (Note: Formby's weekly salary of £35 in 1906 is approximately £3,000 in 2014; the £325 weekly salary in 1920 is approximately £15,000.)

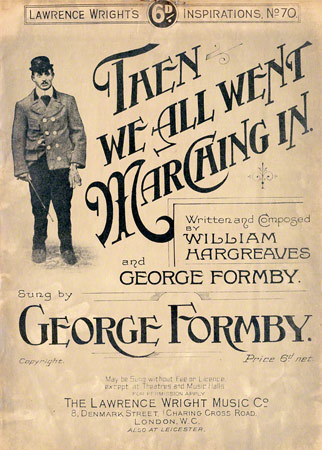
Sheet music for "We All Went Marching In", 1913

After the Formbys had lost three daughters to early deaths, their first son, George Hoy Booth, was born in 1904. Although the boy was born unable to see owing to an obstructive caul, he gained his sight during a violent coughing fit or sneeze when he was a few months old. Over the course of 1904 Formby purchased the singing rights to 57 songs, more than his normal annual number of between 10 and 20; the average cost of his songs was around a guinea. (Note: A guinea for a song equated to approximately £100 in 2014.) Two years later he made his first recordings, on phonograph cylinders, for the Louis Sterling Cylinder Company, and in 1907 he signed a recording contract with Zonophone. He was one of the few performers who had no difficulties recording clearly with the primitive equipment, and he performed in a relaxed fashion for an invisible audience. He would sing his song and then talk to the listener using a variant of his normal stage patter. Some of those songs, such as "Playing the Game out West" and "Since I Parted my Hair in the Middle" have been identified by Dave Russell, the social historian, as "clever depictions of a provincial innocent let lose [sic] in the capital".

For much of January and February 1908 Formby appeared in various London music halls for which he received £20 a week. The following year, and staying in the capital, he played three halls a night in exchange for £45 a week. One such venue was the Tivoli with Lloyd and Little Tich as the headline acts. When not performing in London, Formby continued to tour the provincial music halls. In 1910 he again appeared at the Tivoli, and was reviewed in The Times, in which the reporter opined that Formby "becomes more of an artist the longer he sings". Later that year Formby recorded what would become his most famous song, "Standing at the Corner of the Street", which he also co-wrote. By 1913 his record sales were strong enough for him to negotiate a new recording contract worth £300 a year. (Note: £300 is approximately £25,000 in 2014.)

Formby's career received a further boost in July 1913 when he was one of seven acts to appear before George V and Queen Mary in a Royal Command Performance at Knowsley Hall, near Liverpool. The Times reported that Formby's "broad humour succeeded with unexpected ease, and their Majesties praised him very highly after the performance." Formby was embarrassed by his performance. His usual act partly consisted of a running patter with the orchestra conductor, which he again did on this occasion; behind the conductor sat the royal party, and it looked to some that Formby was speaking disrespectfully to them. The king understood to whom Formby was talking, however, and afterwards presented him with a tiepin. In October Formby appeared in his second Royal Command Performance of the year, in a charity show organised by the French actress Sarah Bernhardt. He took part in two acts: a performance of "Ten Little Nigger Boys All in a Row", alongside other music hall entertainers including Robey, Mark Sheridan, Cicely Courtneidge and George Graves, followed by a short solo piece.

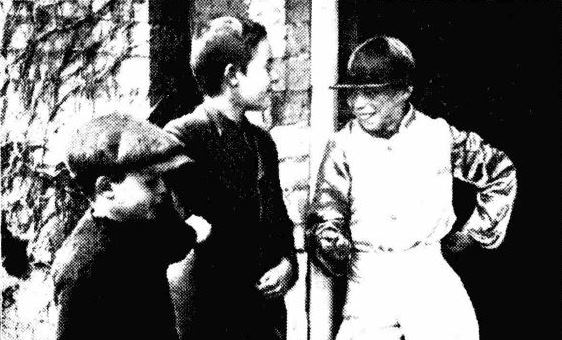
Formby Jr (right) while employed as a jockey, aged 10, in 1915

In March 1914 Formby appeared in No Fool Like an Old Fool, a 20-minute-long silent comedy film, which is thought to be lost; it was his only film appearance, and little is known about the plot or his character. (Note: Although he was keen to undertake further film work a later project never transpired.) When the First World War broke out in August that year, he tried to enlist, but was turned down on medical grounds; instead he, like many music hall stars, was active in the recruiting campaign for the army and spoke at rallies, particularly on behalf of the Derby Scheme.

Formby was always worried that his son George would watch him on stage, as he did not wish the boy to become a comic, saying "one fool in the family is enough". Nevertheless, although he had sent George away to train as a jockey, in 1915 he allowed his son to appear on screen, taking the lead part of a stable boy in By the Shortest of Heads, a thriller directed by Bert Haldane. (Note: Formby Jr played a stable boy who outwits a gang of villains and wins a £10,000 prize when he comes first in a horse race. The film is now considered lost, with the last-known copy having been destroyed in 1940.) After the filming, Formby sent his son to Ireland, to continue his jockey training, and also sent the five horses Formby had purchased that year, which joined others he had previously bought.

=== Worsening health, and death: 1916–21 ===
Formby was injured in June 1916 during rehearsals for the revue Razzle-Dazzle, after a stage collapsed onto him at the Theatre Royal, Drury Lane. He suffered lung damage and was treated for a pulmonary haemorrhage at Guy's Hospital before recovering. Although he was the lead in the show, the premiere took place without him; it was criticised by reviewers, and The Observer thought that "some of it seemed to have strayed in by mistake out of a second-rate provincial pantomime". Formby returned within a week and the reviews were more positive, with The Observer stating that it was "one of the successes of the season ... Razzle-Dazzle is now one of the liveliest revues in London, and the most spectacular". (Note: In July Formby also appeared for a week at the Victoria Palace Theatre during the run of Razzle-Dazzle, after the impresario Alfred Butt refused to release him from a long-standing booking.) By August the production had transferred to the Empire Theatre, Leicester Square.

Formby, c. 1921

The damage to Formby's lungs from the accident was exacerbated by tuberculosis, and he began to miss an increasing number of his appearances. In 1917 the Southport Palladium took court action against him for failing to fulfil a theatrical engagement as contracted, whereupon his lawyer said that Formby was dying of the lung disease and was working for the short time he had left for the benefit of his large family. Formby lost the case: his plea of ill-health was compromised by his accepting an engagement elsewhere at the same time.

Formby's health was further damaged in the influenza pandemic of 1918, during which he contracted the disease while appearing at the Manchester Hippodrome and was unable to work for a month. He was taken ill during the runs of pantomimes in both 1918 and 1919, was forced to rest for three months in 1919, and collapsed on stage during a performance in Newcastle upon Tyne in the 1920–21 pantomime season. Formby was advised by doctors to emigrate to South Africa for the benefit of his health, but he preferred to stay in Britain, with his wife and children, and continued to work. During his performances his wife would wait in the wings with ice for him to suck to stop internal bleeding, and an oxygen tent was present in the stage wings ready for emergencies.

In early 1921 Formby was appearing at the Newcastle Empire in Jack and Jill when he collapsed after a show. He returned to his home near Warrington, where he died of pulmonary tuberculosis on 8 February, at the age of 45. He was buried in a family plot in the Catholic section of Warrington Cemetery. He left over £25,000 in his will, (Note: £25,000 is approximately £965,000 in 2014.) listing Eliza as executrix. As their marriage had been bigamous, he described her as "my reputed wife Eliza Ann Booth, otherwise Eliza Ann Hoy".

The obituarist for The Manchester Guardian wrote that Formby was one of the "great drolls" of the music hall whose humour "always seemed to take its rise in a sympathetic perception of human vanities and weaknesses". The Dundee Courier considered him a great comedian, made all the greater by his continuing to perform through his illness, while the drama critic J. T. Grein, writing in The Illustrated London News, thought that Formby, "along with [Harry] Lauder, Robey and [Albert] Chevalier, formed the leading quartette [sic] of the profession".

== Stage persona and technique ==
His art seemed absolutely guileless and childish, in the vein of the Hatter's madness, but there was method in it—that wonderful form of humour which the Londoner appreciates, but cannot imitate. It was racial of the Lancastrian soil.

— J. T. Grein, The Illustrated London News

Formby was the first comic to use a delayed entrance as a joke to make the audience laugh before he arrived: his orchestra played his entrance music, and then he failed to appear on stage. His act included songs, described by Smart and Bothway Howard as "characteristically simple, some with tunes derived from Methodist hymns, and with catchy choruses", and he would chat to the orchestra conductor and front rows, punctuating his stage patter—delivered in a deadpan style—with his cough. He used his health—particularly the coughing—as part of his act, and would say that he was "Coughin' well tonight!" He also created the phrase "It's not the cough that carries you off – it's the coffin they carries you off in!" One of Formby's nicknames, "The Wigan Nightingale" was coined because of the way he used his bronchial cough in his act.

The "John Willie" character, like much of Formby's act, used pathos as one of the comedic drivers, "but it was not contrived and was never mawkish", according to Alan Randall and Ray Seaton, two of Formby Jr's biographers. In his examination of British screen stars, Geoffrey Macnab agrees, and identifies that although Formby's jokes were about himself, "there was grit in the routines, a resolute denial of self-pity". The Times examined the performer's style of humour, and considered it "often crude, and always simple, but it was always true humour, and, what is more, it was invariably clean."

Much of Formby's humour was based in his north western roots, particularly Wigan, which he told people was where he was born, rather than Ashton. He would refer to taking his holidays at Wigan Pier, which was a small wooden platform on the Leeds and Liverpool Canal for loading coal, rather than a pleasure pier. The Manchester Guardian called him "Lancashire's accredited representative on the London variety stage ... clown-satirist of genius".

When he performed in London, Formby would change his act, introducing himself as "Good evening, I'm Formby fra' Wigan ... I've not been in England long"; he slightly modified his stage persona, and he played "the naïve boy trying to fit in with the sophisticated south". Smart and Boothroyd consider that "the contrast between his northern accent and metropolitan bravado was humorous, and the more urbane and sophisticated his audience the more George exaggerated his provincial gormlessness".

== Legacy ==
The unveiling of Formby's memorial

Six weeks after Formby's death, his son George first appeared on stage in a copy of his father's act; he initially appeared under the name George Hoy—using his mother's maiden name—but soon took his father's stage name. Formby Jr later went on to become the top British male star in box office takings between 1937 and 1943, and the highest-paid entertainer in Britain.

Chaplin, who derived some of his stage persona from Formby's, sailed in 1908 with Karno's troupe to the United States, where he developed the character of the Tramp, the image of which became universally familiar by 1915. George Orwell later used Formby's humorous concept of "Wigan Pier" in the title of his 1937 study of depression and unemployment in the area, The Road to Wigan Pier.

Formby left over 190 recordings, and after his death The Times commented, "There cannot be many people who have not heard at some time in their lives either the words or the refrain of 'John Willie – Come On', 'One of the Boys', 'I was Standing on the Corner of the Street', or 'Playing the Game in the West'", songs described by Fisher as "afizz with gaiety and champagne".

In October 1922 a large marble memorial was unveiled at the site of Formby's grave, in the presence of Formby Jr, Eliza and a large crowd. The memorial later became the resting place for both the younger Formby and Eliza. In June 2012 a blue plaque was unveiled at Hodgson Street, Ashton, Formby's birthplace.

== Sources ==
- Bret, David (1999). George Formby: A Troubled Genius. London: Robson Books. ISBN 978-1-86105-239-1.
- Fisher, John (1975). George Formby. London: Woburn-Futura. ISBN 978-0-7130-0139-6.
- Gildart, Keith (2013). Images of England Through Popular Music: Class, Youth and Rock 'n' Roll, 1955–1976. Basingstoke, Hampshire: Palgrave Macmillan. ISBN 978-1-137-38425-6.
- Kershaw, Baz (2007). Theatre Ecology: Environments and Performance Events. Cambridge: Cambridge University Press. ISBN 978-0-521-87716-9.
- Krishnamurthy, Aruna (2009). The Working-class Intellectual in Eighteenth- and Nineteenth-century Britain. Farnham, Surrey: Ashgate Publishing, Ltd. ISBN 978-0-7546-6504-5.
- Macnab, Geoffrey (2000). Searching for Stars: Stardom and Screen Acting in British Cinema. London: A&C Black. ISBN 978-1-4411-8425-2.
- Quigley, Joseph (1916). The Slogan – Sidelights on recruiting with Harry Lauder's Band. London: Simpkin, Marshall, Hamilton, Kent & Co. OCLC 35122379.
- Randall, Alan; Seaton, Ray (1974). George Formby. London: W. H. Allen. ISBN 978-0-491-01771-8.
- Richards, Jeffrey (2001). Imperialism and Music: Britain, 1876–1953. Manchester: Manchester University Press. ISBN 978-0-7190-6143-1.
- Richards, Jeffrey (2004). "Formby, George (1904–1961)". Oxford Dictionary of National Biography (online ed.). Oxford University Press. doi:10.1093/ref:odnb/33205. (Subscription, Wikipedia Library access or UK public library membership required.)
- Richards, Jeffrey (2010). The Age of the Dream Palace: Cinema and Society in 1930s Britain. London: I.B. Tauris. ISBN 978-1-84885-122-1.
- Robinson, David (1986). Chaplin: His Life and Art. London: Paladin. ISBN 978-0-586-08544-8.
- Russell, Dave (1997). Popular Music in England 1840–1914: A Social History. Manchester: Manchester University Press. ISBN 978-0-7190-5261-3.
- Russell, Dave (2004). Looking North: Northern England and the National Imagination. Manchester: Manchester University Press. ISBN 978-0-7190-5178-4.
- Smart, Sue; Bothway Howard, Richard (2011). It's Turned Out Nice Again!: The Authorized Biography of the Two George Formbys, Father and Son. Ely, Cambridgeshire: Melrose Books. ISBN 978-1-907732-59-1.
- St. Pierre, Paul Matthew (2009). Music Hall Mimesis in British Film, 1895–1960: On the Halls on the Screen. Cranbury, NJ: Associated University Press. ISBN 978-0-8386-4191-0.
