= John Tripp =

John Tripp may refer to:

- John Tripp (poet), Anglo-Welsh poet and story writer
- John Tripp (ice hockey), professional ice hockey player
- Jack Tripp, British actor

== See also ==
- John Trippe, naval commander
