= Ouida MacDermott =

English singer and actress

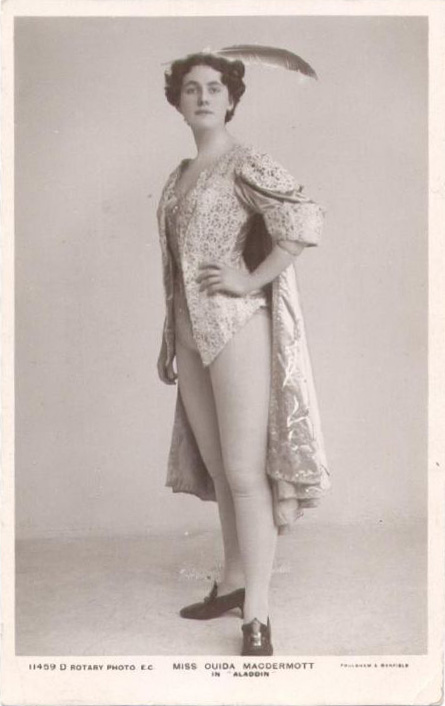
Ouida MacDermott in the title role in Aladdin at Bristol (1908)

Ouida MacDermott (24 May 1889 – 29 October 1980) was a British singer and actress whose career was mainly in music hall and as a principal boy in pantomime during the Edwardian era. She appeared on one of the first television broadcasts in 1930.

She was born on the Strand in London as Annie Louise Mary MacDermott, the youngest child of G. H. MacDermott, an English lion comique and Annie Milburn. Her father was already married to Mary Ann Stradwick, with whom he had a son, but all four of his illegitimate children with Milburn took their father's name.

Following her father onto the stage, MacDermott played Princess Arawanha in the pantomime Robinson Crusoe and His Man Friday at the Lyceum Theatre in London (1907–08) and the title role in the pantomime Aladdin at the Prince's Theatre in Bristol (1908–09).

In July 1910, she could be seen at the Argyle Theatre of Varieties in Birkenhead, whilst the following year, she was at the Palace Theatre of Varieties in Hull. She toured in the musical comedy Business As Usual in 1915, and the following year, returned to pantomime in Dick Whittington and His Cat at the Gaiety Theatre in Dublin.

MacDermott appeared in Fiddle-De-Dee at Dublin's Theatre Royal in 1918 and played Prince Glorio in the pantomime The Tale of Cinderella at the Scala Theatre (1928–29).

When the diarist and critic James Agate went on a round of pantomime visits "with the intention of rediscovering not only my lost youth but a lost young man, the Prince Charming of long ago" it was in MacDermott that Agate found "him whom I sought – the fair, the not too refrigerative, the inexpressive he of long ago . . . ruffling it with inimitable grace and swagger. . . . She, in short, was Prince Charming. For all that, I fancied I detected a shade of uneasiness in Miss MacDermott's gesture. Might it not be out of date to slap a thigh? No, dear lady and dear boy! Slap on! Slap ever! One heart, at least, beats for you." An early television pioneer, a performance by MacDermott was broadcast by the BBC on 10 April 1930, days after the very first television transmission.

She married at least three times: firstly, in 1909, to music hall artiste Sydney Arthur Leon Wood, the brother of Matilda Wood, who was better known as the performer Marie Lloyd. The marriage was dissolved in 1911 after her adultery with the music hall performer Jay Laurier. She and Laurier (aka James Alexander Chapman) married in Glasgow in December 1912; they were divorced in 1916, with Laurier citing John Charles Harrison. MacDermott married Charles Harrison in Edinburgh in May 1917; they divorced in 1922, with Harrison citing Thomas Barrett. She deserted her family, including her 6-year-old son, to return to the stage. In 1939, and listed as 'divorced', she was living with her brother James and his wife at Pound Cottage in Battle, Sussex.

She died at Nevetts Old People's Home in Buntingford, Hertfordshire, in 1980, aged 91.
