= Horace Mills =

British singer, actor and dramatist (1864–1941)

Horace Mills as the Dame in Jack and the Beanstalk (1911)

Horace Mills (1 September 1864 – 14 August 1941) was a British singer, actor and dramatist who specialised in playing pantomime dames in the early 20th-century.

Born in Portsea in Portsmouth in 1864, he was the oldest of six children born to Elizabeth Ann née Jolly and Herbert James Mills, a Colonel in the Ordnance Supply Board.

== Theatre career ==
He co-wrote the book for the musical play Miss Esmeralda (1887) to music by Meyer Lutz and first performed at the Gaiety Theatre in London.

His stage appearances include Bertie Fitz Bunnyon in As Large as Life (1890) at Terry's Theatre, Remendado in Carmen up to Data (1890) at the Gaiety Theatre Tom Edge in Zephyr (1891) at the Avenue Theatre, touring in The Circus Girl (1897), Widow Twankey in Aladdin at the Prince’s Theatre in Manchester (1900) with Ada Reeve and G. P. Huntley, in the Comedy Oddity ‘Mashing the Misses’ (1904) at the Argyle Music Hall in Birkenhead, Adolphus Dudd in The Girl Behind the Counter (1906), Valet in The Hon'ble Phil with Denise Orme and G. P. Huntley at the Hicks Theatre (1908), and Swaak in A Persian Princess (1909).

== Pantomime ==
For some years he appeared as the Dame in the annual pantomime at the Prince's Theatre in Bristol, playing the Dame in Humpty Dumpty (1906) and Jack and the Beanstalk (1911), the widow Mrs Tutt in the pantomime Goody Two Shoes (1915), Old Mother Hubbard in Mother Hubbard at Bristol (1922), and Mrs Tippett in Goldilocks and the Three Bears (1924).

== Personal life ==
He married Jessie Julia Raynes at the church of St John the Baptist in Plumstead in London on 18 February 1892. They retired to Bexhill-on-Sea where they were living in 1939.

Mills died at the Derbyshire Royal Infirmary in Derby in 1941 aged 76. In his will he left £6,324 9s 2d.
