= John Linehan (entertainer) =

Northern Irish entertainer

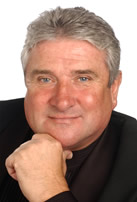
- Born: John Joseph Linehan; 1952 (age 73–74); Belfast, Northern Ireland.
- Known for: Charity work/Panto Dame
- Spouse: Brenda
- Children: 2

John Joseph Linehan, MBE (born 1952) is an Irish entertainer, most known for his drag queen character May McFettridge. Linehan has, in character, been a long-running feature on local radio and television, as well as a regular pantomime dame.

== May McFettridge ==
John Linehan was a car mechanic before he rose to fame in the guise of his plain-speaking, gap-toothed housewife character, May McFettridge. Eamonn Holmes, a relative, had asked Linehan to phone his then radio show, to liven the programme up. Linehan pretended to be a Belfast housewife, and the banter between the two attracted an unprecedented number of positive phone calls to the radio studio, many asking for a return of the women as a regular on the show.

Linehan invented the name and the character by ad libbing — the first name being that of his mother-in-law and the surname being that of an Antrim hurler by the name of Olcan McFettridge, whose exploits in a National Hurling League game had made headlines in the local newspaper, The Irish News, which happened to be beside Linehan when put on the spot.

The character became a regular on Downtown Radio. Since that time, Linehan has topped the bill as his character in the Christmas Pantomime in the Grand Opera House in Belfast for thirty consecutive years (2019/20 season).

On 2 December 2014, John was presented on stage with a bust of May McFettridge to mark his 25th consecutive year of performing at the Grand Opera House's pantomime. The bust will be kept permanently on view in the Grand Circle of the theatre opposite the bust of Frank Matcham, the architect of the building.

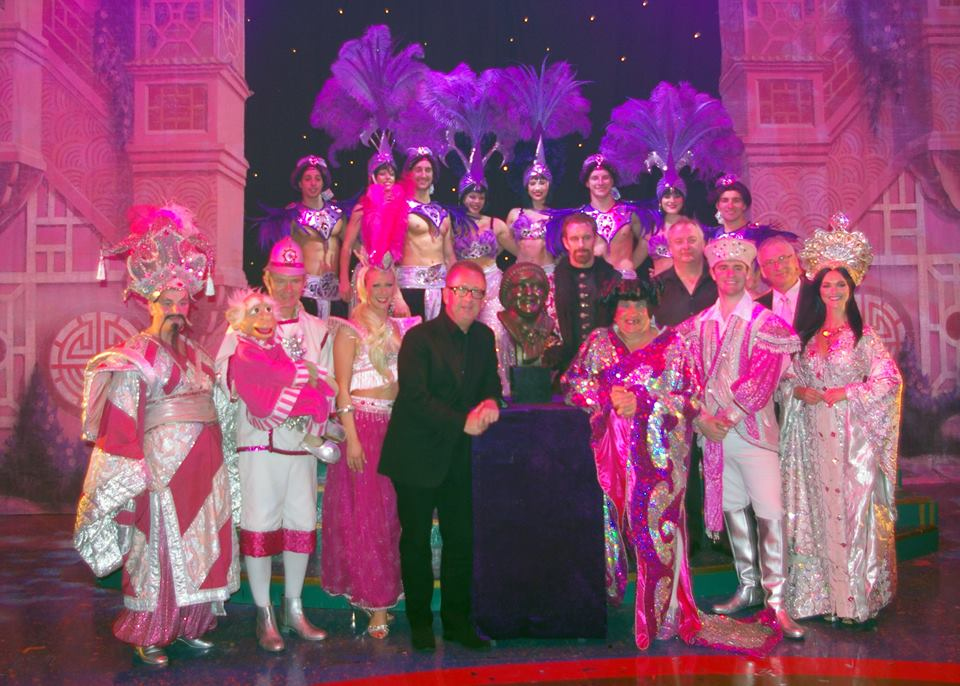
Nick Thomas, Chairman of Qdos Entertainment presenting the commemorative bust to be displayed at the Grand Opera House, Belfast

They were described by John Daly as 'the face that sank a thousand ships' during a charity event at the Odyssey in Belfast.

== Charity work ==
Linehan is also involved in charity work, appearing regularly in Northern Ireland's Children in Need broadcasts, and organising events such as golfing tournaments to help raise money for Children of the Crossfire. He was awarded the MBE in 2006 for charitable services in Northern Ireland.

== Pantomime ==
Linehan as McFettridge in pantomime

Linehan performs annually as the pantomime dame at the Grand Opera House, Belfast.

In 2019 Linehan celebrated 30 years as the pantomime dame at the Grand Opera House, Belfast.

In 2020 due to the coronavirus pandemic the Grand Opera House announced that their annual pantomime would not take place and was rescheduled to the 2021/22 season.

2026/27: The Little Mermaid as Queen May

2025/26: The Adventures of Pinocchio as Mrs Geppetto

2024/25: The Pantomime Adventures of Peter Pan as Mrs Smee

2023/24: Snow White and The Seven Dwarfs as May of The Mirror

2022/23: Cinderella as The Fairy Godmother

2021/22: Goldilocks and The Three Bears as Dame May McVetty

2020/21: CANCELLED DUE TO THE CORONAVIRUS PANDEMIC

2019/20: Beauty and The Beast as Mrs Potty

2018/19: Jack and The Beanstalk as Dame Trot

2017/18: Peter Pan as Mrs Smee

2016/17: Cinderella as The Fairy Godmother

2015/16: Snow White and The Seven Dwarfs as May The Cook

2014/15: Aladdin as Widow Twankey

2013/14: Sleeping Beauty as Queen May

2012/13: Cinderella as The Fairy Godmother

2011/12: Jack and The Beanstalk as Dame Trot

2010/11: Snow White and The Seven Dwarfs as Nurse May

2009/10: Aladdin as Widow Twankey

2008/09: Mother Goose as Mother Goose

2007/08: Cinderella as The Fairy Godmother

2006/07: Peter Pan as Mrs Smee

2005/06: Snow White and The Seven Dwarfs as Nurse May

2004/05: Jack and The Beanstalk as Dame Trot

2003/04: Dick Whittington as Sarah The Cook

2002/03: Cinderella as The Baroness

2001/02: Aladdin as Widow Twankey

2000/01: Snow White and The Seven Dwarfs as Nurse May

1999/00: The Adventures of Peter Pan as The Nurse

1998/99: Cinderella as The Baroness

1997/98: Jack and The Beanstalk as Dame Trot

1996/97: Mother Goose as Mother Goose

1995/96: Aladdin as Widow Twankey

1994/95: Dick Whittington as The Cook

1993/94: Jack and The Beanstalk as Dame Trot

1992/93: Snow White and The Seven Dwarfs as Dame Doughnut

1991/92: Babes in The Wood as The Cook

1990/91: Robinson Crusoe as Mrs Crusoe

== Other appearances ==
Linehan appeared in the film Divorcing Jack as the 'Announcer'. Later European versions of the 'Divorcing Jack' DVD had May McFettridge segments edited out due to social sensitivities in Eastern European countries such as the Czech Republic or Slovakia.

== Personal life ==
Linehan is an Irish language speaker. He is married to Brenda, and they have two daughters.

Linehan has a long association with Northern Amateur Football League club Malachians F.C. and spent two seasons as manager of their reserve team.

In the early 1980s, Linehan was diagnosed as having syringomyelia and he had neurosurgery in 1983 following which he had meningitis. The syringomyelia has caused muscle wastage and some loss of sensation on his left side.

In 2013 John had a knee replacement at Kingsbridge Private Hospital, Belfast after years of crippling pain.
