= Daisy Wood =

English music hall singer

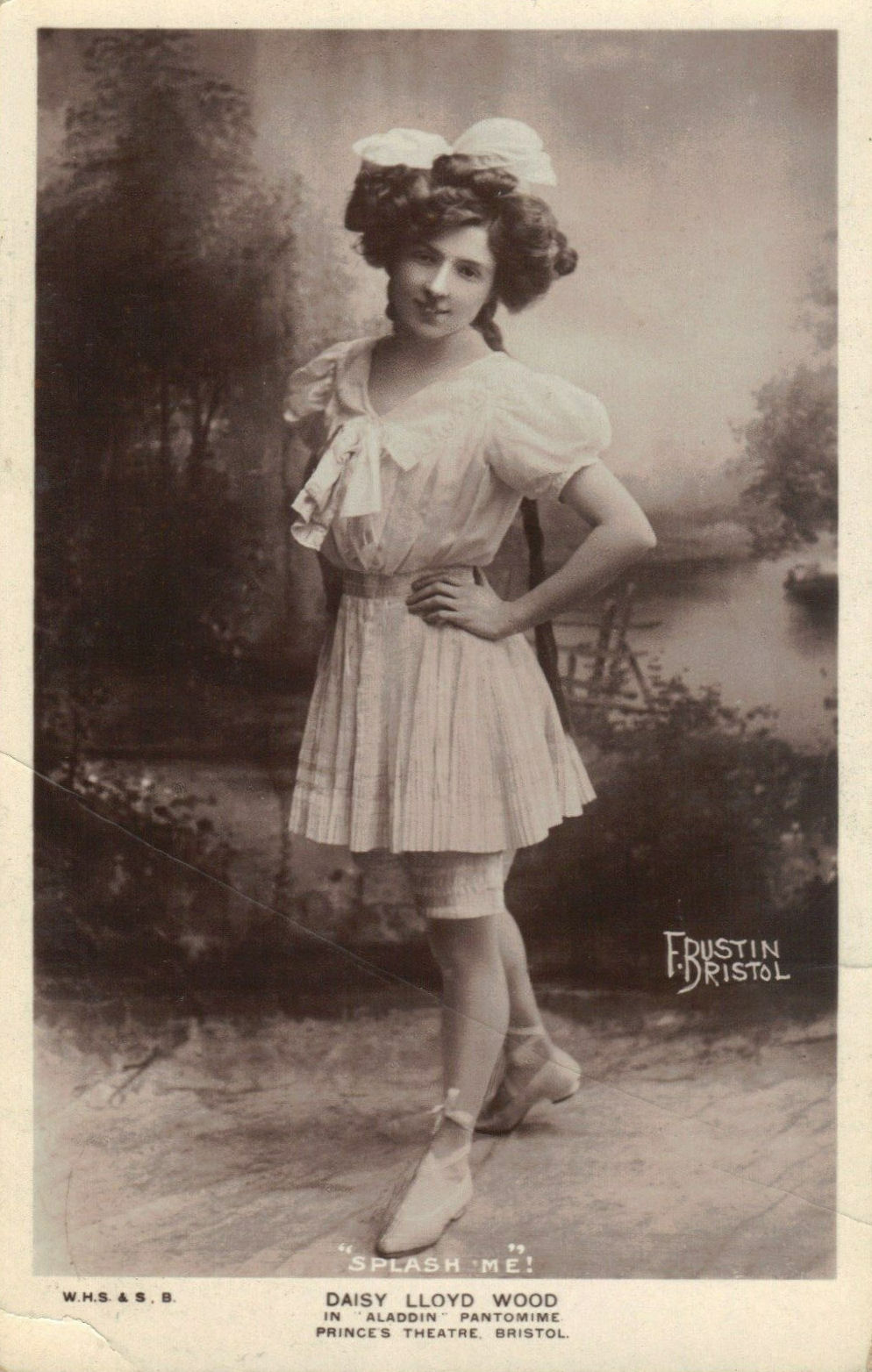
- Daisy Wood in Aladdin at the Prince's Theatre, Bristol (1909)
- Born: Daisy Violet Rose Wood; 15 September 1877; Hoxton
- Died: 19 October 1961 (aged 84); Banstead, Surrey
- Occupation: Music hall singer
- Spouse: Donald Alexander Munro 1899–1911

Daisy Violet Rose Wood (15 September 1877 – 19 October 1961), was an English music hall singer.

== Life and career ==
Wood was born in Hoxton, London, the fifth of nine children, the oldest being Matilda Alice Victoria Wood (1870–1922), who performed under the stage name Marie Lloyd. Seven of the siblings took up stage careers. In their earliest years, costumed by their mother (Matilda Mary Caroline), they performed as The Fairy Bells Minstrels, singing temperance songs in local missions and church halls. This ceased when the eldest sister made her professional debut at the age of fifteen. The children were entranced by music hall, their father (John, an artificial florist) working in the evenings at the nearby Royal Eagle Tavern.

Daisy made her own first professional appearance in a play entitled My Willie at the South London Palace, on 17 March 1890. She went on to perform a solo musical act, making the most of her petite and dainty figure. She was thought to have been the prettiest of the sisters.

On 26 April 1899 she married Donald Alexander Munro, an insurance broker and chairman of the Crown Theatre. She was only 21, and her husband 26, when she retired from the theatre. They had two children, Donald (1902) and Dorothy Grace (1906). They moved to Kensington, but Donald fell ill the following year, and their fortunes were under pressure.

In her late twenties, Daisy returned to the stage, and due to the increasing fame of her sisters, at the top of the bill. In 1908 she was offered an immense sum to tour New York with her sisters (Marie, Alice and Rosie), by the William Morris Agency, and in the autumn they performed in New York, to great acclaim.

Her husband died on 24 September 1911, aged 39. She continued to tour throughout the British Isles and internationally, until she finally retired in 1928, but occasionally returned to the stage with her sisters Alice and Rosie during the 1930s and World War II.

Daisy Wood died in 1961, aged 84 at her home in Banstead, Surrey.

== Selected Songs ==
- Fishing for a Sweetheart
- One of the Ruins Cromwell knocked about a bit (made famous by Marie)
- Oh, Marie Lloyd!
- Popsy Wopsy
- Violets
