= Tom E. Murray =

American comedian & actor (1858–1936)

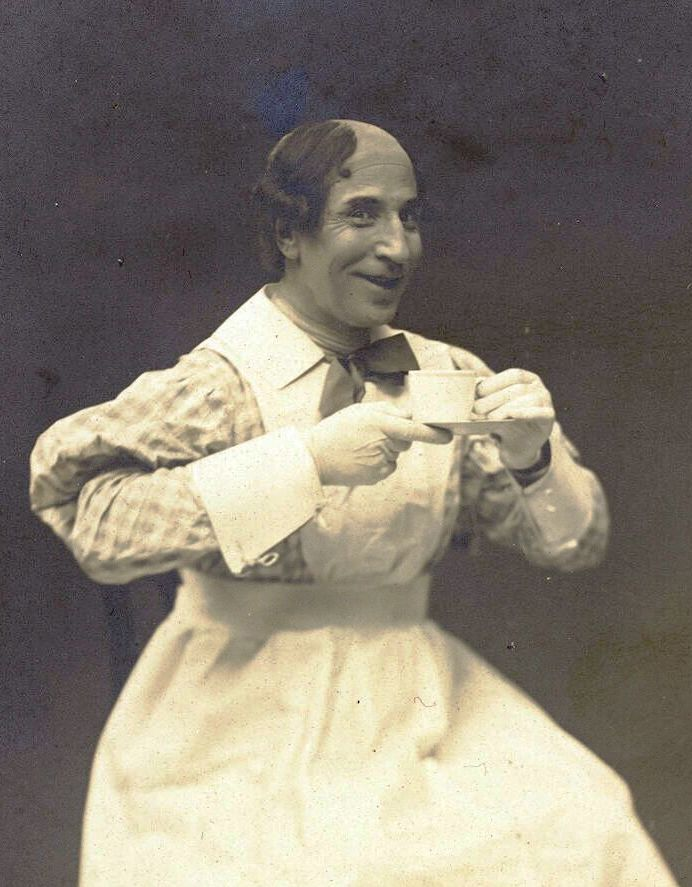
- Murray as Mother Goose, 1907
- Born: Thomas Edward Murray; July 11, 1858; Boston, Massachusetts, U.S.
- Died: January 13, 1936 (aged 77); Cambridge, Massachusetts
- Occupations: Comedian, actor, writer

Thomas Edward Murray (July 11, 1858 – January 13, 1936), known professionally as Tom E. Murray, was an American stage comedian and actor, popular between the 1890s and 1910s especially in Britain.

== Biography ==
Sources differ as to his place and year of birth. The 1870 US census gives his country of birth as Ireland, but his published obituary and passport application state that he was born in 1858 in Boston, Massachusetts, the son of Sarah (née Gilgan) and Thomas Murray. At the age of 16, he left home to become an actor, and toured the United States in legitimate theatrical productions.

He made his London debut in 1894, in On the March at the Prince of Wales Theatre, and his stage appearances led the critic Clement Scott to compare him with the comic performers Artemus Ward and Sol Smith Russell. Reviews described him as "a genuine humorist", and referred to his "humouristic idiosyncrasy.... We know no actor whose vein of humour is like to it." In 1903 he appeared on Broadway in An English Daisy, before returning to England where he became a featured star of pantomimes, sometimes in dame roles, in shows including Mother Goose and Ali Baba. He featured in a short Bioscope film made by Mitchell and Kenyon in 1904, to promote the show Forty Thieves in Glasgow; the film is now preserved by the British Film Institute.

In 1908, his autobiography and compendium of jokes, Tales I Have Told!, was published in London. He continued to work in British theatres, writing, producing and starring in a musical comedy, The Harem Doctor, in Manchester in 1911. In about 1916 he returned to the US, where he continued to perform in theatres.

From about 1920 he lived with his wife and family in Cambridge, Massachusetts. He died at his home in Cambridge in 1936, at the age of 77.

He is not to be confused with the actor Tom H. Murray.
