= Pantomime dame =

Traditional role in British pantomime

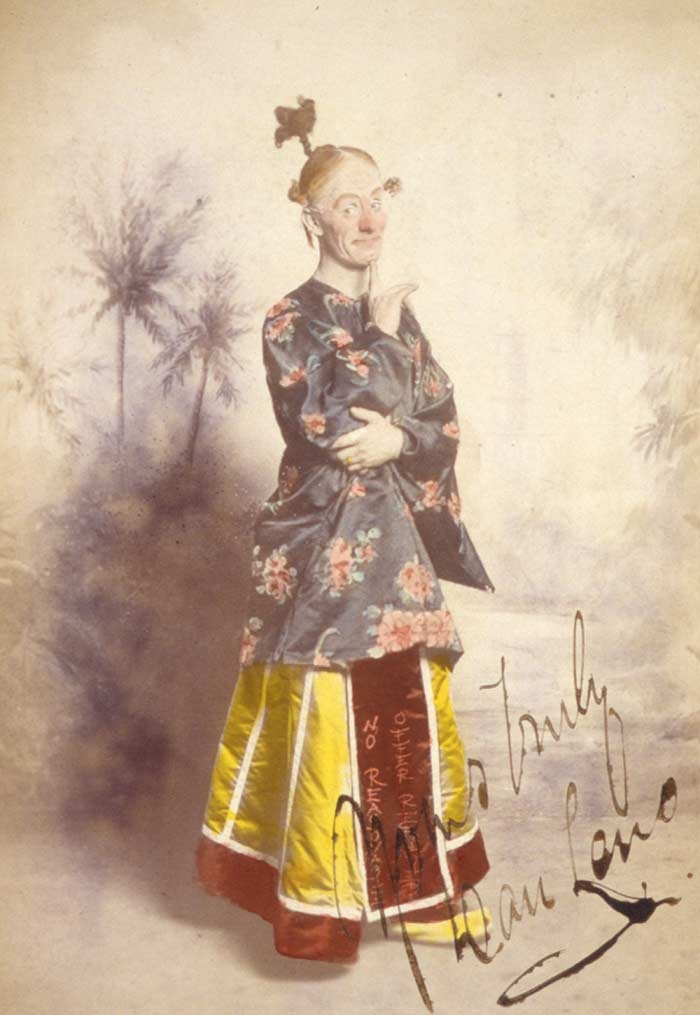
Dan Leno as Widow Twankey in Aladdin at the Theatre Royal, Drury Lane (hand-coloured photograph by Alfred Ellis, 1896)

A pantomime dame is a traditional role in British pantomime. It is part of the theatrical tradition of travesti portrayal of female characters by male actors in drag. Dame characters are often played either in an extremely camp style, or else by men acting butch in women's clothing. They usually wear heavy make up and big hair, have exaggerated physical features, and perform in an over-the-top style.

== Dame characters ==
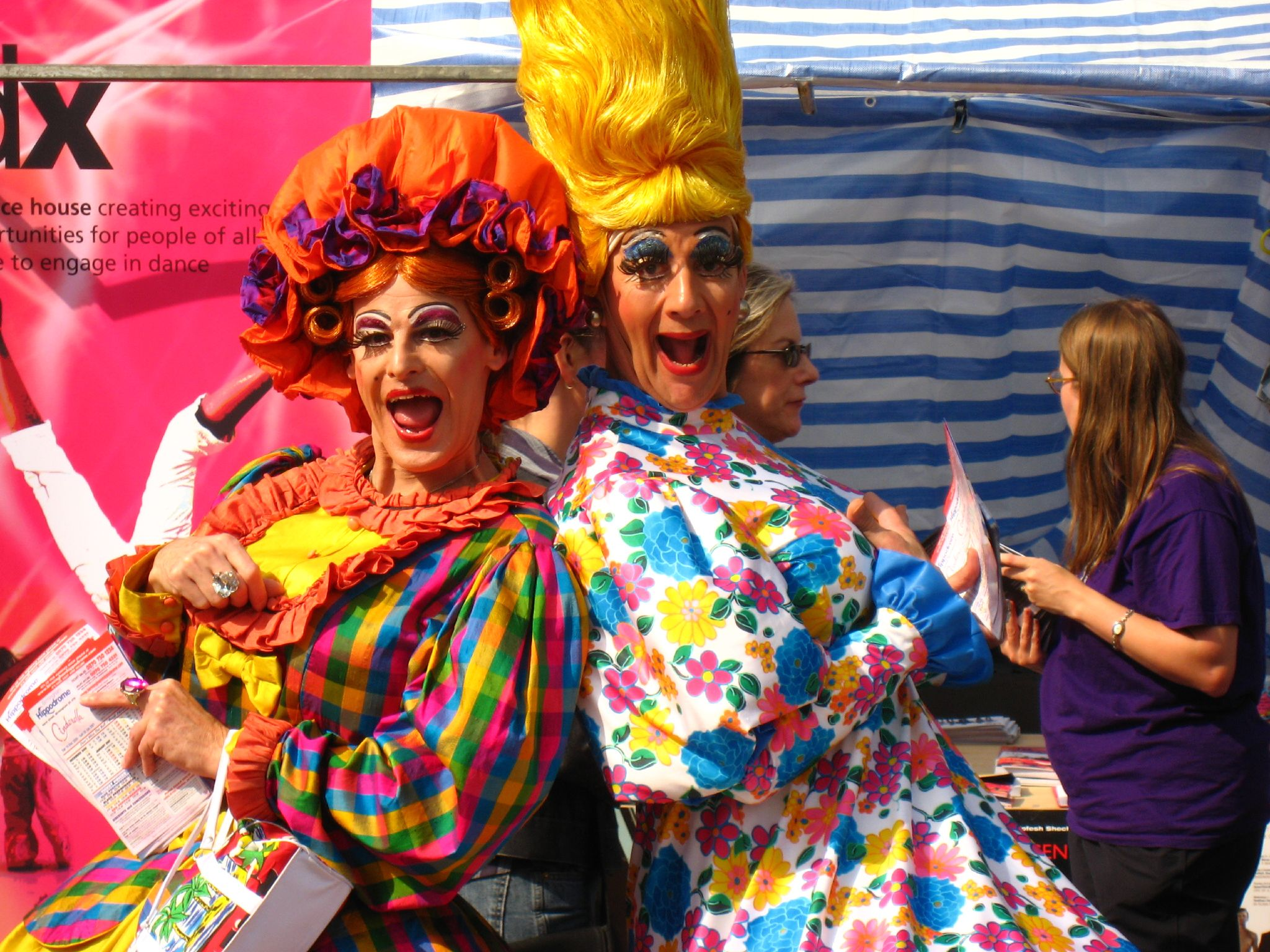
Modern pantomime dames

Characters who are played as pantomime dames are often, though not exclusively, older, matronly women. They may be the protagonist's mother, as in Jack and the Beanstalk and Robinson Crusoe, or a nursemaid to the protagonist, as in Sleeping Beauty and Snow White. Although often warm and sympathetic characters, dames may also be employed as comic antagonists, such as with the Ugly Sisters, wicked stepmother or the Fairy Godmother in Cinderella. Although some pantomimes traditionally do not contain standard dame roles, certain productions of those stories add a dame character, for example, in many versions of Peter Pan. Pantomime dames often have numerous costume changes in a performance, each costume change being more extravagant than the last. Other examples of dame characters include:

- Widow Twankey, Aladdin's mother in the pantomime versions of the story
- Mother Goose
- The nanny or nurse in Babes in the Woods
- The cook in Dick Whittington
- The queen in Puss in Boots
- Goldilocks' mother in Goldilocks and the Three Bears, who runs a circus in many versions of the pantomime.

== Notable pantomime dames ==
- Peter Alexander (born 1952), notable dame in pantomimes in Yorkshire
- Trevor Bannister (1934–2011), English actor
- Stanley Baxter (1926–2025), award winning Scottish actor and impressionist, famous for his lavish productions, notably at The King's Theatre, Glasgow
- Christopher Biggins (born 1948), television personality, actor
- Steven Blakeley (born 1982), has appeared in numerous pantomimes at the Theatre Royal, Windsor
- Douglas Byng (1893–1987), a legendary dame who appeared in over 50 pantomimes, Byng was also a noted cabaret and revue artiste. He was the first glamorous dame and designed all his own costumes
- Herbert Campbell (1844–1904), a highly popular pantomime dame alongside Dan Leno at the Theatre Royal, Drury Lane
- Les Dawson (1931–1993), English comedian, remembered for his deadpan style and curmudgeonly persona
- Norman Evans (1901–1962), "Evans' distinctive dame evolved out of nosy neighbour Fanny Fairbottom, a character he played on the sketch show Mr Tower of London. Fanny was hugely popular, and allegedly inspired Les Dawson to create the character of Ada"
- Rikki Fulton (1924–2004), award winning Scottish actor and comedian who also made numerous appearances in Scottish pantomimes, notably at The King's Theatre, Glasgow
- Patrick Fyffe (1942–2002), creator of Dame Hilda Bracket, one half of Hinge and Bracket
- Shaun Glenville (1884–1968), had a 50 year career in pantomime, often opposite his wife Dorothy Ward
- Peter P. G. Gordon, resident dame at the Yvonne Arnaud Theatre, Guildford in consecutive pantomimes since 2006
- Chris Harris – (1942–2014), dame at Theatre Royal, Bath for many years, and writer and director of many pantomimes
- Melvyn Hayes (born 1935), television personality, actor well known for playing Gunner/Bombardier 'Gloria' Beaumont in BBC TV's It Ain't Half Hot Mum
- John Inman (1935–2007), comedy actor well known for playing Mr Humphries in BBC TV's Are You Being Served?
- Berwick Kaler (born 1947), currently Britain's longest serving dame; has played his extremely non–camp dame at York Theatre Royal since 1977
- George Lacy (1904–1989), widely regarded as the finest dame of his generation, and the originator of the dame's multiple costume changes
- Danny La Rue (1927–2009), Irish-born British entertainer known for his singing and female impersonation
- Dave Lee (1948–2012), British comedian known for his work in pantomimes around Kent
- Dan Leno (1860–1904), a legendary pantomime dame, whose ghost is said to haunt the Theatre Royal Drury Lane
- John Linehan (born 1952), Northern Irish actor and pantomime dame better known as the character May McFettridge. Resident Dame at the Grand Opera House, Belfast
- Sir Ian McKellen (born 1939), English actor and British cultural icon
- G. S. Melvin (1886–1946), Scottish pantomime dame famous for his song "I'm Happy When I'm Hiking"
- Horace Mills (1864–1941), British pantomime dame of the early 20th–century, particularly at the Prince's Theatre, Bristol
- Tom E. Murray (1858–1936), American-born comedian popular in Britain in the 1890s-1910s
- Jimmy O'Dea (1899–1965), Irish actor and portrayer of Biddy Mulligan the Pride of the Coombe in Dublin pantomimes
- Paul O'Grady (1955–2023), British comedian and actor best known for presenting the daytime chat television series The Paul O'Grady Show, and his drag queen comedic alter ego Lily Savage
- Shaun Prendergast (born 1958), resident dame at the Lyric Theatre, Hammersmith since 2010. Has been described in the Daily Telegraph as being 'finest, funniest pantomime Dame in London'
- Harry "Little Tich" Relph (1867–1928), noted for his various characters, including The Spanish Señora, The Gendarme, and The Tax Collector. His most popular routine was his Big-Boot Dance, which involved a pair of 28-inch boots
- Ben Roddy (born 1974), English actor, resident dame at The Marlowe Theatre, Canterbury since 2012
- Clive Rowe (born 1964), regularly plays the dame at the Hackney Empire and was nominated for an Olivier Award in 2008 for his performance in 'Mother Goose' at that venue
- Allan Stewart - (born 1950), Scottish entertainer best known for playing the dame at the King's Theatre, Edinburgh. He played Buttons, Wishee Washee and other comic parts for many years but transitioned to playing the dame after playing the character of Aunty May on television
- Kenneth Alan Taylor (born 1937), has played the pantomime dame for many years in his own productions at Nottingham Playhouse
- Tommy Trafford (1927–1993), Lancashire comedian and noted pantomime dame
- Jack Tripp (1922–2005), English comic actor, singer and dancer who appeared in seaside variety shows and revues
- Nick Wilton (born 1957), English actor and scriptwriter, has been a professional dame every Christmas since 2000

== See also ==
- Cross-gender acting
- Principal boy
- Drag show
- Köçek
- Travesti (theatre)
- Womanless wedding
