= My Old Duchess =

- Title card
- Original title: Oh, What a Duchess!
- Directed by: Lupino Lane
- Written by: Herbert Sargent; Con West
- Based on: Mumming Birds (sketch) by Fred Karno
- Produced by: Walter C. Mycroft
- Starring: George Lacy; Betty Ann Davies; Dennis Hoey
- Cinematography: James Wilson
- Edited by: Charles Frend
- Music by: Idris Lewis
- Production company: British International Pictures
- Distributed by: Pathé Pictures
- Release date: 4 January 1934
- Running time: 64 minutes
- Country: United Kingdom
- Language: English

Oh, What a Duchess! (also known as My Old Duchess and Mummers) is a British comedy film directed by Lupino Lane and starring George Lacy, Betty Ann Davies and Dennis Hoey. It was written by Herbert Sargent and Con West based on an original sketch "Mumming Birds" by Fred Karno, and was made at Elstree Studios. The screenplay concerns a stage manager who disguises himself as a duchess.

== Plot ==
The Montague Nelson West End Repertory Company are the guests of the Duke's butler, while the Duke is on holiday. An American businessman, Jesse Martin, and his daughter, Sally Martin, arrive and want a tour of the castle. They mistake one of the actors for the Duke, so naturally, somebody must pose as the duchess. The ruse suddenly ends when Irving's wig falls off and he is exposed. However, Mr. Martin is so impressed with his acting skills, he invites the repertory company to Hollywood, to be introduced to an agent he knows.

== Cast ==
- George Lacy as Irving
- Betty Ann Davies as Sally Martin
- Dennis Hoey as Montagu Neilson
- Fred Duprez as Jesse Martin
- Renée Macready as Valerie
- Florence Vie as Mrs Neilson
- Hugh E. Wright as Higgins
- Patrick Aherne as Gaston
- Harry Bright
- Daphne Courtney as maid

== Production ==
It was the feature film debut for George Lacy, who had previously appeared in many touring companies as a female impersonator. It was also the film debut for sixteen year old Daphne Courtney. The song "Stepping Stones", sung by Lacy and Davies, was written and composed by Robert Stanley, Harry Tilsey and Tolchard Evans.

== Release ==
In July 1933, Kinematograph Weekly reported the film was to be screened on 22 August 1933, at a trade show at the Hippodrome in London. In December 1933, according to Kinematograph Weekly, the film premiered at a "suburban kinema" on 10 December 1933, and stated "it is no exaggeration to say that the usual crowded Sunday night audience simply laughed themselves hoarse at the remarkable performance of the star." The film was then screened on 4 January 1934 at the Phoenix Theatre in London.

== Reception ==
Picturegoer said "the producers of this film have refrained from tagging it with a label, so, after seeing it – if you do see it – you may call it a farce, or a farce with music, or anything you please; it is difficult to appreciate why any responsible company should want to make this type of picture unless it be for the said company's private amusement."

The Norwood News wrote Oh, What a Duchess, directed by Lupino Lane is ample proof that the inimitable comedian is something more than an actor; Lacey who gives an impersonation of the Duchess of Stonehaven will cause roars of laughter."

The South Wales Argus said the film is "one long laugh from beginning to end; Lacy is a member of a repertory company, and his great ambition is to become an actor of the first magnitude; however, his attempts on the first rung of the ladder, though uproariously funny, are far from successful, following a series of misunderstandings, he impersonates a duchess, and from here good, honest fun waxes fast and furious."

British film critic David Quinlan said it was a "rather outmoded farcical comedy, an extension of Karno's old music-hall sketch Mumming Birds, designed to show off Lacy's talent for female impersonation."

The Dorset Echo commented that "Lacy leads in a riotous comedy, the film might have been modelled on the famous peeress in "Alice in Wonderland"; comic situations abound and picturegoers will hesitate between laughter and tears as the situation develops."

The Huddersfield Daily Examiner noted that "Lacy's masquerade as the Duchess of Stonehaven provides high burlesque."

The Era opined that "there is a good deal of slapstick and music hall humour of that obvious and popular kind which Lacy understands so well, Davies as an ingenue looks pretty, sings well, and gives hint of much promise, Macready, who has little to do, makes her part stand out, and Courtney, Wright and Aherne do well in small parts."

== Home media ==
The film was released on the 2015 DVD "British Comedies Of The 1930s Volume 2", along with the 1935 British comedy drama film It's a Bet.
