= A Persian Princess =

Edwardian musical comedy

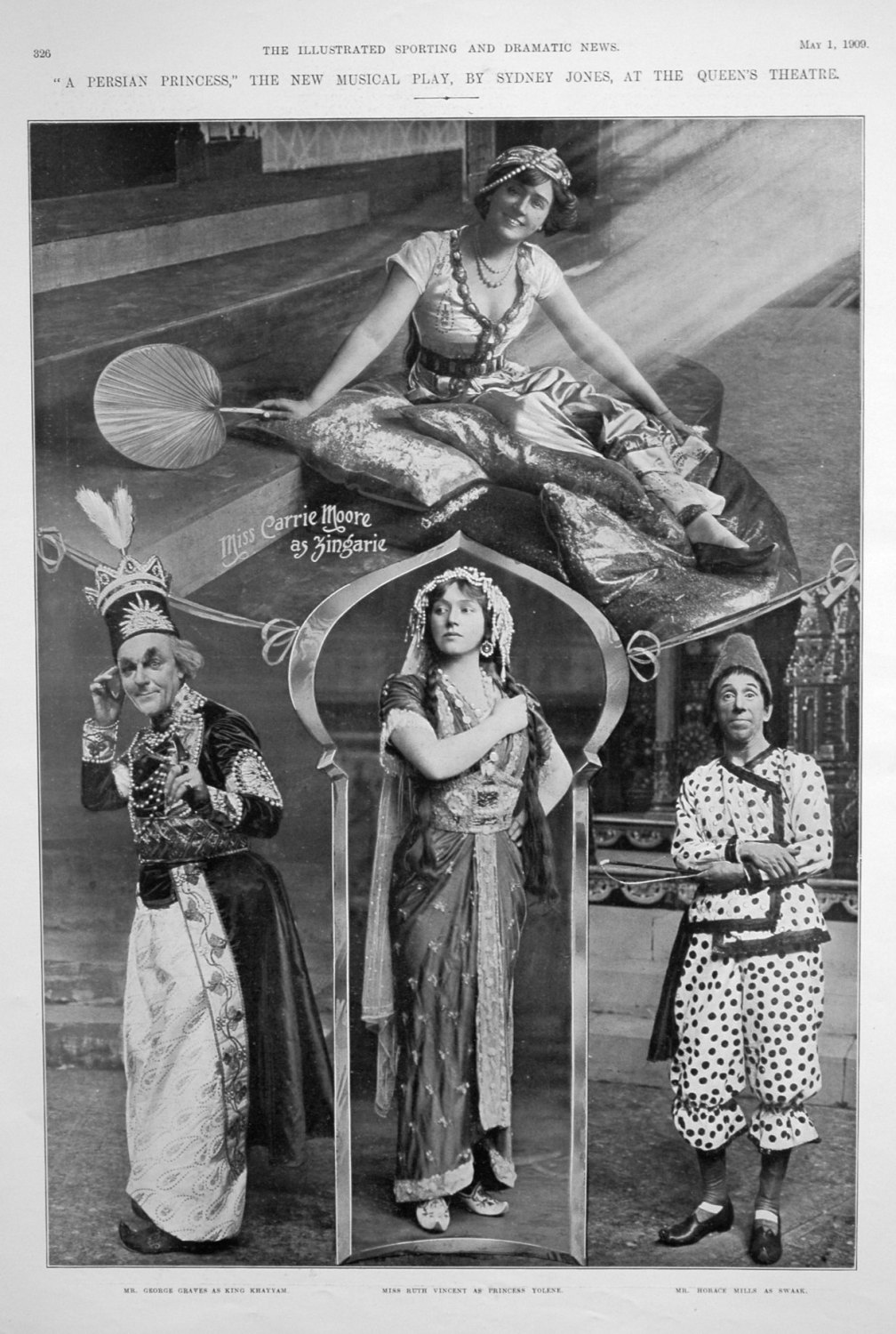
George Graves (left), Carrie Moore (top), Ruth Vincent and Horace Mills in A Persian Princess, The Illustrated Sporting and Dramatic News (1909)

A Persian Princess is an oriental-themed Edwardian musical comedy in two acts, with a book by Leedham Bantock and P. J. Barrow, lyrics by Percy Greenbank and music by Sidney Jones, with additional numbers by Marie Horne. It premiered on 27 April 1909 at the Queen's Theatre in London. Despite its experienced and highly regarded cast the show opened to poor reviews and had a short run of 68 performances, closing on 3 July 1909.

== Roles and original cast ==
- Princess Yolene (King Khayyam's Daughter) – Ruth Vincent
- King Khayyam – George Graves
- Zingarie (a Clove Gatherer) – Carrie Moore
- Prince Hassan (Son of King Khayyam) – Clarence Blakiston
- Prince Omar (Son of King Khayyam) – Noel Fleming
- Ujujube (King Khayyam's Favourite Dancer) – Vivienne Tailleur
- Selim (a Coffee Bearer) – Master George Burns
- The Lady Ayala (The Royal Housekeeper) – Lily Iris
- Swaak (The Keeper of the Royal Camels) – Horace Mills
- Amm Zad (The Keeper of the Slaves) – John Morley
- El Tabloid (The Court Physician) – Aubrey Fitzgerald
- Akbar (The Captain of the Guard) – J. Warren Foster
- Mustapha (The Old Man of the Desert) – Sidney Bracey
- Lulu (a Slave Girl) – Beatrice Harrington
- Xya-La (a Townswoman) – Isabel Agnew
- King Khalifah – M. R. Morand

Chorus of Courtiers, Musicians, Bodyguards, Merchants, Turtle Fishers, Egg Seekers, Ivory Carvers, Guards and Slaves, etc.

== Musical numbers ==
Cover to the score of A Persian Princess – Keith Prowse (1909)

=== Act I ===
The Slave Market outside King Khayyam's Palace

- 1 Opening Number: Mustapha and Girls
- 2 Trio: Amm Zad, Swaak and Zingarie – "Zingarie"
- 3 Song: Omar and Chorus – "When I am King"
- 4 Duet: Yolene and Omar – "Idle Promises"
- 5 Entrance: Trio and Chorus – Khalifah, Zingarie and Swaak – "The King and the Camel"
- 6 Song: Zingarie and Guards – "The Doggies and the Bone"
- 7 Song: Yolene and Chorus of Girls – "In the Dark"
- 8 Song: Swaak and Chorus – "Insomnia"
- 9 Quartet: Ayala, Omar, Swaak and El Tabloid – "In the Swim"
- 10 Chorus and Entrance of Slaves
- 11 Song: Amm Zad and Chorus – "The Slave Driver"
- 12 Song: Yolene and Chorus – "Moon Blossom"
- 13 Finale

=== Act II ===
King Khayyam's Palace

- 1 Opening Chorus
- 2 Duet: Zingarie and Swaak – "A little Coral Island"
- 3 Duet: Omar and Yolene – "The Mirror of Happiness"
- 4 Trio:Khayyam, El Tabloid and Ayala – "The Doctor the Patient and the Nurse"
- 5 Song: Yolene and Chorus – "The Juniper Tree"
- 6 Dance: Ujujube
- 7 Glee: Khayyam, Khalifah, Swaak and Zingarie – "Poor Alfred"
- 8 Song: Ayala and Girls – "A Cup of Coffee"
- 9 Song: Omar – "Cupid's Caravan"
- 10 Song: Zingarie and Chorus – "Come to Persia"
- 11 Song: Yolene – "The Land of Heart's Content"
- 12 Wedding Chorus
- 13 Finale
