= Carrie Moore =

Australian actress

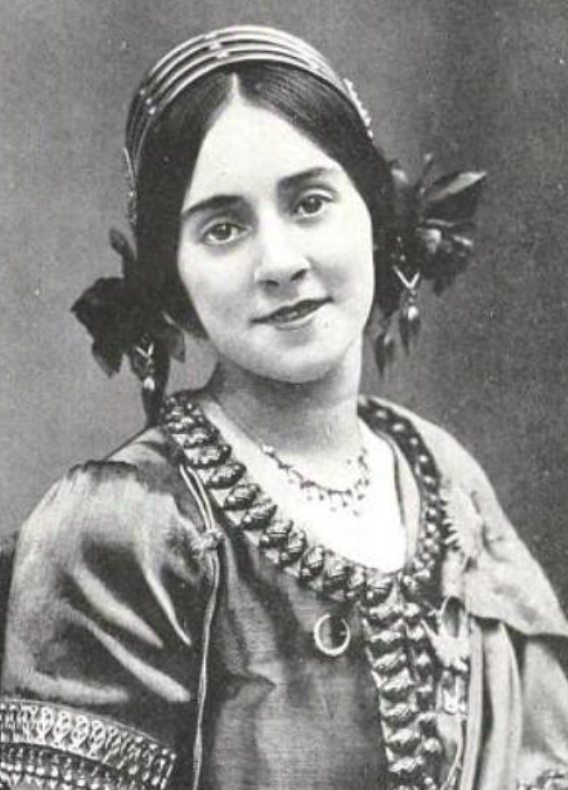
- Carrie Moore in costume for "The Cingalee" (1904)
- Born: Caroline Ellen Moore; 31 July 1882; Geelong, Australia
- Died: 5 September 1956 (aged 74); Sydney, Australia

Carrie Moore (31 July 1882 – 5 September 1956) was an Australian actress who achieved fame on the Australian and British stage. She was born Caroline Ellen Moore in Geelong, Victoria, on 31 July 1882, the third of the nine children of Robert William Moore, a labourer and Mary née Wyatt.

She first appeared on stage in Geelong in local amateur productions. By late 1895, she had joined J. C. Williamson and was appearing in the Christmas pantomime, Djin Djin, attracting positive reviews. After successfully understudying in 1897 and 1898, Moore performed for Williamson's "Royal Comic Opera Company" in a number of leading roles. In a highly publicized case she took Ernest Tyson to court alleging "breach of promise", in August 1901. The matter was settled out of court. In July 1903 she left Australia for England, where she appeared for producer George Edwardes. For five years she performed on the London stage and in provincial theatre, becoming "a much-paragraphed and much-photographed actress."

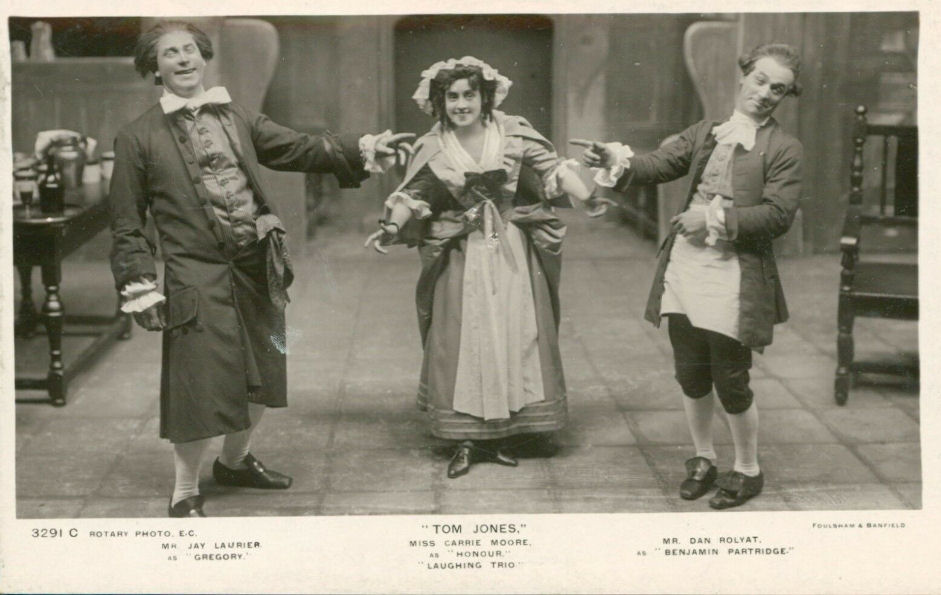
Jay Laurier (left) Carrie Moore and Dan Rolyat in Tom Jones (1907)

In mid-1908 she returned to Australia to perform the role of Sonia in The Merry Widow for Williamson, a role that brought her critical acclaim. She married Englishman Percy Bigwood in September, the event attracting press attention in part because of another action for "breach of promise", this time brought against Bigwood by a Miss Silva. The marriage also proved to be bigamous – on the couple's return to England it transpired Bigwood already had a wife and child, as a 1912 divorce action showed. On her return to England, Moore appeared in A Persian Princess (1909) and on stage for producer Robert Courtneidge. She made several return trips to perform in Australia, in 1912 and 1917.

Moore was estranged from Bigwood by the time of his death from pneumonia in 1915. She married wealthy Sydney bookmaker John Wyatt in 1918 and retired from the stage. She obtained a divorce from Wyatt in 1932 and returned to play a few supporting roles on stage, including in Music in the Air and a Command Performance in London in 1938. In 1945 she appeared in her only film, a supporting role in Charles Chauvel's Sons of Matthew. She died in relative poverty and obscurity in Sydney, in 1956.
