= Mona Vivian =

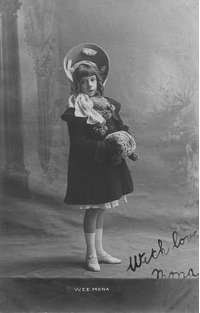
Photograph of Mona Vivian, aka "Wee Mona", c 1900 or thereabouts

Mona Vivian (11 February 1894 – 9 June 1971) was a popular English pantomime stage artist in the early years of the twentieth century.

== Early life ==
Mona Vivian was born Annie Mona Jessie Vivian in Aston, Warwickshire. Her parents were William Henry Robert Vivian and Anne Griffith. She began her stage career at a young age, performing as the character "Wee Mona".

== Acting career ==
She performed in local pantomime, notably in Blackpool, performing as "Mona Vivian and her Blackpool Wavelets", where she sang of leaving half her tights on the flying trapeze, and swayed her hips in imitation of Mae West, saying "Say, don't anybody recognise the motions". She would tell a member of the orchestra that his name must be Nero because "I'm burning up - while he's fiddling".

In 1921 she made a recording with the London Hipprodrome Orchestra.

== Personal life ==
In 1927 she married Hilton Crowther, the millionaire businessman and founder of Leeds Football Club. On Thursday 19 May "The Stage" newspaper reported that "The marriage took place on Monday at a registrars office in the West End of MONA VIVIAN and HILTON CROWTHER". The marriage was not a success and ended with a divorce settlement of around £1,000,000. She died on 9 June 1971.
