= George Lacy =

British entertainer and actor (1904–1989)

- Born: 27 January 1904; Newington, London, England
- Died: 11 January 1989 (aged 84); Wrexham, Wales
- Occupations: Actor, entertainer, pantomime dame
- Years active: 1918–1984

George Lacy (27 January 1904 – 11 January 1989) was a British entertainer and actor, best known for his groundbreaking performances as a pantomime dame, particularly "Mother Goose".

== Biography ==
Born in Newington, London, he made his first stage appearance as a comedian aged 14, and soon started appearing in pantomimes. He first appeared as a pantomime dame aged 19, and featured as Mother Goose in a show in Leeds in 1929. He made the role his own, and introduced the tradition of the Dame changing her costume throughout the show, each change becoming increasingly flamboyant. He designed and made his costumes himself – for one show performing in a costume designed as a billiard table, complete with balls and cues – and wrote many of his scripts and songs.

As well as performing in pantomimes for over 60 years, Lacy also starred in other travelling musical theatre shows around the country, and in variety programmes in which he would sometimes interpose his increasingly well-known Dame persona. Part of his success was due to his ability to deliver "working class gags with a posh accent". He took the lead role in the 1934 Lupino Lane comedy film My Old Duchess (also known as Oh! What a Duchess), in which he "was able to remain convincingly feminine with just the right degree of eccentricity to be funny, but not grotesque."

Widely regarded as "the finest Dame of his generation", he continued to perform each year in pantomimes until his final shows, aged 80, at Southsea in 1984. He died in Wrexham, north Wales, in 1989, aged 84.
