= Kenneth Alan Taylor =

British pantomime writer and actor (born 1937)

Kenneth Alan Taylor (born 1937) is a British pantomime writer and actor. He is best known for having played the pantomime dame for thirty years in his own productions at Nottingham Playhouse.

== Career ==
He started writing Pantomimes in 1962 in Oldham, and then moved to the Nottingham Playhouse to write there for more than 30 years. He was artistic director of Nottingham Playhouse for seven years. According to Nick Clark of The Stage magazine, "He is one of the UK’s foremost pantomime writers, directors and, until recently, dames."

He also played Cecil Newton in Coronation Street from 1987 to 1988 and again in 1990.

== Awards and recognition ==
He was awarded best actor in a lead role and MTA for The Father. He was also awarded the BEM for services to theatre.

His awards include the Manchester Evening News best supporting actor for Price and a Nottingham University honorary doctor of letters in 2011. In January 2019, Nottingham City Transport named one of their buses after him to mark his 35th Nottingham Playhouse Pantomime.

== Personal life ==
He was born in 1937 in Canning Town, London.

Taylor is married to Judith Barker. They have two children: award-winning make-up designer Jessica Taylor and Award-winning lighting designer Jason Taylor.

He has five grandchildren.
