= George Graves (actor) =

English comic actor (1876–1949)

George Graves, 1912

George Windsor Graves (1 January 1876 – 2 April 1949) was an English comic actor. Although he could neither sing nor dance, he became a leading comedian in musical comedies, adapting the French and Viennese opéra-bouffe style of light comic relief into a broader comedy popular with English audiences of the period. His comic portrayals did much to ensure the West End success of Véronique (1904) The Little Michus (1905; for which he invented the Gazeka), and The Merry Widow (1907).

In addition to musical comedy, operettas and revues, Graves specialised in pantomime and music hall. Later in his career, he was a frequent broadcaster and made several films, always in comic roles, but continued to perform on stage. His last stage success was in Me and My Girl (1937).

== Early life and career ==
Graves was born in London and made his stage debut at the age of 19 in an Edwardian musical comedy in Portsmouth. In its obituary notice, The Times wrote, "from the line then chosen [he] deviated during the next 40 years only into pantomime and music hall sketches." Although he could neither sing nor dance, he made his career in comic parts in musical pieces. He toured the British provinces in productions of The Shop Girl (1896), The Gay Grisette (1898), Miss Chiquita (1899), and The Skirt Dancer (1900). He then toured to Russia and South Africa in the early years of the 20th century in performances of Kitty Grey, A Runaway Girl, The Geisha, and Florodora.

Graves's first success on the London stage was as General Marchmont in The School Girl in 1903, followed the next year by MacSherry in Madame Sherry and Coquenard in Messager's Véronique (1904). For the next five years, Graves was cast in comic roles in George Edwardes productions, becoming a leading comedian of his day.

In 1905 Graves was chosen to play the General in the British premiere of Messager's The Little Michus, but he became ill and had to join the cast later in the run. He habitually improvised comic dialogue during rehearsals and for this piece he invented a mythical creature called "the Gazeka" which caught the fancy of the London public. After appearing in a revival of The Geisha (1906), in which his style was criticised as being too broad, he was again prevented by illness from taking the comic lead in a new show; in The Merveilleuses (1906) he was replaced by W. H. Berry. His greatest success for Edwardes was in the British premiere of The Merry Widow (1907), in which he played Baron Popoff, a role that he would repeat many times during his career. The Observer wrote, "a great deal of the fun as provided by that clever comedian was more English than 'Marsovian'."

Graves did not stay in The Merry Widow for the whole of its long run. In 1908, he left the Edwardes management, and appeared in The Belle of Brittany. The other comic lead was Walter Passmore, who was judged less effective than Graves because he stuck to a weak script instead of improvising as Graves did. The Times wrote of Graves, "Time after time, as in his favourite manner he hugs a lady close and delivers to her a monologue, he introduces so much that is new that when the lady's turn does come she is quite unable to speak for laughter. And the audience never stops laughing." In 1909 he played King Khayyam in A Persian Princess at the Queen's Theatre in London.

As Abanazar, 1909

Pantomime was another prominent part of Graves's theatrical career. He was, in the words of The Times, "a pillar of Drury Lane at Christmas". His roles included Abanazar in Aladdin (1909), Jack's mother in Jack and the Beanstalk (1910), The King in Hop o' my Thumb (1911), and the Duke of Monte Blanco in The Sleeping Beauty (1912). These and appearances in music hall shows interspersed his career in musical comedy.

== First World War and later years ==
When the First World War began in 1914, Graves concentrated on charity shows, revue and variety. One such revue was Nuts and Wine. His only wartime appearance in musical comedy was in 1916, when he appeared with Gertie Millar in Houp La!. This, the first production by C. B. Cochran, opened the new St. Martin's Theatre. After the war, Graves continued to work in variety and revue. In 1918 Graves married actor Madge Compton (née Mussared), but he left her in 1921, and she successfully sued for divorce in 1923. His return to musical comedy was in 1923, in a revival of The Merry Widow, with Evelyn Laye, Carl Brisson and Derek Oldham. Graves once again received high praise for his performance as Popoff. The production was so popular that it transferred from Daly's to the larger Lyceum Theatre.

In 1925, Graves made the first of many broadcasts for the BBC. His first new musical comedy of the 1920s was in 1926, when Robert Courtneidge directed Lehár's The Blue Mazurka on tour and then at Daly's, with Gladys Moncrieff and Bertram Wallis. The Times thought Graves not altogether comfortable in the show: "His methods are not quite suited to the sentimental humours of the piece." Graves appeared on Broadway several times, in 1907, 1929 and in the early 1930s. Graves's daughter, Georgina, died in 1930 at the age of 23. He returned to the stage the following year where he appeared in a revival of Florodora at Daly's. In 1932 he once again played Popoff in The Merry Widow.

In the 1930s, Graves acted in films, including Those Were the Days, a 1934 version of Pinero's The Magistrate with Will Hay and Lily Morris, and Heart's Desire (1935) starring Richard Tauber. After appearing in two revivals of operettas (Lilac Time in 1936 and The Vagabond King in 1937), Graves made the last great success of his career as Sir John in Me and My Girl (1937).

Graves' health deteriorated in 1949, and he was admitted to Guy's Hospital in the London Borough of Southwark. He died the same year at the age of 73 and was cremated at Golders Green Crematorium.
