= Jack Tripp =

English comic actor, singer, dancer, and pantomime dame

Jack Tripp MBE (4 February 1922 – 10 July 2005) was an English comic actor, singer and dancer who appeared in seaside variety shows and revues and became best known for his many performances as a pantomime dame.

Born in Plymouth, Devon, Tripp was the only son of a baker, William Tripp, and his wife Lillian. At a very young age he attended dancing classes and entered tap dancing competitions; leading to appearances in local clubs where his was billed as Plymouth's Fred Astaire. When war broke out, Tripp joined up to serve in the Royal Electrical and Mechanical Engineers. Whilst in the army, he joined Stars in Battledress where he performed in Europe and the Middle East.

After the war, Tripp took up acting professionally and appeared as a singer and dancer in variety shows and revues. He made his debut in the West End understudying Sid Field in Piccadilly Hayride at the Prince of Wales Theatre in 1946. Tripp was with the Fol-de-Rols concert party for fourteen years, and this led to his own seaside show Take a Tripp.

Tripp is best known for his appearances as a pantomime dame in which he excelled. He appeared in at least 35 pantomimes wearing the most elaborate costumes. The Stage once described him as "the John Gielgud of pantomime dames". In 1982 he appeared in a television documentary The Pantomime Dame. During the 1990s he often teamed up with Roy Hudd. In 1996 he was made a MBE for his "services to pantomime". His last performance was in Mother Goose in Plymouth in 1996. His last stage appearance was in the revival of Sandy Wilsons pastiche 1930s musical Divorce Me, Darling! at the Chichester Festival Theatre in July 1997.

Off stage. Tripp was modest and quiet. He became disenchanted with modern pantomime and retired in 2000 in his home in Hove. On 10 July 2005 he was taken ill in his home and died a few hours later in the Brighton General Hospital.

His lifelong partner on and off stage was Australian-born Allen Christie.
