= Argyle Theatre =

Former theatre and music hall in Birkenhead, England

Coordinates: 53.389°N 3.021°W

The Argyle Theatre was a theatre in Birkenhead, on the Wirral Peninsula, England. It was opened in December 1868, initially as the Argyle Music Hall.

== History ==
=== Building ===
The theatre had seating for about 800, with pillars in the auditorium and long, narrow galleries running down either side. Its name was changed in 1876 to the Prince Of Wales Theatre and for several years plays were performed, before the name "Argyle" was eventually restored.

=== Repertoire ===
The owner and manager between 1888 and 1934 was Dennis J. Clarke, a local councillor, businessman and entrepreneur. He was both popular and well respected and was responsible for helping launch numerous showbusiness careers. Established artistes such as W.C. Fields, Dan Leno and Marie Lloyd performed during the early years of the theatre's life. Stars such as Charlie Chaplin, Bud Flanagan & Chesney Allen, Harry Lauder, Stan Laurel, George Formby (Senior) and Eric Morecambe & Ernie Wise performed at the Argyle Theatre at the beginning of their careers. The comedian, actor and ukulele player George Formby (Junior) made one of his earliest performances at the Argyle Theatre in 1921. In this instance, he was not a success and was booed off stage.

=== Technology ===
In addition to the wealth of talent performing at the Argyle in person, it had other claims to fame. Clarke stated in 1896 that his theatre's vitagraph display was the first such display of moving pictures in England, outside London. The Argyle also had the distinction of being the first theatre to host radio broadcasts.

=== Bombing and closure ===
On 21 September 1940, the theatre received a direct hit during the Blitz of World War II and never re-opened. However, the shell of the building remained in situ until 1973, when it was finally demolished.

== Legacy ==
The theatre was mentioned in the famous 1971 Morecambe and Wise sketch that featured conductor André Previn. Previn was told that the booked guest, Yehudi Menuhin, had cancelled because he was "opening at the Argyle Theatre, Birkenhead in Old King Cole".

A large, decorative stone sign that was once attached to the Argyle Theatre's exterior was moved to the Williamson Art Gallery for preservation, prior to demolition. The inscription on the sign read: "Argyle Theatre Of Varieties. Two Performances Nightly".

A department store car park now occupies the site and a play, "Argyle Remembered", was written to commemorate the theatre which is performed by Heswall Musical Society.
