= Marie Lloyd Jr. =

British entertainer, composer and actress (1888–1967)

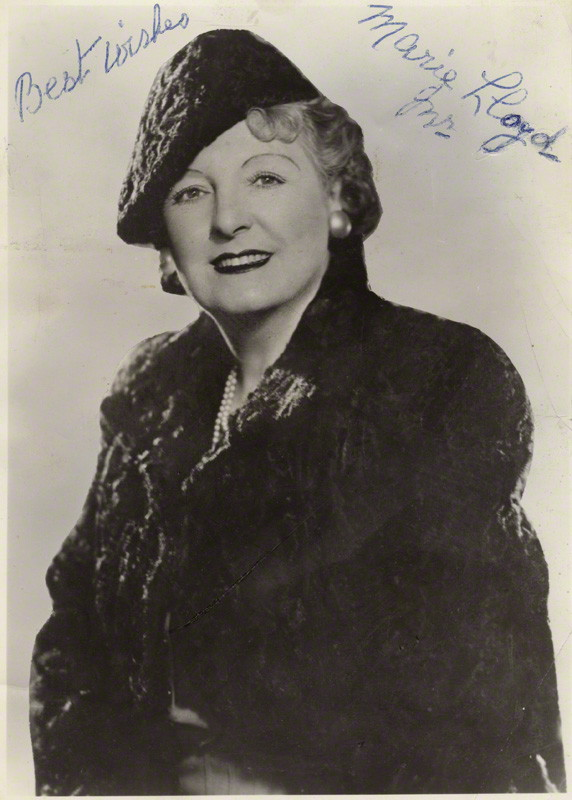
- Lloyd in the 1940
- Born: Marie Matilda Victoria Courtenay; 19 May 1888; Shoreditch, London, UK
- Died: 27 December 1967 (aged 79); Hove, East Sussex, UK
- Resting place: Hampstead Cemetery, West Hampstead, London
- Occupations: Actress; composer; entertainer
- Years active: 1896–1967
- Spouse: Harry Aylin (m. 1907; died 1939)
- Mother: Marie Lloyd

Marie Lloyd Jr. (born Marie Matilda Victoria Courtenay; 19 May 1888 – 27 December 1967) was a British entertainer, composer and actress notable for her performances impersonating her mother, the music hall performer Marie Lloyd.

== Early life ==
She was born as Marie Matilda Victoria Courtenay in Shoreditch in London in 1888, the daughter of ticket-tout Percy Charles Courtenay (1862—1933) and the popular music hall performer Marie Lloyd (1870—1922). Her mother was only 18 years old when she was born, and was already gaining notice as an up-and-coming performer. However, her parents' marriage was a mostly turbulent and unhappy one, as Percy Courtenay was disliked by Lloyd's family and friends. Before long, Courtenay became addicted to alcohol and gambling, and grew jealous of his wife's close friendship with the 13-year-old actress Bella Burge. He also became angry at the numerous parties Lloyd hosted for fellow members of the music hall profession, including Gus Elen, Dan Leno and Eugene Stratton.

== Career ==
Her first appearance on a stage was as a child in 1896 when, billed as Little Maudie Courtenay, she toured South Africa with her mother and Alec Hurley, her mother's lover and later second husband.

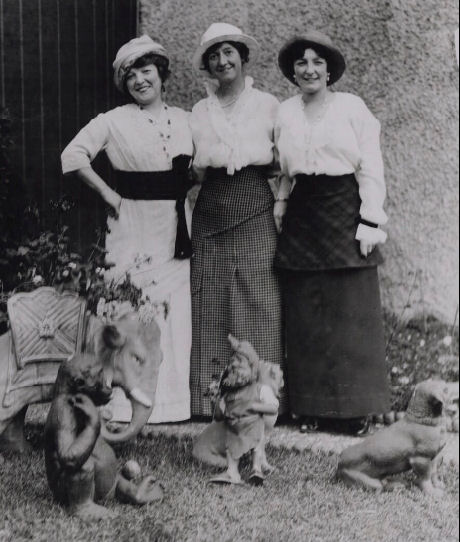
Marie Lloyd, Bella Burge and Marie Lloyd Jr., 1910

After her mother's death in 1922, Courtenay impersonated her, performing her mother's act as Marie Lloyd Jr. in music halls and on variety bills. She acted in several films, including the Deforest Phonofilm Marie Lloyd in 1926, appeared in the shorts Old Timers and Pal O'Mine in 1936, and in the early television broadcast Music Hall Cavalcade in 1937. She appeared as Marie Lloyd in the 1943 wartime British historical musical film Variety Jubilee. In 1958, she was among the studio guests when Bella Burge was surprised by Eamonn Andrews for the television series This Is Your Life.

Poster for Thanks for the Memory (1960s)

During the 1960s, she toured in Thanks for the Memory for Don Ross, a nostalgic revival of music hall entertainment first staged in 1947. She also appeared in the act The Lloyd Family with her aunts Rosie, Daisy and Alice Lloyd, singing songs they and Marie Lloyd had made famous.

== Personal life ==
Like her mother before her, Marie Courtenay married aged 18, and, like her mother was to do a few years later, she married a jockey. In Courtenay's case, this was Harry Aylin (1885—1927), with the two tying the knot in 1907 at the church of St Stephen the Martyr in Hampstead. A witness to the marriage was her mother's friend and dresser, Bella Burge, a boxing promoter known as Bella of Blackfriars. The couple divorced in 1913 following his alleged adultery and desertion. The divorce was rescinded in 1914 when Harry Aylin provided evidence to the Court of Lloyd's numerous acts of adultery with various men, which she had not disclosed in her original divorce petition the previous year. Costs were awarded against her.

== Death ==
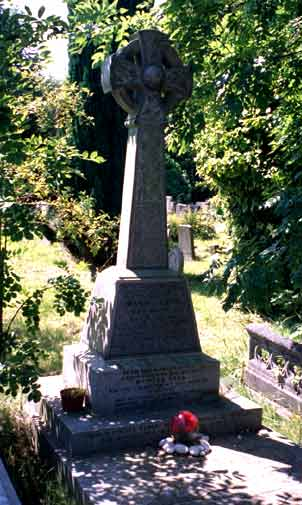
Lloyd is buried with her mother and grandparents in this grave in Hampstead Cemetery, London

Marie Lloyd Jr. died in 1967, aged 79, in Hove, East Sussex. She was buried in the same grave as her mother and grandparents in Hampstead Cemetery.
