= Miss Marie Lloyd =

2007 British television film

- Also known as: Miss Marie Lloyd: Queen of The Music Hall
- Genre: Period drama
- Directed by: James Hawes
- Starring: Jessie Wallace; Richard Armitage; Tom Payne
- Country of origin: United Kingdom

Production
- Running time: 80 minutes
- Production companies: BBC; Hat Trick Productions

Original release
- Network: BBC Four
- Release: 9 May 2007

Miss Marie Lloyd: Queen of The Music Hall is a British television drama directed by James Hawes and produced by Hat Trick Productions. It was first shown on BBC Four in 2007.

The film traces the turbulent and unconventional life of Edwardian music hall star Marie Lloyd, portrayed by Jessie Wallace. The drama formed part of BBC Four's Edwardians – The Birth of Now season.

== Cast ==
- Jessie Wallace as Marie Lloyd
- Richard Armitage as Percy Courtenay
- Matthew Marsh as Alec Hurley
- Tom Payne as Bernard Dillon
- Lee Williams as Freddie
- Shaun Parkes as 'The Showman'
- Angus Barnett as Mr Belafonte
- Amanda Root as Mrs Chant
- Annette Badland as Nelly Powers
- Sue Elliot-Nicholls as Bridey

== Reception ==
In her article ahead of the broadcast, Sarah Dempster for The Guardian said that: "Wallace's performance is as bracing as a power walk down Lambeth High Street". The reviewer for The Scotsman commented that the script was "awful", with it making "a pig's ear of what was obviously an interesting life". The review concluded with a reference to Wallace's character in EastEnders, stating that Wallace: "was perfectly fine in the role, giving it as much of the old [Kat] Slater oomph as she could, but she'll have to find much better things than this if she wants to escape typecasting."

== Awards ==
Lucinda Wright was nominated in the costume design category for the British Academy Television Craft Awards for 2008.

== DVD ==
This production is available on DVD, distributed by Acorn Media UK.
