= Jessie Wallace =

English actress (born 1971)

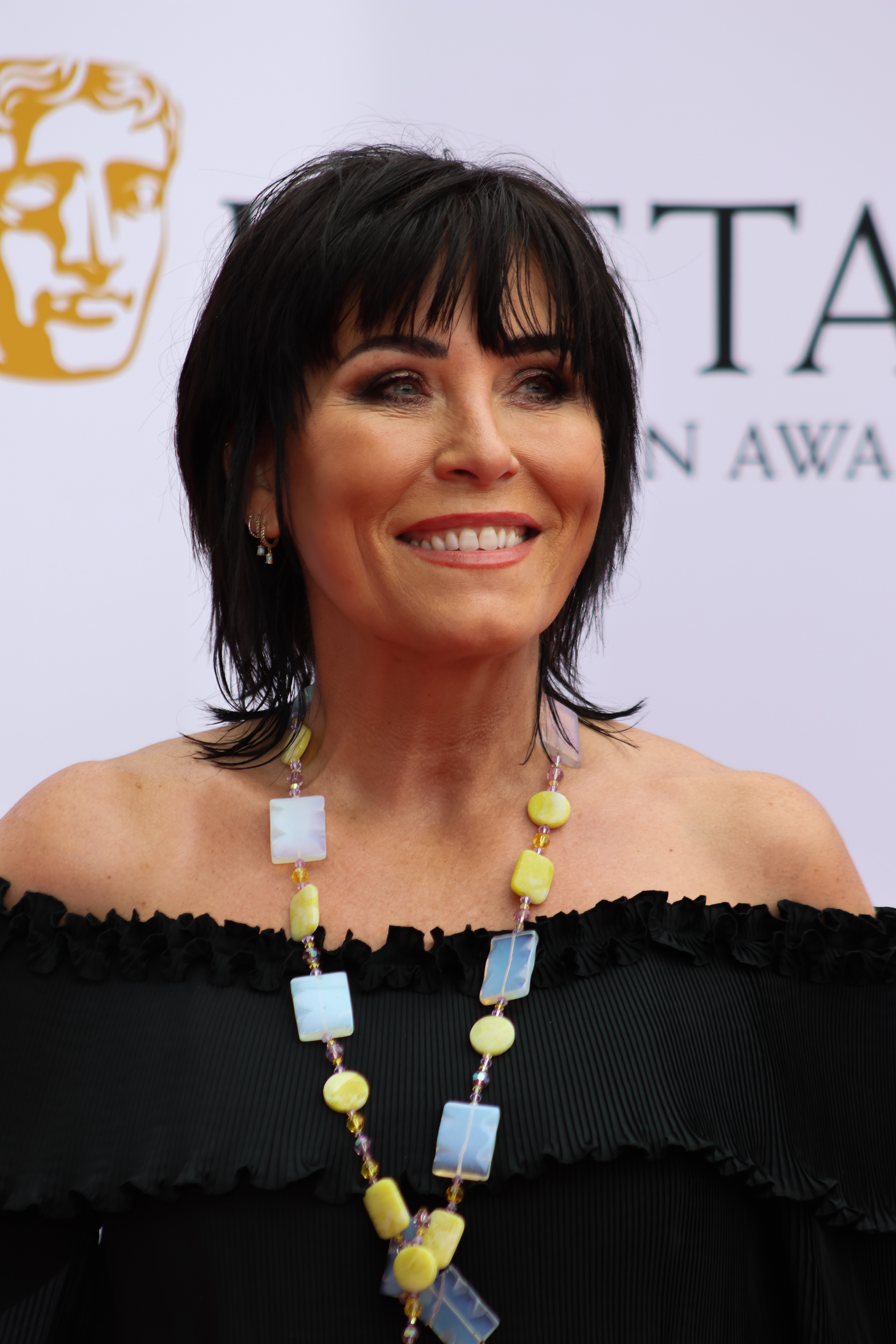
- Wallace in 2026
- Born: Karen Jane Wallace; 25 September 1971 (age 55); Enfield, North London, England
- Occupation: Actress
- Years active: 1999–present
- Children: 1

Karen Jane Wallace (born 25 September 1971), known professionally as Jessie Wallace, is an English actress. She made her acting debut in the television police series The Bill and rose to prominence for her role as Kat Slater on the BBC soap opera EastEnders (2000–2005, 2010–present). For her portrayal of Kat, she has won seventeen awards, including Most Popular Newcomer at the National Television Awards and the British Soap Award for Best Newcomer in 2001, Most Popular Actress at the National Television Awards in 2003 and the British Soap Award for Best Actress in 2011. She also played Pat Phoenix in the BBC Four television film The Road to Coronation Street, for which she was nominated for the 2011 BAFTA TV Award for Best Supporting Actress.

== Early life ==
Karen Jane Wallace was born on 25 September 1971 in the London Borough of Enfield to James Wallace, a telecommunications engineer, and his wife Annette (née Leach), a secretary. Wallace is of Irish ancestry, by way of Cork and Dublin. Her parents divorced when she was aged three, and she and her sister were raised by their father; however, she would see her mother at weekends. She adopted her stage name after her late grandmother.

== Career ==
After schooling, Wallace trained as a make-up artist at the College of North East London in Tottenham and worked at the Royal Shakespeare Company for two years. She met and became friends with actor Iain Glen, who helped her apply for London drama college The Poor School, from which she graduated in 1999. While undertaking auditions – including for Andrew Lloyd Webber's Sunset Boulevard, she worked as a barmaid at her local pub, The Royal Oak in Loughton, Essex. Her first television appearance was in an episode of the ITV police drama series The Bill in 1999 as P.C. Karen Lace.

=== EastEnders ===
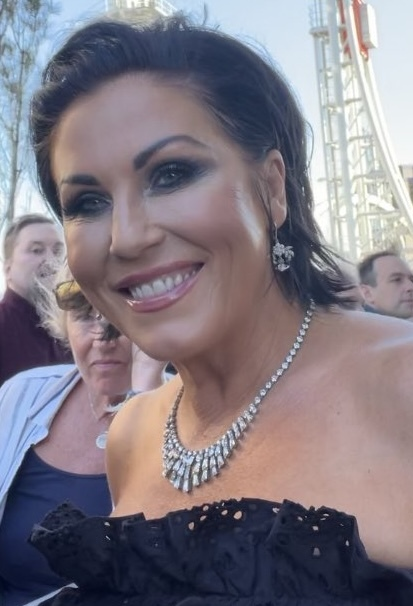
Wallace at the 2023 British Soap Awards

Wallace is known for playing Kat Slater in BBC One soap opera EastEnders. She initially played the role between September 2000 and December 2005. In 2007, Wallace said she hadn't ruled out a return to EastEnders. In February 2010, it was announced that Shane Richie was returning to play Alfie Moon, leading to speculation that Wallace would also be returning. On 9 February 2010, the BBC confirmed that Wallace was returning to EastEnders, reprising her role as Kat Slater. Kat and Alfie's return scenes aired in September 2010.

In April 2015, the BBC announced that Wallace and Richie would depart from the show temporarily to appear in a six-part BBC One drama series, Kat & Alfie: Redwater. In the series, Kat and Alfie visited Ireland in the "search for answers to some very big questions". Speaking about the show, Wallace commented: "I have always loved working on EastEnders so when I heard of this new drama to take Kat and Alfie outside of Walford, I couldn't believe our luck. To be exploring the next chapter for Kat as well as working alongside my best mate, Shane, is a dream come true and a huge compliment." However, Wallace and Richie later revealed on This Morning in January 2016 that Kat and Alfie would not be returning to EastEnders after the six-part drama, and the characters departed at the end of that month. In December 2017, it was announced that Wallace would reprise the role of Kat in EastEnders the following year, and she returned to the show permanently in March 2018.

=== Other work ===
During her break from EastEnders, Wallace made television guest appearances, including once as Kat Slater, in the 2005 French and Saunders Christmas special. In February 2006, Wallace was the guest host of an edition of the Channel 4 programme The Friday Night Project. In 2007, she appeared in the one-off BBC One television dramas A Class Apart opposite Nathaniel Parker, and The Dinner Party with Lee Evans and Alison Steadman. After visiting Hat Trick Productions with her agent, and singing an impromptu version of Marie Lloyd's song "The Boy I Love Is Up in the Gallery", she was offered the lead role in Miss Marie Lloyd – Queen of The Music Hall for BBC Four.

Wallace made her West End theatre debut, replacing Denise van Outen in the role of Maureen in Rent remixed at the Duke of York's Theatre from 27 December 2007 until 2 February 2008. Wallace played Amy Kriel in the third series of ITV's Wild at Heart and starred in a run of the play Haunted at the Arts Theatre from 24 May.

Wallace competed with partner Darren Bennett in the sixth series of Strictly Come Dancing which began on 20 September 2008. They were the fourth couple to be eliminated from the competition in week 4.

Wallace toured the UK in the 25th Anniversary production of Stepping Out by Richard Harris, playing the role of Sylvia. Wallace appeared as Pat Phoenix in The Road to Coronation Street, a one-off drama exploring the origins and conception of Coronation Street, to mark the show's 50th anniversary in December 2010.

In 2014, Wallace reprised her role as Marie Lloyd in the music video for Tim Arnold's single "The Piccadilly Trot". She later appeared on Arnold's album The Soho Hobo on a duet that he wrote called "Soho Sunset".

In May 2015, Wallace performed a duet at Soho Theatre with singer-songwriter Tim Arnold to mark the release of his album The Soho Hobo. The song marks her first recording on a pop album and was written especially for her by Arnold. Wallace was also cast as the Fairy godmother in the White Rock Theatre production of Cinderella. In July 2015, it was announced that Wallace would appear alongside Richie in a stage adaptation of The Perfect Murder by Peter James at the Theatre Royal in February 2016.

Wallace is a patron of the theatre charity The Music Hall Guild of Great Britain and America.

== Personal life ==
When Wallace joined EastEnders, her personal life became the focus of many tabloid newspapers. She had been in a three-year relationship with Mallorca-based ex-criminal Paul Whitworth. After being warned by BBC executives, she split with Whitworth and had a holiday romance with a 25-year-old man, who subsequently sold his story.

In November 2003, Wallace was suspended from EastEnders by the BBC for excess drinking, partying, and adverse publicity. She returned to the soap but was then stopped by police and arrested for drink driving, with a blood alcohol level one-and-a-half times over the limit. The BBC offered her counselling and while attending county court for sentencing she was accompanied by a policeman, Dave Morgan. Morgan and Wallace began dating. She gave birth to their daughter on 2 November 2004, but the couple split up shortly afterwards, with Wallace's lawyers placing a gag order on Morgan.

In a tabloid story which surfaced in September 2007 whilst Wallace was filming Wild at Heart in Johannesburg with others, one of whom suggested she still regularly took ketamine. Wallace admitted, at one point, to taking drugs, but denied taking them since the birth of her daughter.

In January 2020, Wallace was suspended from EastEnders again by the BBC, with a two-month suspension due to an "incident while filming".

In March 2022, Wallace became a grandmother for the first time, after her daughter gave birth to a son.

In June 2022, Wallace was arrested after she assaulted a police officer outside a nightclub in Bury St Edmunds. She was released without charge but received a conditional caution. In response, Wallace was issued a warning for "unacceptable behaviour" by EastEnders bosses.

== Filmography ==
=== Film ===
Year	Title	Role	Notes	Ref.
2017	Amoc	Lecturer		

=== Television ===
Year	Title	Role	Notes	Ref.
1999	The Bill	P.C. Karen Lace	Episode: "A Night to Forget"	
2000–2005, 2010–present	EastEnders	Kat Slater	Regular role	
2007	A Class Apart	Candy Jerome	Television film	
2007	Miss Marie Lloyd	Marie Lloyd	Television film	
2007	The Dinner Party	Jackie	Television film	
2008	Wild at Heart	Amy Kriel	Main role (season 3)	
2008	Strictly Come Dancing	Herself	Contestant (Series 6)	
2010	The Road to Coronation Street	Pat Phoenix	Television film	
2010	East Street	Kat Slater	Charity crossover between Coronation Street and EastEnders	
2017	Kat & Alfie: Redwater	Kat Slater	Main role	
2020	EastEnders: Secrets from the Square	Herself	Episode: "Kat and Stacey"	
2025	EastEnders: 40 Years on the Square	Herself	Interviewed guest	

== Awards and nominations ==
Year	Ceremony	Award	Work	Result	Ref.
2001	British Soap Awards	Sexiest Female	EastEnders	Nominated	
2001	British Soap Awards	Best Newcomer	EastEnders	Won	
2001	National Television Awards	Most Popular Newcomer	EastEnders	Won	
2001	Inside Soap Awards	Best Newcomer	EastEnders	Won	
2001	TV Quick and TV Choice Awards	Best Newcomer	EastEnders	Won	
2002	British Soap Awards	Best Actress	EastEnders	Nominated	
2002	British Soap Awards	Best Dramatic Performance	EastEnders	Nominated	
2002	British Soap Awards	Hero of the Year	EastEnders	Nominated	
2002	British Soap Awards	Sexiest Female	EastEnders	Won	
2002	Inside Soap Awards	Best Actress	EastEnders	Nominated	
2002	Inside Soap Awards	Sexiest Female	EastEnders	Won	
2002	TV Quick and TV Choice Awards	Best Soap Actress	EastEnders	Nominated	
2002	National Television Awards	Most Popular Actress	EastEnders	Nominated	
2003	British Soap Awards	Best Actress	EastEnders	Nominated	
2003	British Soap Awards	Sexiest Female	EastEnders	Won	
2003	TV Quick and TV Choice Awards	Best Soap Actress	EastEnders	Won	
2003	National Television Awards	Most Popular Actress	EastEnders	Won	
2003	Inside Soap Awards	Best Actress	EastEnders	Nominated	
2004	British Soap Awards	Best Actress	EastEnders	Nominated	
2004	British Soap Awards	Sexiest Female	EastEnders	Won	
2004	British Soap Awards	Best On-Screen Partnership (with Shane Richie)	EastEnders	Nominated	
2004	National Television Awards	Most Popular Actress	EastEnders	Nominated	
2004	Inside Soap Awards	Best Actress	EastEnders	Nominated	
2004	Inside Soap Awards	Best Couple (with Shane Richie)	EastEnders	Won	
2004	Inside Soap Awards	Sexiest Female	EastEnders	Nominated	
2004	TV Quick and TV Choice Awards	Best Soap Actress	EastEnders	Nominated	
2005	British Soap Awards	Best Actress	EastEnders	Nominated	
2005	British Soap Awards	Sexiest Female	EastEnders	Nominated	
2005	National Television Awards	Most Popular Actress	EastEnders	Nominated	
2006	British Soap Awards	Best Actress	EastEnders	Nominated	
2006	British Soap Awards	Best Exit (with Shane Richie)	EastEnders	Nominated	
2011	British Soap Awards	Best Actress	EastEnders	Won	
2011	British Soap Awards	Best On-Screen Partnership (with Shane Richie)	EastEnders	Won	
2011	All About Soap Bubble Awards	Best Actress	EastEnders	Won	
2011	TRIC Awards	TV Soap Personality	EastEnders	Won	
2011	TV Quick and TV Choice Awards	Best Soap Actress	EastEnders	Won	
2011	Inside Soap Awards	Best Actress	EastEnders	Won	
2011	BAFTA Awards	Best Supporting Actress	The Road to Coronation Street	Nominated	
2011	TV Times Awards	Favourite Soap Star	EastEnders	Nominated	
2012	National Television Awards	Outstanding Serial Drama Performance	EastEnders	Nominated	
2013	British Soap Awards	Best Actress	EastEnders	Nominated	
