= Bella Burge =

American-British music hall performer, boxing promoter and actress (1888–1967)

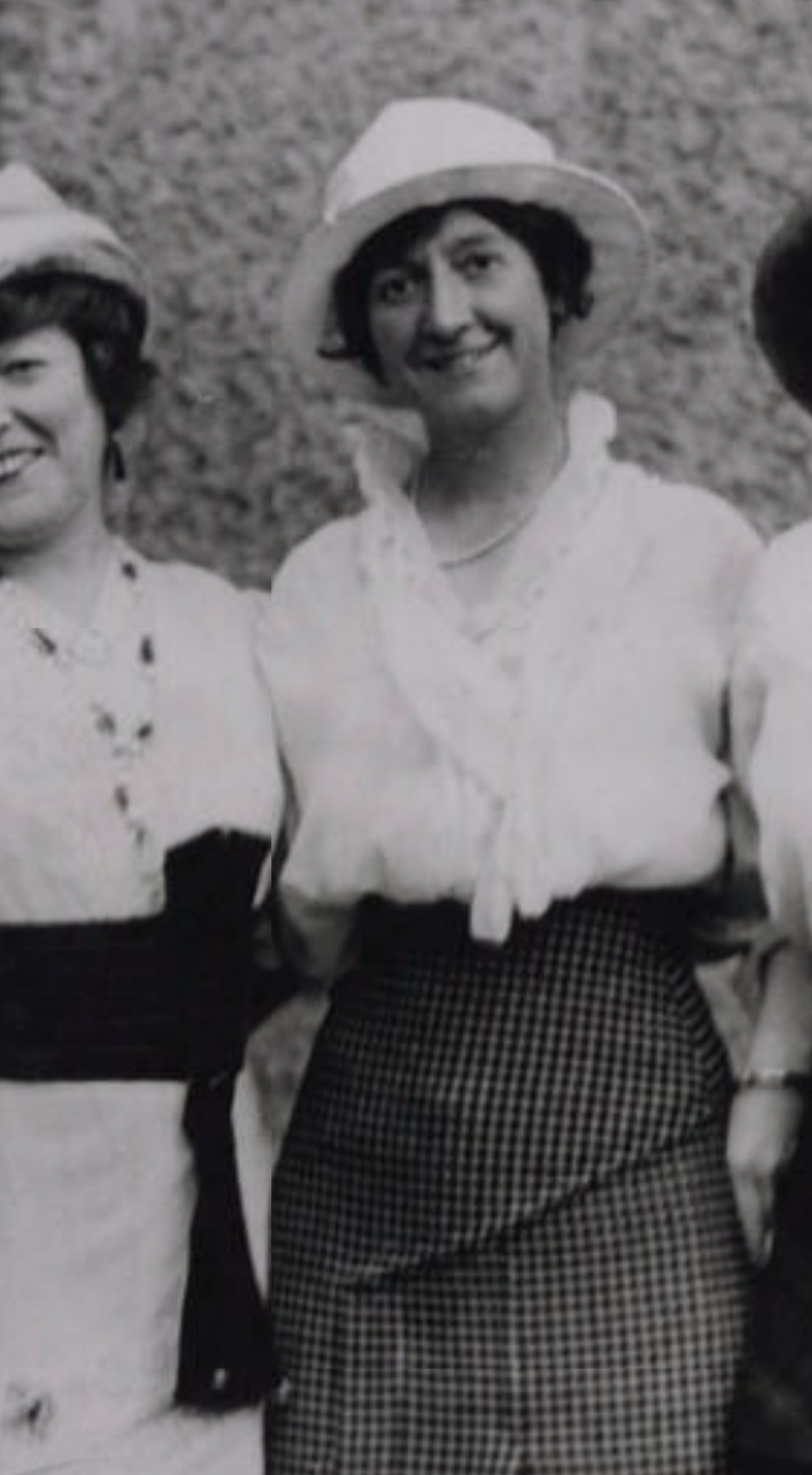
- Burge in 1910
- Born: Leah Belle Orchard; 29 September 1877; New York City, U.S.
- Died: 3 September 1962 (aged 84); Blackfriars, London, UK
- Resting place: Golders Green Crematorium
- Occupations: Actress; music hall performer; boxing promoter
- Years active: 1888–1961
- Spouse: Richard 'Dick' Burge (m. 1901)

Bella Burge (born Leah Belle Orchard; 29 September 1877 – 3 September 1962) was an American-born British music hall performer and actress and friend and colleague of Marie Lloyd and her sisters. Later in life she was the world's first female boxing promoter when she rang The Ring in London's Southwark. During this period she became known as "Bella of Blackfriars".

== Early life ==
She was born as Leah Belle Orchard to British parents in New York in 1877. After the death of her solicitor-father in 1882 when she was 4 years old she and her mother returned to Whitechapel in London's East End where she became known as "Bella" by her schoolfriends.

== Stage career and the Lloyds ==
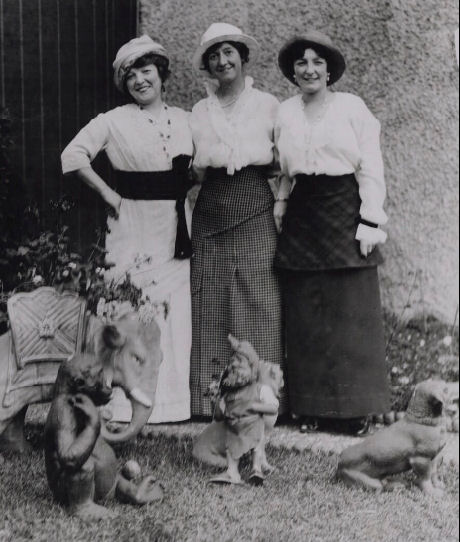
Marie Lloyd, Bella Burge and Marie Lloyd Jr.

At an early age she determined on a career in the music halls and made her first known appearance in 1888 aged 11 at the Pavilion Theatre, Whitechapel. Here she came to the notice of the Lloyd Sisters - Gracie and Alice - and in 1890 rented a room in the home of Marie Lloyd, at the same time acting as her theatrical dresser, touring the music halls with her. Lloyd's husband Percy Courtenay became jealous of his wife's close relationship with her young protégée, a contributing factor along with various others to the eventual breakdown of their marriage. Later, calling herself Bella Lloyd, Burge joined Marie Lloyd's sister Rosie in the act the Sisters Lloyd, while at the same time continuing to act as Marie's dresser, who was at the top of the same bill on which the Sisters Lloyd appeared. In 1889 Burge was on the same bill as Lloyd's other sisters Alice and Grace, who were starring in a Christmas pantomime at the Pavilion Theatre, Whitechapel. In 1907 Burge was a witness at the marriage of Marie Lloyd and Percy Courtenay's daughter Marie Courtenay (Marie Lloyd Jr.). Marie Lloyd and Burge remained close until Lloyd's death in 1922.

== Marriage ==
In June 1901 at the age of 24 she met Richard "Dick" Burge (1865—1918), a former professional boxer and English Lightweight Champion between 1891 and 1897 who had fought unsuccessfully for the World Lightweight Title in 1896 and who had also boxed for the English Middleweight and Heavyweight Crowns. He had retired from the ring in 1900, and after a whirlwind romance the two married in September 1901 at Brixton Register Office. Dick Burge quickly found himself in financial difficulties and to remedy this he made the mistake of joining the Liverpool Bank Fraud, a scheme which involved using the cash obtained from forged cheques to make high-stake bets at racecourses. The fraudulent scheme was quickly uncovered by the authorities, and having only been married for three weeks Dick Burge was arrested in October 1901 for his part in the fraud and received a sentence of 10 years with hard labour. Bella Burge returned to her former career in the music halls, appearing as Ella Lane, performing and saving as much of her salary as she could until her husband was released from prison in 1909.

== Boxing promoter ==
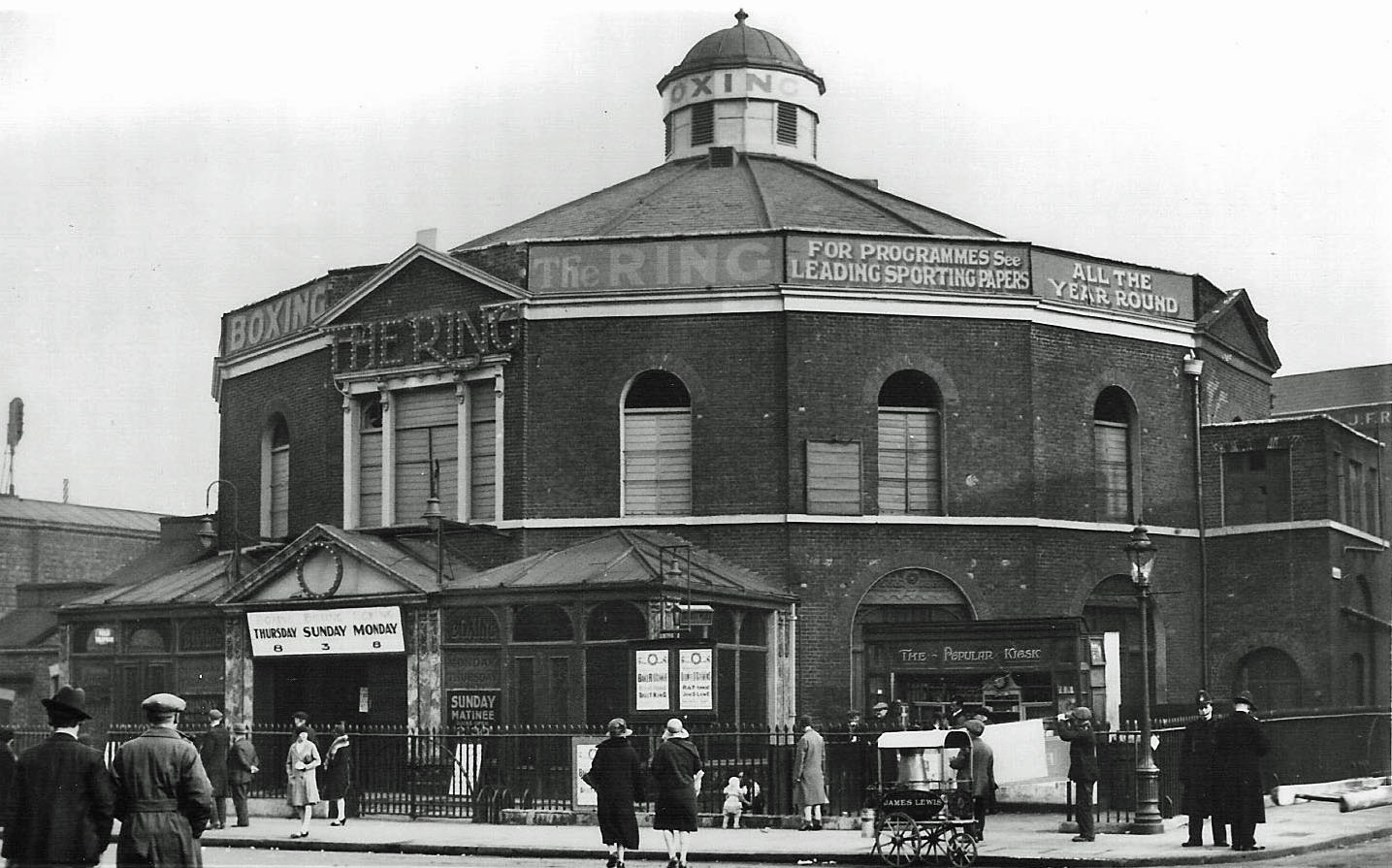
The Ring - the boxing venue opened by Dick and Bella Burge in 1910; it was destroyed by a German bomb in 1940

In May 1910 the two opened The Ring on Blackfriars Road in Southwark, the first boxing venue to charge prices within the pocket of the working classes. The Ring was in the by then derelict Surrey Chapel, a former chapel built in 1783 to a circular design by the Reverend Rowland Hill, who it is said chose the unusual design so that there would be no corners for the devil to hide in. Nevertheless, the building's circular design made it ideal for a boxing venue. For 30 years some of the biggest names in boxing from around the world competed here. In 1912 these included the Americans Frank Moran and "Battling" Jim Johnson, both of whom boxed Jack Johnson in World Heavyweight Title fights. In 1914 Bella Burge became the first woman to break the taboo of women attending boxing matches and soon her friend Marie Lloyd and other actresses became regular attendees at bouts.

In 1915 during World War I Dick Burge enlisted in the 1st Surrey Rifles, leaving Bella to manage their boxing business alone. Later transferring to the Military Police, he died of pneumonia in the Spanish flu epidemic on 15 March 1918, and after his death Bella continued to manage The Ring, maintaining its reputation as London’s leading fight venue for twenty years after her husband's death. At first she worked with Ted Pritchard, her late husband’s business partner, and after his death in 1925 she appointed Dan Sullivan as general manager, a boxing promoter with links to the London-based mobster Charles Sabini. In 1928 the Prince of Wales, later to become King Edward VIII, requested for a boxing contest to be arranged at The Ring between Jack Hood and Len Johnson. The Prince was very interested in boxing and had a desire to visit The Ring, so the bout was specially arranged for his visit. Her association with Sullivan caused her great financial difficulties and brought her to the brink of bankruptcy, and after his departure she worked with Victor Berliner during the 1930s. From 1932, no longer being able to compete with the boxing promotions of Jack Solomons, Burge changed the use of The Ring into a venue for wrestling and live theatre.

== Later years ==
Burge as the subject of This Is Your Life (1958)

Bella Burge continued to run and manage the Ring until it was destroyed in October 1940 during the Blitz. She is believed to be the world's first female boxing promoter. As such, in 1958 Bella Burge was the subject of an episode of This Is Your Life, a series hosted by Eamonn Andrews. Among the studio guests was Marie Lloyd Jr.

Her biography, Bella of Blackfriars by Leslie Bell, was published by Odhams Press, London in 1961.

Bella Burge died in Blackfriars in London in 1962 aged 84. She was cremated at Golders Green Crematorium where her ashes are held in a marble urn with those of her husband.

A play based on her life, Bella – Queen of the Blackfriars Ring, was performed at the Unity Theatre in Liverpool in 2014.
