= Bernard Dillon =

Irish jockey (1888–1941)

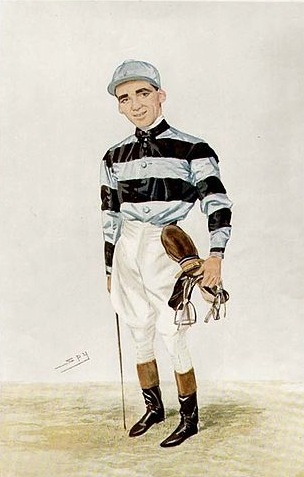
- Born: Caherina; 1888
- Died: 1941 (aged 52–53)
- Occupation: jockey

Bernard Dillon (1888–1941) was an Irish jockey. Born at Caherina in Tralee, he joined his older brother Joe in 1901, both of them being apprentice jockeys at the famous Druids Lodge training establishment in Wiltshire England. Victory on Lemberg in the 1910 Epsom Derby was his most famous achievement, although he also rode winners in the 1,000 Guineas (Flair, 1906 and Electra, 1909), Lincoln (Uninsured, 1904), Cambridgeshire (Hacklers Pride, 1905), Eclipse Stakes (Lally, 1907 and dead heated on Lemberg in 1910), Coronation Cup (Pretty Polly, 1906) and the Grand Prix de Paris (Spearmint, 1906).

Dillon became the third husband of the Music Hall star Marie Lloyd. They met in 1910 and caused a scandal when, travelling together as "Mr. and Mrs. Dillon" in 1913, she was refused entry to the United States for "moral turpitude". Alec Hurley, Lloyd's true husband at the time, died two months later, and Dillon and Lloyd were married at the British Consulate in Portland, Oregon, on 21 February 1914.

During World War I, Dillon served in the transport lines at Belton Park, Grantham, the Machine Gun Corps training depot. He was not a good soldier, and was often in trouble. However, Marie Lloyd would travel to Grantham to upbraid any officer who had punished her husband. These officers would often go missing when she arrived.

After the war, Dillon began drinking heavily and abusing Lloyd, so that she began drinking as her own escape. In 1920, they separated, but Lloyd continued to slide downhill until she collapsed on stage in October 1922, dying three days later.

He was portrayed by actor Tom Payne in the 2007 BBC drama Miss Marie Lloyd - Queen of The Music Hall.

Bernard Dillon, nicknamed as "Ben" in the horseracing community, died in London in May 1941.

In 2024 a book was written by Stephen Fernane about Bernard's life. 'The Life and Times of Bernard Dillon: The Narie that Won the Derby' is a compelling account of Bernard's turbulent life. For the first time, Bernard's racing triumphs are researched in detail. The book also covers the tragic demise of one of Edwardian England's most famous jockeys. The book is available at: www.buythebook.ie/bernarddillon
