= Naomi Jacob =

English writer and actress (1884–1964)

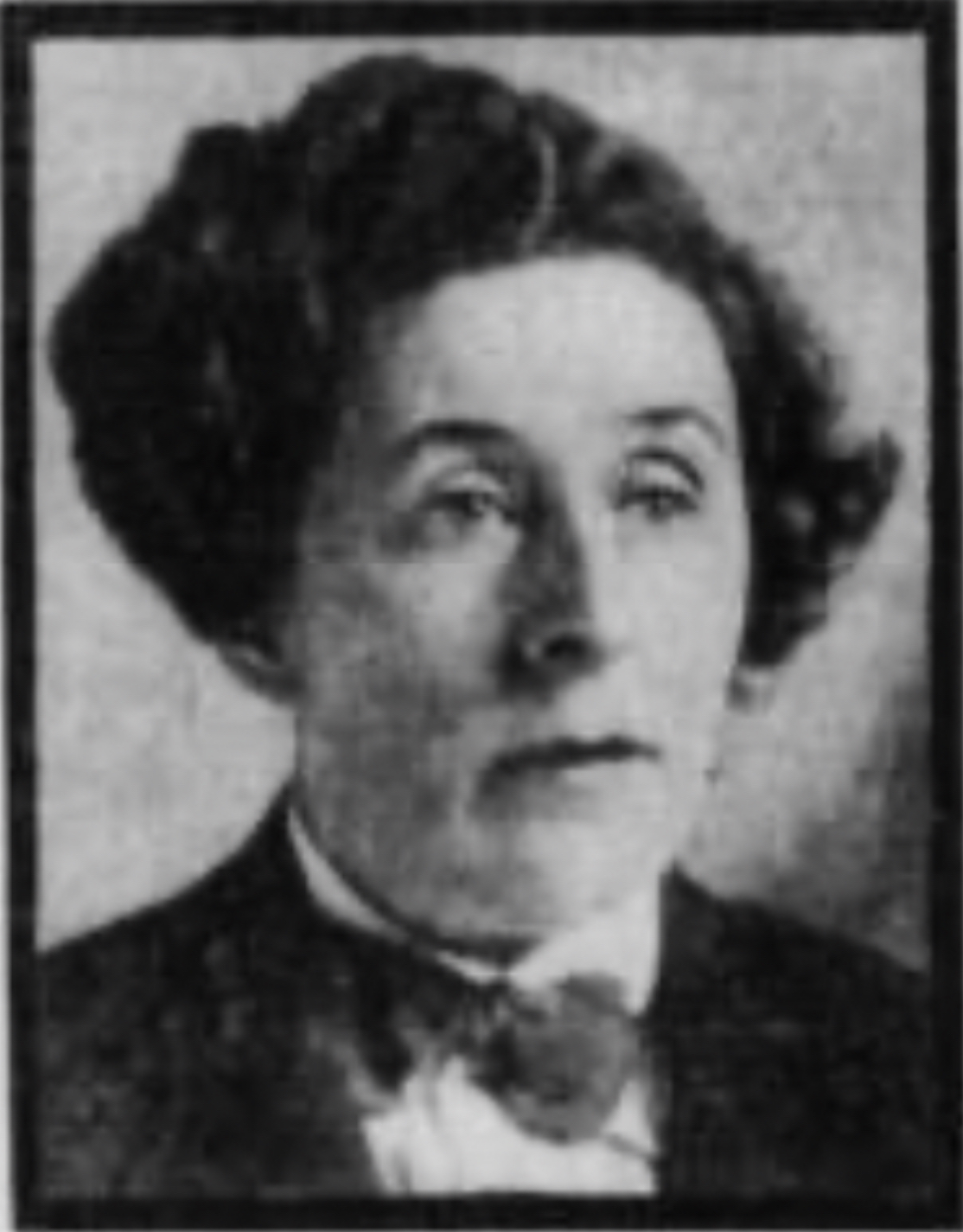
- Born: Naomi Eleanor Clare Ellington Jacob; 1 July 1884; Ripon, Yorkshire, England
- Died: 27 August 1964 (aged 80); Sirmione, Lombardy, Italy
- Occupations: Writer, actress
- Writing career
- Pen name: Ellington Gray

Naomi Eleanor Clare Ellington Jacob (1 July 1884 – 27 August 1964), also known by the pen name Ellington Gray, was an English writer, actress, and broadcaster. She was also a suffragist, worked for the Entertainments National Service Association and served as an Officer in the Women's Legion.

== Biography ==
=== Early life ===
Naomi Jacob was born on 1 July 1884 in Ripon in the West Riding of Yorkshire, the first daughter of Selina Sara "Nina" Ellington Collinson and Samuel Jacob.

Jacob's father served as headmaster of the Ripon Grammar School, where her mother also worked as teacher. Her maternal grandfather, Robert Ellington Collinson, was a mayor of the town and owner of The Unicorn Hotel in Ripon, where the Prince of Wales once stayed. Her great-grandfather Thomas was the second chief police officer in Ripon. Her father was the son of a Jewish refugee from Prussia, but rejected his Jewish ancestry. Nonetheless, Jacob was much attached to her Yiddish-speaking paternal grandfather, a tailor, who maintained Jewish traditions, and she later proudly drew attention to her Jewishness.

=== Career ===
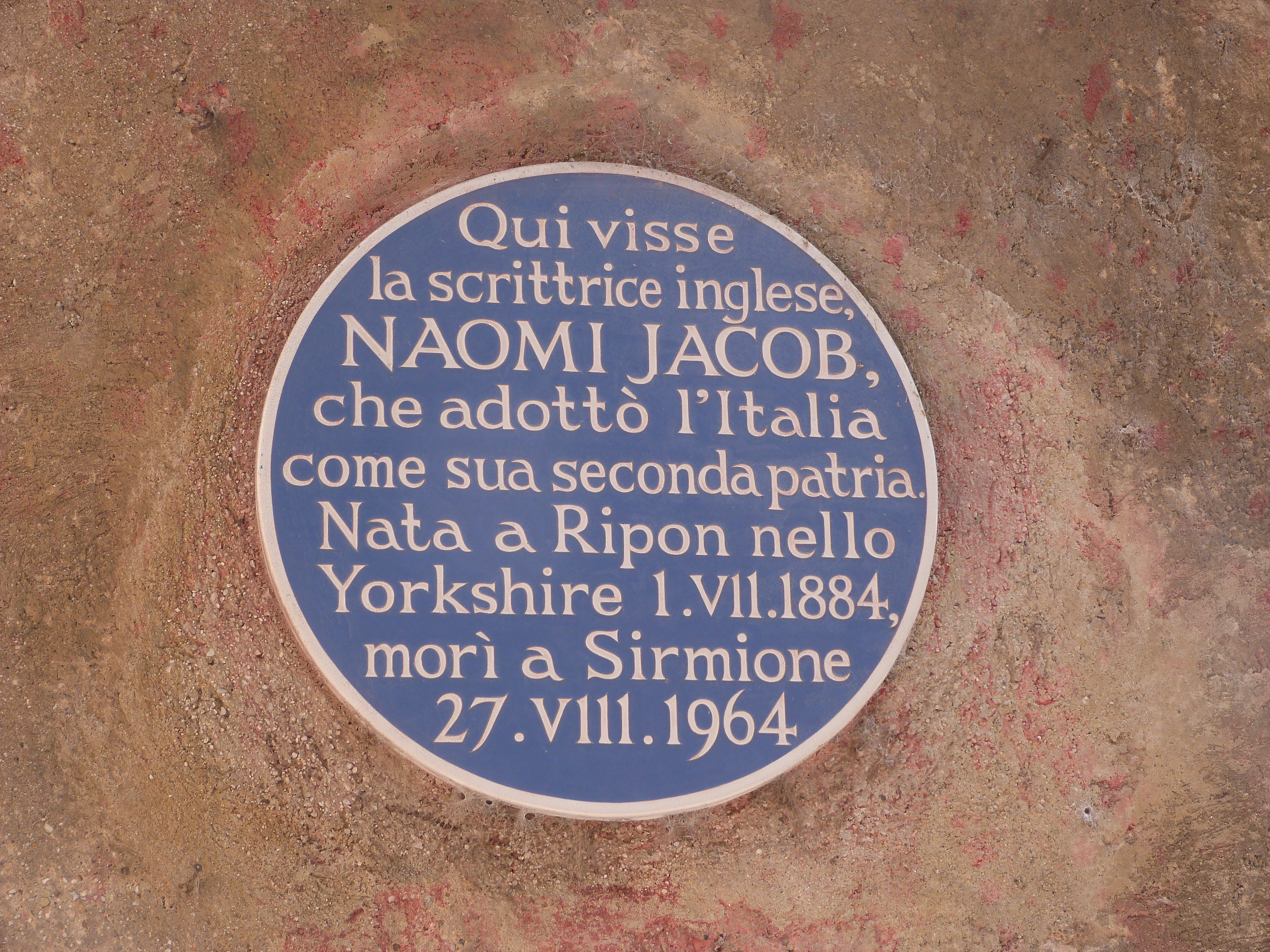
Naomi Jacob blue plaque

After her parents' divorce, Jacob left for Middlesbrough to complete her education and work as a student teacher. She soon left the teaching profession, however, to become an actress in revue. Around the same time, she contracted tuberculosis, a condition that was to affect her for the rest of her life. With physical activity becoming more difficult, Jacob channelled her creative efforts into writing. Jacob wrote non-fiction, biographies, and newspaper articles, as well as a number of novels, such as the Gollantz Saga and Wind on the Heath. Her mother also became a novelist, publishing under the name Nina Abbott.

Jacob had a strong circle of friends, including Marguerite Broadfoote, Radclyffe Hall, "Little Tich", Marie Lloyd, and Bransby Williams. She was also active politically, standing as a Labour parliamentary candidate and becoming involved with the women's suffrage movement. She later became a member of the Conservative Party.

Her novels often tackle the issue of prejudice against Jews, domestic violence, and the political consequences of pogroms in the 19th century. Many of these books were written before the Second World War and were based on the experiences of her paternal family, who had escaped violence in Western Prussia. She also wrote about the Yorkshire people and landscape in her works.

=== Later life ===
Jacob moved to Lake Garda in 1930 because the weather was kinder to her lungs. A blue plaque is erected in her honour in Sirmione, where she lived. She was well known in the town and her home was known as Casa Micky.

During the Second World War Jacob returned to the UK to help in the war effort. She worked for Entertainments National Service Association (ENSA) producing morale-boosting broadcasts and live performances for the troops. In early 1944 she was in Sicily when the American forces offered new clothes to the ENSA troupe there. Hermione Baddeley, one of the British entertainers, "went for a fitting and who should I find with a tape measure in her hand but the well-known British writer Naomi Jacob. God knows how she had got there, but she was a very important creature indeed, probably a major-general at least. Naomi was a very large lady with well-known preferences and she took a long time over my fitting, but the result was wonderful."

She returned to Italy, and died in Sirmione on 27 August 1964.

=== Personal life ===
Jacob had a number of female lovers. She did not address lesbianism in her fiction.

== Filmography ==
- The First Born (1928)
- Glamour (1931)

== Bibliography ==
=== Standalone novels ===
- The Plough (1928)
- The Man Who Found Himself (1929)
- The Beloved Physician (1930)
- Seen Unknown... (1930)
- Roots (1931)
- Props (1932)
- Groping (1933)
- Poor Straws (1933)
- Honour Come Back (1935)
- The Loaded Stick (1935)
- Barren Metal (1936)
- The Lenient God (1936)
- Time Piece (1936)
- Fade Out (1937)
- No Easy Way (1938)
- Straws in Amber (1938)
- Full Meridian (1939)
- The Porcelain Clay (1939)
- Susan Crowther (1940)
- They Left the Land (1940)
- The Cap of Youth (1941)
- Under New Management (1941)
- Leopards and Spots (1942)
- White Wool (1943)
- Honour's a Mistress (1946)
- A Passage Perilous (1947)
- Mary Of Delight (1949)
- Every Other Gift (1950)
- The Heart of the House (1950)
- A Late Lark Singing (1951)
- Just About Us (1953)
- The Morning Will Come (1953)
- Second Harvest (1953)
- Antonia (1954)
- Irish Boy (1955)
- Prince China (1955)
- Tales Of the Broad Acres (1955)
- Wind on the Heath (1956)
- What's To Come (1958)
- Search for a Background (1960)
- Three Men and Jennie (1960)
- Strange Beginning (1961)
- Great Black Oxen (1962)
- Yolanda (1963)
- Long Shadows (1964)
- Flavia (1965)

=== The Gollantz Saga ===
- The Founder of The House (1925)
- That Wild Lie (1930)
- Young Emmanuel (1932)
- Four Generations (1934)
- Private Gollantz (1942)
- Gollantz: London, Paris, Milan (1948)
- Gollantz and Partners (1958)
