= Laura Ormiston Chant =

English social reformer (1848–1923)

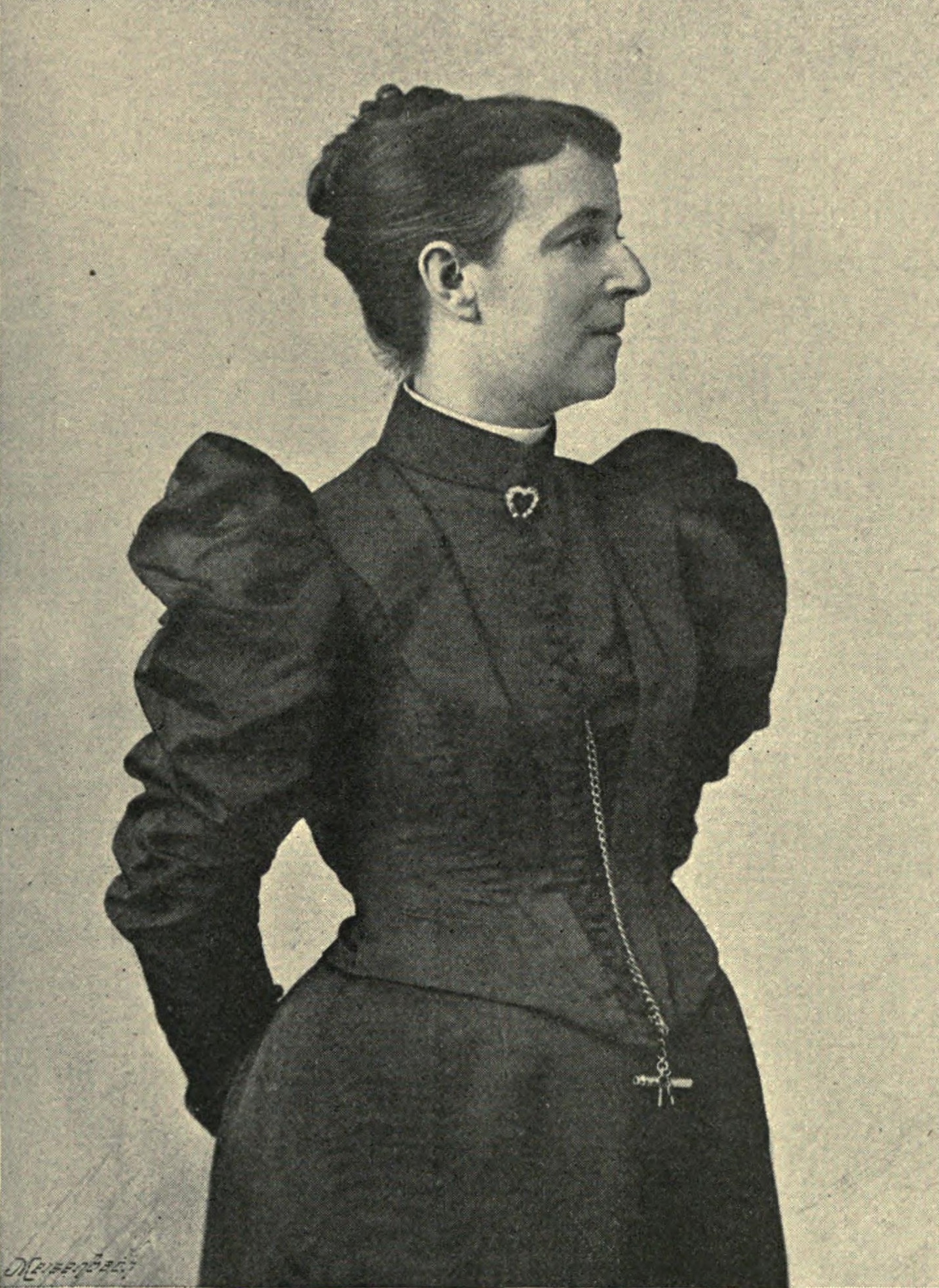
Chant in 1890

Laura Ormiston Chant (née Dibbin; 9 October 1848 – 16 February 1923) was an English social reformer, women's rights activist, and writer.

== Life ==
Chant was born Laura Ormiston Dibbin on 9 October 1848, in Woolaston, Gloucestershire, the daughter of Francis William Dibbin (1811–1874), a civil engineer and Sophia Ormiston (1815–1894), who managed a girls institution. In 1871, she was a governess and eventually went on to pursue a career in nursing. Her father did not approve of this profession and disowned her. She worked as a nursing sister in the Sophia Wards in the London Hospital.

At work Chant met and later married Thomas Chant, M.R.C.S., L.S.A., of Bridgwater on 13 September 1877 in Capel, Surrey, England. They had four children: Thomas, Emmeline, Olive and Ethel Chant.

Laura Chant wrote and lectured on social purity, temperance, and women's rights. Her contemporaries called her "a helper of many." Her published works include pamphlets, hymns, a novel and a book of poetry and are described as reflecting "many of the tensions characterizing feminism of the late nineteenth and early twentieth centuries". One of her most famous reform efforts was her protesting of music-halls as temptations to vice in 1894.

Chant died in Banbury, Oxfordshire, 16 February 1923 from a cerebral hemorrhage and heart failure.

== Career ==
=== Nursing ===
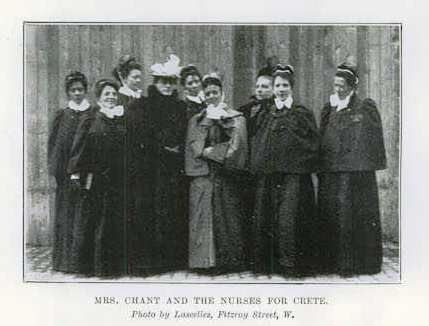
Mrs. Laura Ormiston Chant and companions en route for Greece The Sketch 14 April 1897

Nursing was Laura Chant's first major career. She worked in the London Hospital but was dismissed when she married Thomas Chant as it was against their rules. She was also an assistant manager of a private lunatic asylum. On 8 April 1897 Chant and six other English nurses went to Crete to give aid and supplies during the Greco-Turkish War. She received the "Red Cross of Greece" from the royal family of Greece because of these efforts. She went to Bulgaria to give aid to Armenian refugees from the 1894–1896 Hamidian massacres.

=== Social reform ===
==== The Empire Theatre ====
One of the most prominent causes Chant was involved in was her protest of the Empire Theatre of Varieties in Leicester Square. Chant shared in her pamphlet Why We Attacked the Empire that she was astonished by the immorality taking place in this theatre during their performances. She went to visit the theatre and observed many women who came to the promenade (an open space for people to walk around but still view the performance) to prostitute. She also believed that the clothing and the themes in these performances were immoral.

Chant attended the 10 October 1894 licensing meeting of the London County Council for the renewal of the Empire Theatre and explained the immorality occurring in the theatre. She gave a long speech detailing her grievances before the final decision by the committee was made. The license was renewed on 26 October 1894, but contingent on the promenade in the theatre being taken away and that no intoxicating drinks would be sold in the auditorium. Screens were placed around the promenade in the theatre but were eventually pulled down by protestors, who included the young Winston Churchill. They thought the restrictions were too hard on legitimate socialising. Chant was made fun of in the popular music hall ballad "Her Golden Hair Was Hanging Down Her Back".

Her work to reform the theatre was a catalyst to future discussions on the injustices in the music halls. Chant's reform efforts are considered one of the major factors that preceded the Music Hall Strike of 1907 in London. During this strike, theatre workers protested the lack of pay to match the time demands of increasing working hours.

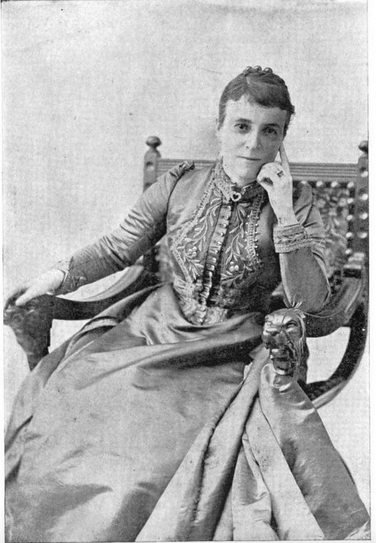
Laura Ormiston Chant

==== Organisations ====
- International Council of Women (1888) Chant traveled to the United States to represent England in this women's rights council. During the convention, Susan B. Anthony said in her opening remarks to the council that she admired Chant's poem in Verona and Other Poems titled "England to America."
- Social Purity Alliance
- Founding member of the National Vigilance Association which focused enforcement of the Criminal Law Amendment Act 1885 which outlawed brothels and prostitution. She was the editor of the journal The Vigilance Record which was published by the NVA.
- Vice-president of the Peace Society
- Chant was a founding member of the Women Guardians Society.
- Ladies National Association
- Women's Liberal Federation
- British Women's Temperance Association
- Vice-president of the Women's Vegetarian Union

=== Public speaker and author ===
Chant traveled around the United Kingdom, Canada and the United States of America and many other countries to give speeches about temperance and other moral causes. She was known for making her audience laugh or be brought tears with her moving words about the various topics she spoke about.

She spoke about temperance to the Unitarian Church Temperance Society in Boston, United States on 30 May 1890 in a speech titled "How I Became a Total Abstainer." She spoke about how alcohol poisons the brain and "as humanity advances in culture and development, the need of brain-power is greater."

Chant was also known for her speeches as a nondenominational Christian preacher. In 1893 Chant addressed the 1893 Parliament of the World's Religions, held in Chicago in conjunction with the Columbian Exposition. Her speech was titled, "The Real Religion of Today." In this sermon she shared the importance of appreciating and respecting the many religions that were created to worship God.

She also wrote the words and music for Action Songs for Children and several more volumes of music in the same vein, consisting of simple ditties embodying physical exercises for small children.

== Selected works ==
- Verona and Other Poems (1877)
- Why We Attacked the Empire (1894)
- Women and the Streets
- Sellcuts' Manager (1899)

== See also ==
- Lucy Stone
- Julia Ward Howe
