= Alice Lloyd (actress) =

British music hall artist (1873–1949)

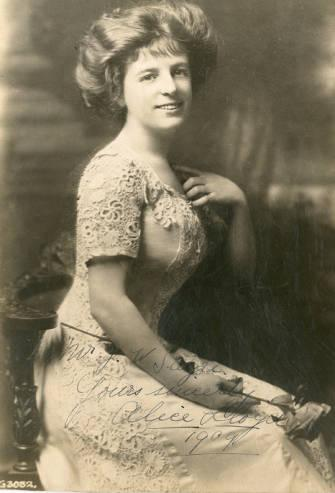
- Born: Alice Wood; 20 October 1873; Hoxton, Middlesex, England
- Died: 17 November 1949 (aged 76); Banstead, Surrey, England
- Occupations: Music hall and vaudeville singer and entertainer

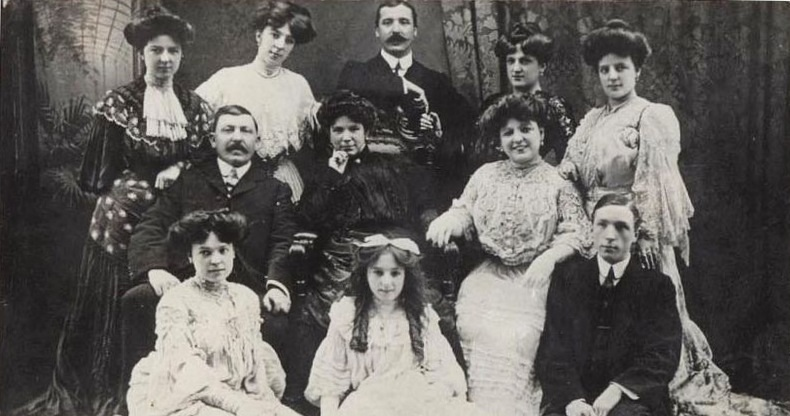
The Wood family, from left to right: Top row: Daisy, Rosie, John, Grace, Alice. Middle: John Wood (father), Matilda (mother), Marie. Bottom: Annie, Maud, Sydney

Alice Wood (20 October 1873 – 17 November 1949), known professionally as Alice Lloyd or Alice Hall, was a British music hall artist who was also popular in American vaudeville. She was the younger sister of Marie Lloyd.

== Life and career ==
Lloyd was born in Hoxton, London into the Wood family that included her elder celebrity sister Marie, who adopted the name Marie Lloyd. There were ten children and many of them adopted the name Lloyd to appear in the music hall. From 1888, Marie, Alice and Grace appeared as the "Sisters Lloyd".

Her sister Marie Lloyd was popular in Britain, and it was said that, when in 1907 an American theatre owner, Percy G. Williams signed up Alice via his agents, he mistakenly thought he had contracted Marie. However, Alice became successful in the United States, and it was claimed that her name was placed in lights of the theatre straight after her first performance.

She "quickly became virtually a resident of the American vaudeville stage". It was said that Marie was too coarse for American audiences and they preferred the more restrained Alice. Alice acted more demurely than Marie and tailored her act for American audiences, incorporating more sentimental songs and dressing attractively.

In 1908 she was on the ocean liner RMS Mauretania when a broken propeller damaged the ship. It was reported that Alice sang for an hour to calm the passengers whilst power was restored to the vessel. In 1909 she appeared in Seattle in her first tour of western America.

She toured the United States in 1912, playing cities in Montana, including Butte, where her friend, feminist writer Mary MacLane, published two detailed feature articles in the local press about their friendship and Alice's visit to Butte with her daughter Alice and performing sidekick Grace Field.

When, in 1913, both sisters appeared in competing theatres on opposite sides of Times Square in Manhattan, "there was little question among critics and audiences as to which was the bigger draw."

Alice Lloyd returned to American vaudeville in 1919 after a three-year break, and again in 1925 after another break for a world tour during which her sister Marie and her husband, actor Tom McNaughton, both died. She recorded for Victor Records and remained a popular attraction in the U.S., but returned to England for the final time in 1928 after losing much of her money in the Wall Street crash.

She lived in Banstead, Surrey, which became a centre of family activities. In 1933, Alice and other family members took part in a theatre tour in Britain, Memories of Marie. She also took part in a revue, These Stars Made Variety, in the late 1930s with Hetty King and Ada Reeve. During the Second World War, she performed in another revue, Black Velvet, and played in a pantomime with her sister Rosie Lloyd in 1944.

She died at home in Banstead in 1949, at the age of 76.
