= Alec Hurley =

English music hall singer (1871–1913)

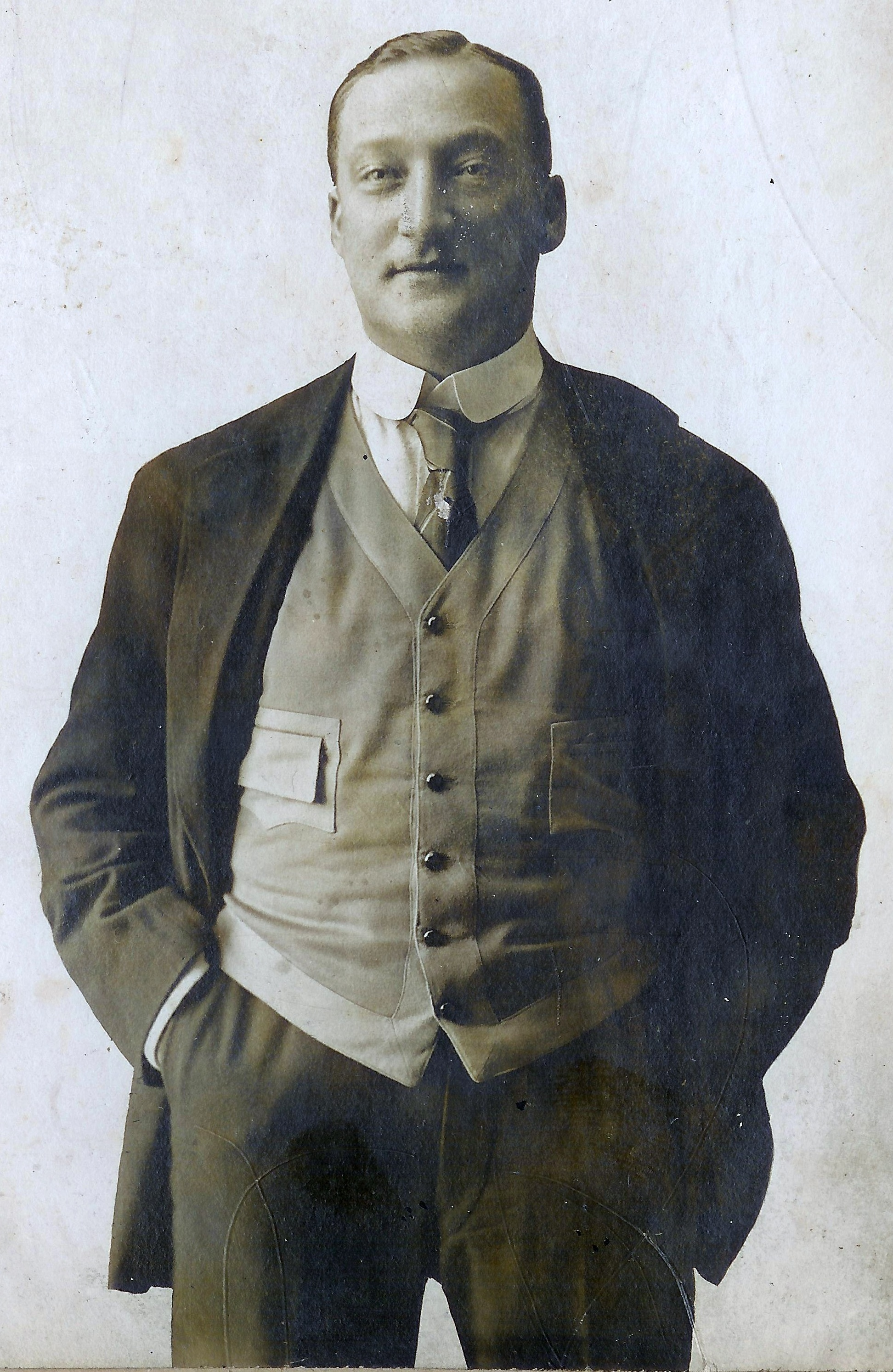
- c. 1910
- Born: Alexander Hurley; 24 March 1871; Hackney, London, England
- Died: 6 December 1913 (aged 42); Hampstead, London
- Occupation: Singer
- Years active: 1891–1910

Alexander Hurley (24 March 1871 – 6 December 1913) was an English music hall singer, and Marie Lloyd's second husband.

Born in London, Hurley began a boxing career, during which he would perform a song entitled "The Strongest Man on Earth" after his fights. He started performing in London music halls, and became known to his audiences as a "coster" singer, similar to Gus Elen and Albert Chevalier. Hurley supported many popular acts, including Marie Lloyd, whom he married in 1906. Hurley supported Lloyd in all of her performances until the marriage broke up and he stopped performing.

== Early years ==
Hurley was born in Hackney, London, and was one of two sons to an Irish Sea captain. He made his music hall stage debut in 1882, singing Irish songs. After appearing briefly in a double act with his brother, Hurley started work as a tea packer at London's docklands and began to exercise excessively in his spare time. His new fitness capabilities allowed him to take up boxing. During his time as a boxer, he would regularly perform the song "The Strongest Man on Earth" by Edward Roden and F. F. Venton after fights.

== Singing career ==
Singing interested Hurley and he began to perform "The Strongest Man on Earth" on the music hall circuit. He found his niche as a "coster" singer and entertainer, and was likened to Albert Chevalier, though Hurley performed "with more realism and less histrionics", and "eschewed all the raucousness of the music hall". His most famous performance was "The Lambeth Walk", written by E. W. Rogers. The song was Hurley's version of the cakewalk, a popular dance craze at the time, and was not connected to the later Noel Gay song of the same title.

== Marriage to Marie Lloyd ==
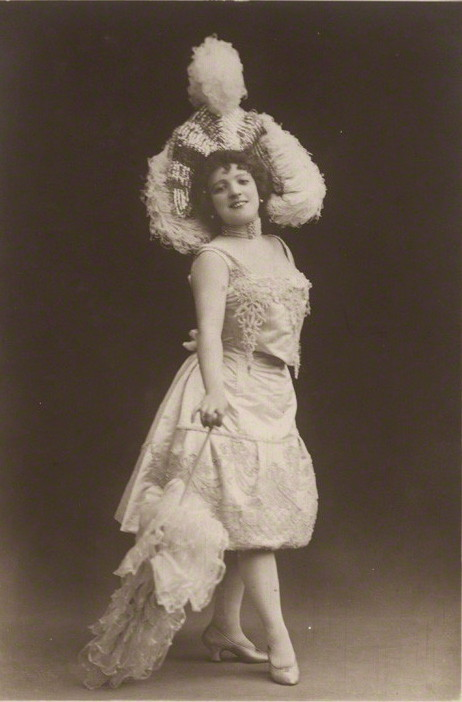
Marie Lloyd, whom Hurley married in 1906

He met the music hall singer Marie Lloyd in 1901 and went on a tour of Australia with her and several other music hall acts. They opened at Harry Rickards Opera House in Melbourne on 18 May with "The Lambeth Walk". By the time they returned to England they were lovers and moved in together in Southampton Row. Aside from his coster performances, Hurley also musically supported his wife.

Lloyd and Hurley married on 27 October 1906. The marriage, although initially happy, became strained early on when work separated them for long periods. Fresh from his success in Australia, Hurley began feeling sidelined by his wife's popularity in England. Despite getting the date of the marriage wrong, the author Walter MacQueen-Pope suggested that "[Hurley] was a star who had married a planet. Already the seeds of disaster were being sown." Hurley soon became estranged from his wife, who had begun drinking and gambling heavily. During one outing to the races, she met the jockey Bernard Dillon, whom she moved in with, leaving Alec to tour alone. Furious, Hurley initiated divorce proceedings, the strain of which caused him to drink heavily, which signalled the end of his theatrical career.

== Last years and death ==
Hurley was declared bankrupt in 1911 owing to his "lavish gifts for friends and gambling habits". He died within a week of being diagnosed with pneumonia at Jack Straw's Castle, Hampstead, on 6 December 1913, aged 42. He was buried in Tower Hamlets Cemetery in east London.

== Recognition ==
His song " 'Arry 'Arry 'Arry" was voted the tenth best music hall song.

== Sources ==
- Farson, Daniel (1972). Marie Lloyd and Music Hall. London: Tom Stacey Ltd. ISBN 978-0-85468-082-5.
- Gillies, Midge (1999). Marie Lloyd: The One And Only. London: Orion BooksLtd. ISBN 978-0-7528-4363-6.
- Jacob, Naomi (1972). Our Marie, Marie Lloyd: A Biography. London: Chivers Press. ISBN 978-0-85594-721-7.
- Macqueen-Pope, Walter (2010). Queen of the Music Halls: Being the Dramatized Story of Marie Lloyd. London: Nabu Press. ISBN 978-1-171-60562-1.
