= Champagne Charlie =

Champagne Charlie may refer to:

== People ==
- Charles Townshend (1725–1767), British politician nicknamed "Champagne Charlie"
- Charles Heidsieck (1820–1871), French Champagne merchant who was nicknamed "Champagne Charlie"
- George Leybourne (1842–1884), introduced the song "Champagne Charlie" to the London music hall
- Lord Carrington (1843–1928), British Liberal politician and aristocrat, dubbed "Champagne Charlie" by the press
- Charlie Magri (born 1956), British boxer nicknamed "Champagne Charlie"
- Charles Kennedy (1959–2015), 1999–2006 leader of the UK Liberal Democrats, dubbed "Champagne Charlie" by the press
- Charlie Nicholas (born 1961), Scottish footballer nicknamed "Champagne Charlie"

== The arts ==
- "Champagne Charlie" (song), an 1867 music hall song by George Leybourne and Alfred Lee
- Champagne Charlie (1936 film), a 1936 American film with no relation to the song
- Champagne Charlie (1944 film), a 1944 British musical film about the 1860s London music hall rivalry between performers George Leybourne and Alfred Vance
- Champagne Charlie (album), a 1978 album by American singer Leon Redbone
- Champagne Charlie (miniseries), a 1989 French-Canadian drama television miniseries about Charles Heidseick
- The Champagne Charlie Stakes, drama play by Bruce Graham
- Champagne Charlie and Pretty Jemima: Variety Theater in the Nineteenth Century (2010), Gillian M Rodger; Series: Music in American Life; University of Illinois Press;
