= Wilton's Music Hall =

Music hall in Whitechapel, Tower Hamlets, London, England

- 1828 Prince of Denmark Public House; 1839 Mahogany Bar; 1878 Frederick's Royal Palace of Varieties
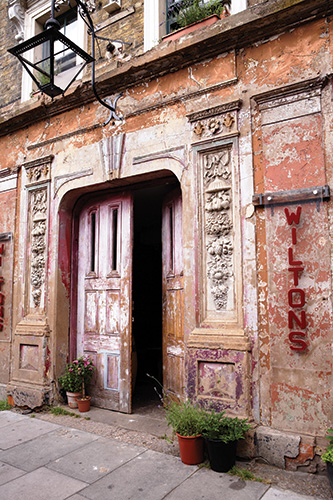
- The entrance to Wilton's Music Hall on Graces Alley
- Interactive map of Wilton's Music Hall
- Address: Graces Alley, Cable Street; Tower Hamlets, London
- Coordinates: 51.510680°N 0.066930°W
- Owner: Wilton's Music Hall Trust
- Capacity: 300 hall and gallery
- Type: Saloon music hall
- Designation: Grade II* listed
- Current use: Theatre

Construction
- Opened: 1859
- Rebuilt: 1878 J. Buckley Wilson; 1979–89 Peter Newson
- Years active: 1859 – 1888; 1999 – present
- Architect: Jacob Maggs

Website
- www.wiltons.org.uk

Wilton's Music Hall is a Grade II* listed building, built as a music hall and now run as a multi-arts performance space in Graces Alley, off Cable Street in the Shadwell area of the London Borough of Tower Hamlets. It is one of very few surviving music halls of the East End of London and retains many original features.

Wilton's has been a producing venue since 2004. It presents a diverse and programme including opera, puppetry, classical music, cabaret, dance, and magic. It is a focus for theatrical and East End history, as well as a living theatre, concert hall, public bar and heritage site.

The venue underwent an extensive programme of restoration work from 2012 to 2015. The theatre did not close during the building works, instead running an interim arts programme called The Chrysalis Club. The award-winning spaces reopened in October 2015.

== Architecture ==
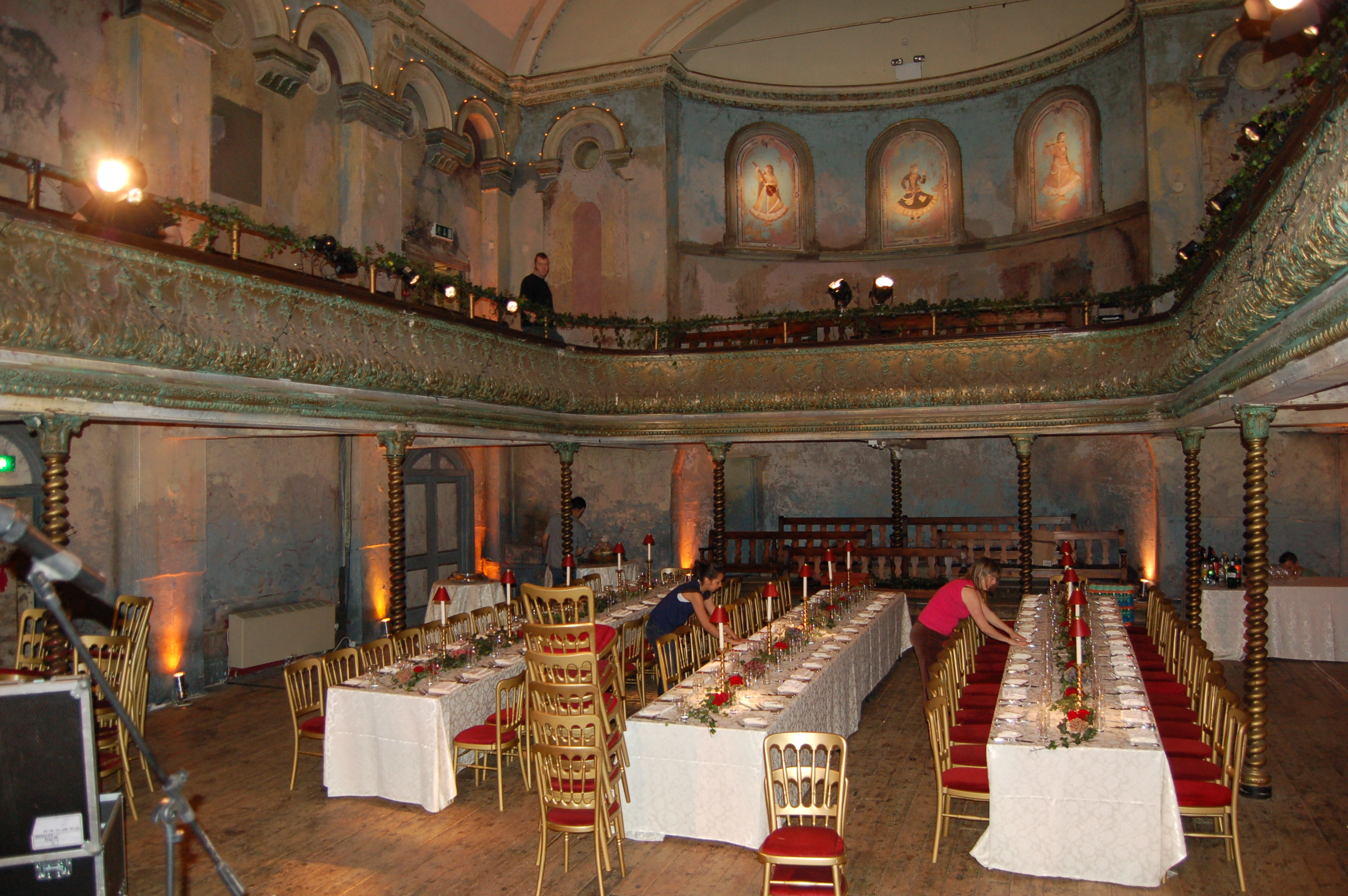
The interior of Wilton's being set for a wedding. The lines of tables give some idea of how it was used as a supper club.

The theatre is a rare surviving example of the "giant pub hall". In the theatre, a single gallery, on three sides and supported by "barley sugar" cast iron pillars, rises above a large rectangular hall and a high stage with a proscenium arch. In its heyday, a "sun-burner" chandelier of 300 gas jets and 27,000 cut crystals, illuminated a mirrored hall. Today, charring is still visible in the rafters, where the chimney exhausted the heat of this massive device. The hall would have had space for supper tables, a benched area, and promenades around the outside for standing customers.

Wilton's was modelled on many other successful London halls of the time, including the second Canterbury Hall (1854) in Lambeth, Evans Music-and-Supper Rooms (1856) in Covent Garden, and Weston's (1857) (later known as 'The Royal Holborn'). Wilton's remains the only surviving example.

== History ==
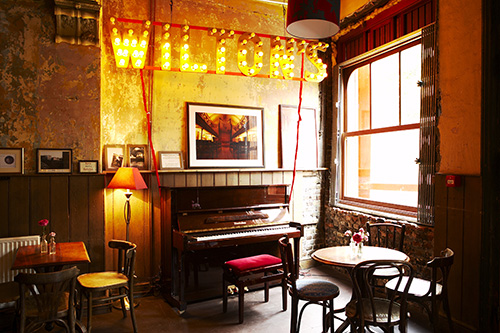
The Mahogany Bar at Wilton's Music Hall, 2010.

=== Origins ===
Wilton's is a unique building, comprising a mid-19th-century grand music hall attached to an 18th-century terrace of three houses and a pub. Originally an alehouse dating from 1743 or earlier, it may well have served the Scandinavian sea captains and wealthy merchants who lived in neighbouring Wellclose Square. From c. 1826, it was also known as The Mahogany Bar, reputedly because the landlord was the first to install a mahogany bar and fittings in his pub. In 1839 a concert room was built behind the pub and in 1843 it was licensed for a short time as The Albion Saloon, a saloon theatre, legally permitted to put on full-length plays. John Wilton bought the business in c. 1850, enlarged the concert room three years later, and replaced it with his 'Magnificent New Music Hall' in 1859.

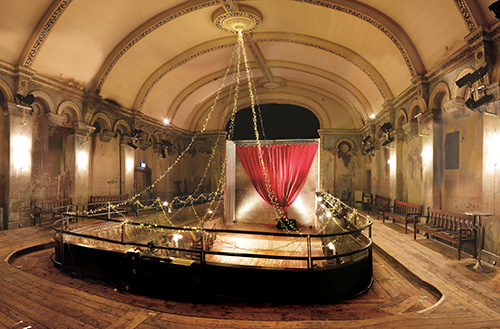
The view down onto the stage from the gallery of Wilton's Music Hall.

Wilton's was built by Jacob Maggs, on the same site as the former concert room of the Albion Saloon. The hall could accommodate 1,500 people, most of whom were working-class. The bar was retained as the public entrance, and the hall was built in the area behind the existing block of houses. This was common practice at the time, as street frontage for music halls was very expensive. He furnished the hall with mirrors, chandeliers and decorative paintwork, and installed the finest heating, lighting and ventilation systems of the day.

Madrigals, glees and excerpts from opera were at first the most important part of the entertainment, along with the latest attractions from West End and provincial halls, circus, ballet and fairground. In the thirty years Wilton's was a music hall, many of the best-remembered acts of early popular entertainment performed here, from George Ware who wrote "The Boy I Love is Up in the Gallery", to Arthur Lloyd and George Leybourne ("Champagne Charlie") two of the first music hall stars to perform for royalty.

=== Fire and Methodism ===
Wilton's passed into several ownerships during the 1870s before being destroyed by fire in 1877. An eight-year rebuild commenced that year, before the building was bought by the East End Mission of the Methodist Church. Towards the end of the 19th century, the East End had become notorious for extreme poverty and terrible living conditions. Religious organisations tried to help, such as the East London Methodist Mission, renamed The Mahogany Bar Mission and for some time considered 'Methodism's finest hall'.

During the Great Dock Strike of 1889, a soup kitchen was set up at The Mahogany Bar, feeding a thousand meals a day to the starving dockers' families. The Mission remained open for nearly 70 years, through some of the most testing periods in East End history, including the 1936 Mosley March and the London Blitz in World War II. Throughout that time, the Methodists campaigned against social abuses, welcomed people of all creeds and ethnicity, and gave invaluable support to the local community, particularly the needy children of the area.

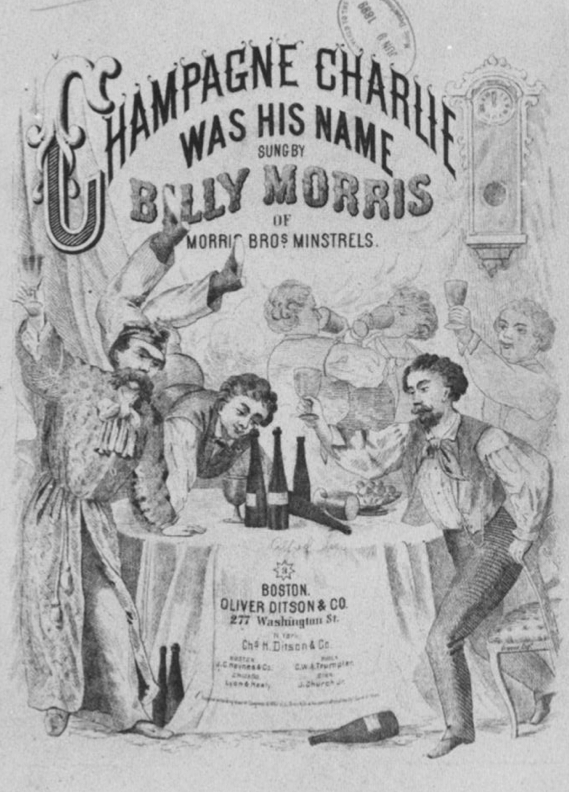
"Champagne Charlie", the song made famous by George Leybourne

=== 1950s–1990s ===
The church ceased in 1956, and Wilton's briefly became a rag storage warehouse. After the Second World War, the area was subject to local authority compulsory purchase as part of the slum clearance schemes of the 1960s. The Methodists had to leave and Wilton's was scheduled for demolition. A campaign was started to save the building with support from persons such as Sir John Betjeman, Peter Sellers and Spike Milligan. Wilton's was given the protection of Grade II* listed building status in April 1971, and was bought by the Greater London Council. The London Music Hall Trust was formed by solicitor Michael Shelton, to preserve it, but the GLC, under the leadership of Ken Livingstone, sold it to the Jacobs Island Company, along with some surrounding land.

The London Music Hall Trust, then chaired by Bernard Brook-Partridge, was able, with the considerable assistance of Brian Daubney, to intervene to persuade the local planning authority to make it a condition of development of the surrounding land that Jacobs Island Company donated the building to the Trust. The Trust was able to secure some £300,000 to make the building wind and watertight and preserve it until 1999 when it was leased to Broomhill Opera Company until 2004. Broomhill Opera produced two productions within the first 18 months, but then surrendered their lease to the Trust. Wilton's Music Hall Trust was then formed, and in 2001 the London Music Hall Trust donated the building to the new trust which has run it ever since.

=== 1990s rebirth ===
Wilton's reopened as a theatre and concert hall with a production of T. S. Eliot's The Waste Land, starring Fiona Shaw. In 1997, Frances Mayhew, former Managing and Artistic Director took over the building in 2004, having worked previously at Wilton's in the late 1990s as an intern. It was again derelict and in debt. In June 2007 the World Monuments Fund added the building to its list of the world's "100 most endangered sites".

Over the next decade Frances Mayhew and her team restored the building with a programme of arts and community activities and the reinstatement of The Mahogany Bar. The profile grew and in 2012, due to donations from SITA Trust, the Foundation for Sport and the Arts and other trusts and individuals, enough money was raised – just over £1m – to carry out the first half of a Capital Project to repair the building. This first half repaired the auditorium and in 2013, with support of Heritage Lottery Fund and other donors, Wilton's was able to raise the £2.6 million needed to begin part two of the project to repair the houses, numbers 1–4 Graces Alley and 17 Wellclose Square, which make up Wilton’s front of house. This included creating a new Learning and Participation Studio funded by the Aldgate and Allhallows Foundation. The project was completed in September 2015 leaving the building structurally secure – probably for the first time since the renovations of music hall days.

In carrying out the building work, a policy of "conservative repair" has been followed which means "retaining genuine historic fabric and avoiding misleading restoration, so that future generations can interpret the significance for themselves in their own way, based on the physical evidence". The work has been carried out by Fullers (Phase 1 – the Auditorium) and William Anelay (Phase 2 – the Front of House) under the direction of Tim Ronalds Architects, EC Harris, Bristow Johnson, Cambridge Architectural Research, Max Fordham, All Clear Designs, Ramboll UK, Carr and Angier and Wilton's staff.

The hall is used for performances and film and photo shoots. It is owned and managed by the Wilton's Music Hall Trust as an arts and heritage venue.

== Restoration ==
After years of under-investment, the venue was in a state of decay. It was featured on the BBC television series Restoration in 2003 as a nominee for the South East segment of the show, alongside Broomfield House in Enfield and Darnley Mausoleum in Kent. The building won the South East category, with the series' overall winner announced as Victoria Baths in Manchester.

Since the Wilton's Music Hall Trust took over ownership in 2004, restoration has made steady progress and the building is in much better shape.

Phase 1 of the Capital Project Works was finished in February 2013 with completion of repairs to the auditorium. Phase 2 repaired the five Georgian houses that make up the front half of Wilton's, having spent decades suffering from damp, rot, subsidence, dereliction, and leaking roofs. Phase 2 commenced in July 2014 and was completed in late 2015.

In February 2016 Wilton's Music Hall was shortlisted in the "Building Conservation" category of the RICS Awards 2016, London.

The building was for many years on Historic England's Heritage at Risk Register, but following its successful restoration, was removed from the list in 2016, and after 20 years on the register, it was named as one of the successful rescues.

== See also ==
- Hoxton Hall

== Sources ==
- Baker, Richard, Anthony (2005). British Music Hall: An Illustrated History. London: Sutton Publishing Ltd. ISBN 0-7-509-3685-1.
- John Earl and Michael Sell Guide to British Theatres 1750–1950, pp. 147–8 (Theatres Trust, 2000) ISBN 0-7136-5688-3
- Peter Honri John Wilton’s Music Hall, The Handsomest Room in Town (1985)
- Diana Howard London Theatres and Music Halls 1850–1950 (1970)
