= If Ever I Cease to Love =

1871 music hall song by George Leybourne

"If Ever I Cease to Love" is a music hall song published by the English Lion comique George Leybourne, who was popular in the Victorian music venues, in 1871. It has been performed by several musical artists and theatrical entertainers, including Lydia Thompson, who featured the song in her traveling operetta Bluebeard. Though Leybourne is best known for his composition "The Daring Young Man on the Flying Trapeze", the comedic lyrical content and catchy melody of "If Ever I Cease to Love" became tremendously appealing in New Orleans. Since the first Rex parade in 1872, the tune has been ceremoniously played to the krewe's figurehead, Rex, who bears the title "King of Carnival" in New Orleans.

== Background ==
Leybourne had begun his career in England's northern music halls in 1866. Dressed in formal wear, his performing style helped advance the popularity of entertainers known as Lion comiques who parodied upper-class swells. His 1867 compositions "Champagne Charlie" and "The Daring Young Man on the Flying Trapeze" furthered the concept of music hall in England and are considered Leybourne's greatest artistic successes. In 1871, he penned "If Ever I Cease to Love", with early editions of the sheet music crediting the tune simply as a "comedic song". The song featured a nonsensical chorus that forewarns the listener "If ever I cease to love, if ever I cease to love / May fish get legs and cows lay eggs / If ever I cease to love", which soon became open to other interpretations. Theatrical entertainer Lydia Thompson, while performing on the English music hall circuit, was amused by "If Ever I Cease to Love", and adapted it into her operetta, Bluebeard.

Thompson's act was spectated by Grand Duke Alexei Alexandrovich of Russia, fourth son of Tsar Alexander II, as she and her troupe, "The British Blondes", embarked on a US tour in 1872. The Grand Duke had been traveling across the east coast and Midwest of the US since the fall of 1871 in reciprocation for the 1867 visit to Russia made by Admiral David Farragut. Notorious for engaging in several scandalous affairs, Alexandrovich took a liking to Thompson after a private dinner party, and attended several more shows to see the performer. The burlesque troupe capitalized on the rumors of the two's supposed relationship, effectively boosting attendance for the latter half of their touring schedule.

All the while, the School of Design was formed to add an organized daytime parade on Mardi Gras Day to complement the established Mystick Krewe of Comus, which had held an annual nighttime parade and ball for over a decade since its founding in 1856. Well aware of the Thompson and Alexandrovich gossip, the School of Design invited the Grand Duke to their newly established parade, and fabricated a story that his arrival signaled a continuation of his romantic relationship with Thompson. In reality, Alexandrovich's had his eyes set on actress Lotta Crabtree who was involved in a traveling company performing the play "The Little Detective".

In 1872, the School of Design selected "If Ever I Cease to Love" as the royal anthem to be played for their appointed monarch, Rex, a position which is considered to be one of the highest honors in the City of New Orleans (a different individual is selected every year to reign as Rex and bear the title "King of Carnival" for that year's festivities). Already, the composition was in popular demand among the city's populace for its lighthearted premise, and interpretations by several writers, including columnists in the New Orleans Picayune. In contrast to initial reports, the song was not performed for the Grand Duke's arrival, but rather for the king, Rex, and has become the tradition ever since. The Russian national anthem was played, instead, for Alexandrovich.
