= George Edwards Hering =

English painter

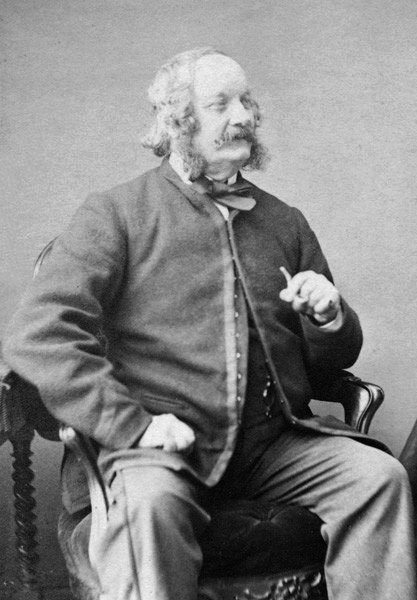
George Edwards Hering in the 1860s

George Edwards Hering (1805 – 18 December 1879) was an English landscape painter.

== Life ==
Born in London, he was a younger son of a German father who was a bookbinder. At an early age he lost his father. He was a clerk in a bank, but took up art as his profession.

In 1829 Hering studied in the art school at Munich, and Lord Erskine sent him with letters of introduction to Venice. After about two years there, he travelled in Italy, and round the Adriatic to Constantinople and Smyrna. On his return to Rome he met John Paget, and with Paget and a Mr. Sanford went on a tour through Hungary and Transylvania among the Carpathian mountains.

Hering settled in London, where he practised as a landscape-painter for the rest of his life, paying occasional visits to Italy. He died in London in 1879 and is buried at Highgate Cemetery (West). His wife was also an artist, and exhibited at the Royal Academy in 1853 and 1858.

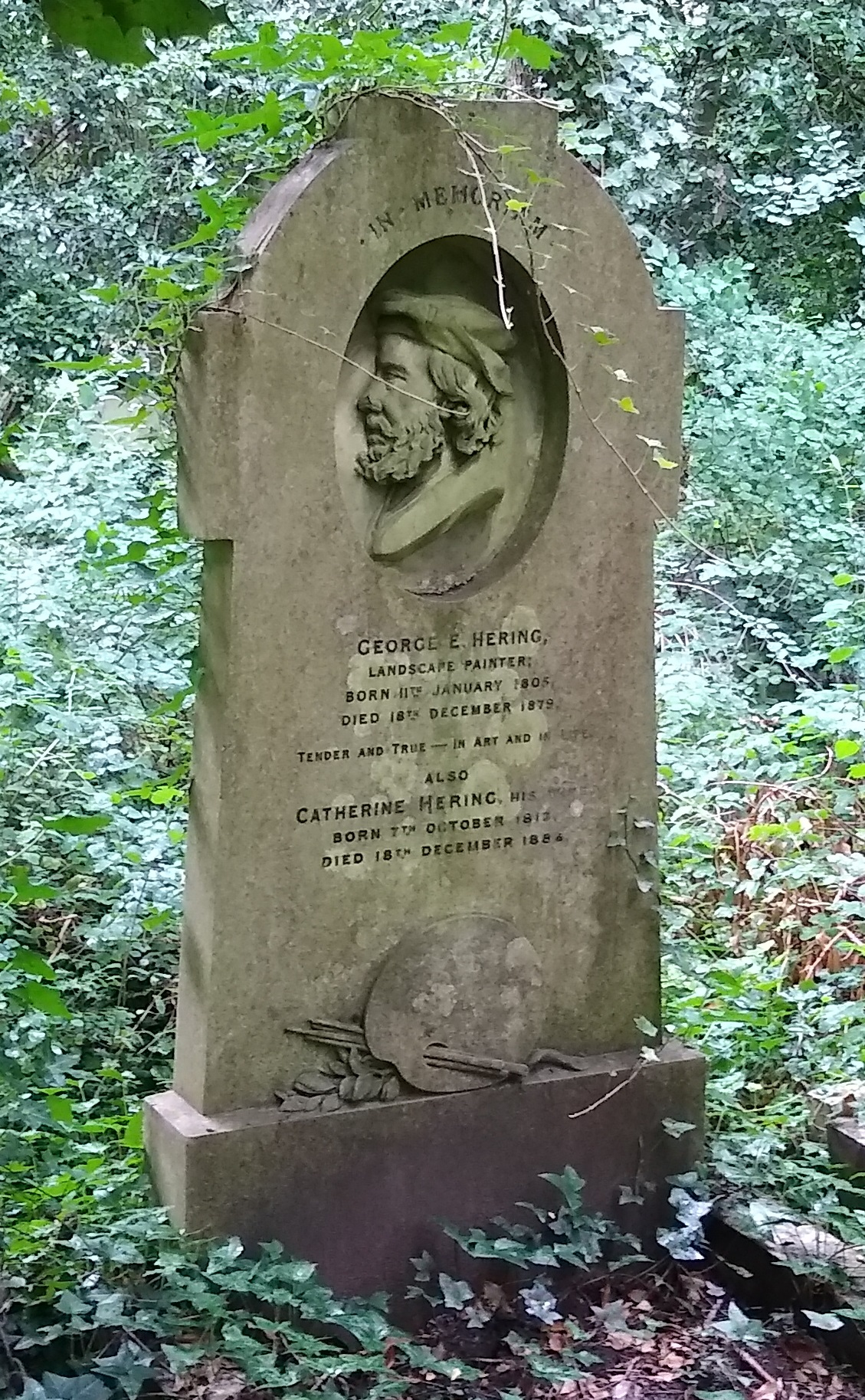
Headstone of George Edwards Hering in Highgate Cemetery (West)

== Works ==
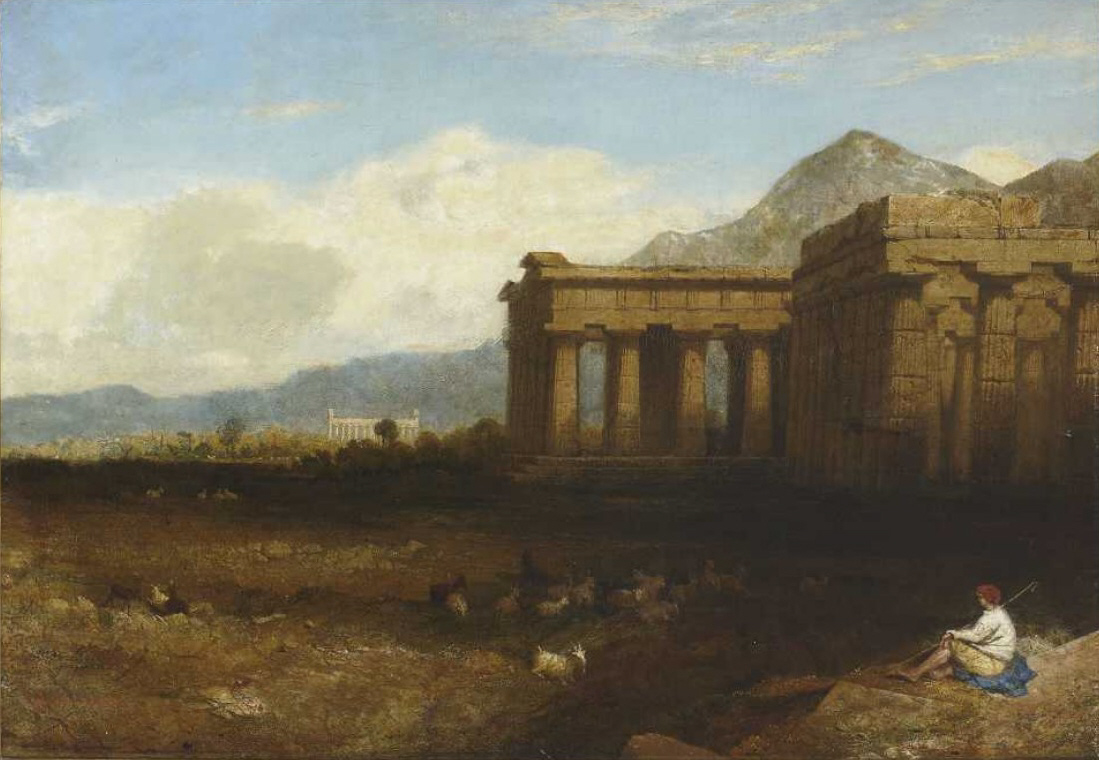
George Edwards Hering, the temple at Paestum

John Paget published an account of his Hungarian tour with illustrations by Hering, and Hering on his return to England published in 1838 a companion volume of Sketches on the Danube, in Hungary, and Transilvania, etc.

Hering specialised in Italian scenery, particularly with lakes. In 1836 he first exhibited at the Royal Academy, sending The Ruins of the Palace of the Cæsars, Rome, and was a regular contributor from that time to the Academy and to the British Institution. In 1841 he exhibited a painting of Amalfi, which, through Samuel Rogers, was purchased by Albert, Prince Consort; it was engraved by Edward Goodall for The Art Journal in 1856, and a similar painting of Capri, also purchased for the royal collection, was engraved for the same journal by Robert Brandard.

Hering painted some Scottish scenes by him are noteworthy. A picture of Tambourina was engraved for him by Charles George Lewis. In 1847 he published a set of twenty coloured lithographs, The Mountains and Lakes in Switzerland, the Tyrol, and Italy.
