= Conscription in the United Kingdom =

In the United Kingdom, military conscription has existed for two periods in modern times. The first was from 1916 to 1920, and the second from 1939 to 1960. The last conscription term ended in 1963 although many soldiers chose to continue in the service beyond 1963.

It was legally designated as "Military Service" from 1916 to 1920, and as "National Service" from 1939 to 1960. However, between 1939 and 1948, it was often referred to as "War Service" in documents relating to National Insurance and pension provision.

== First World War ==
Conscription during the First World War began when the British Parliament passed the Military Service Act in January 1916. The Act specified that single men aged 18 to 40 years old were liable to be called up for military service unless they were widowed with children, or were ministers of a religion. There was a system of tribunals to adjudicate upon claims for exemption on the grounds of performing civilian work of national importance, domestic hardship, health, and conscientious objection. The law went through several changes before the war ended. Married men were exempt in the original Act, although this was changed in May 1916. The age limit was also eventually raised to 51 years old. Recognition of work of national importance also diminished. In the last year of the war there was support for the conscription of clergy, though this was not enacted. Conscription lasted until 1920.

Due to the political situation in Ireland, conscription was never applied there, only in Great Britain (England, Scotland, and Wales). An attempt to do this caused a huge backlash from the Irish public, defeating it, with Irish nationalism gaining significant support because of the crisis, eventually resulting in a successful war for independence.

== Second World War ==
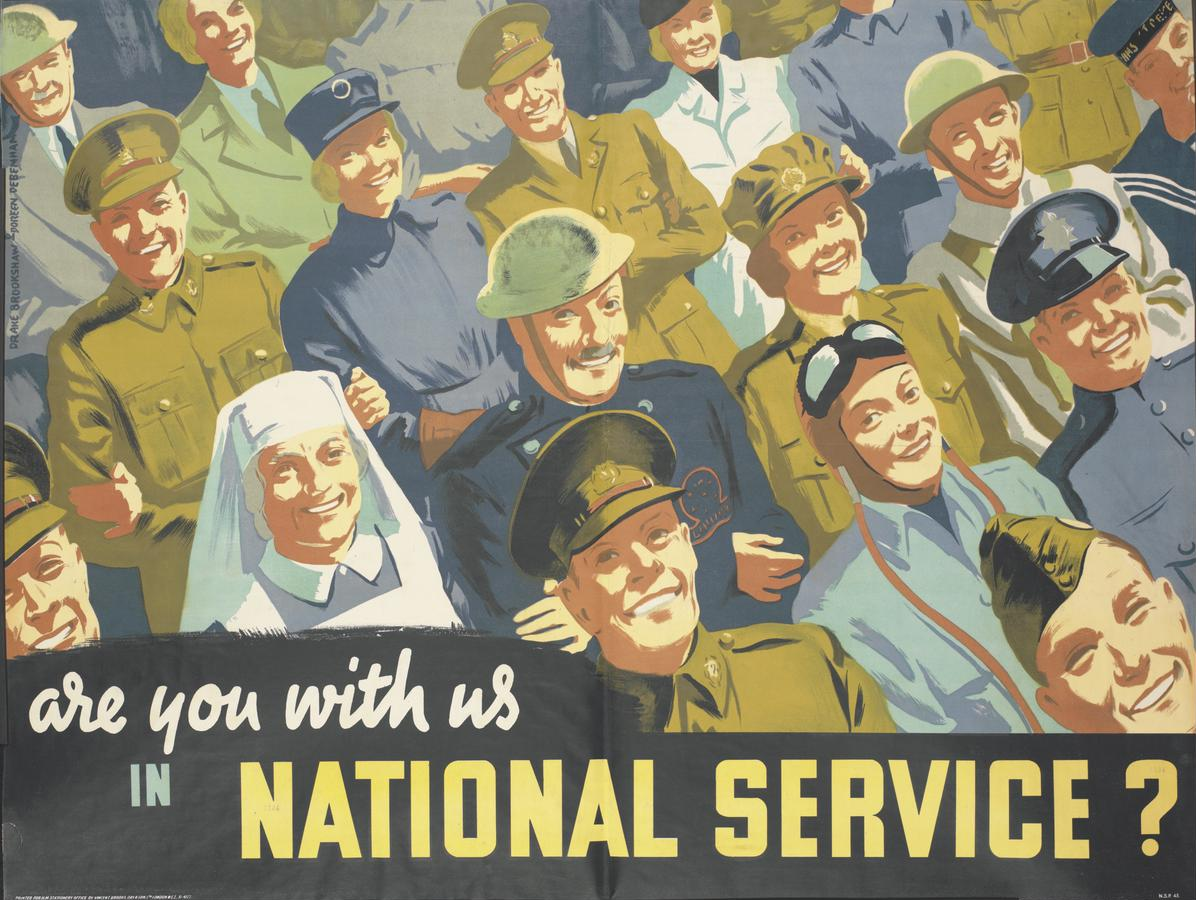
World War II poster from the United Kingdom

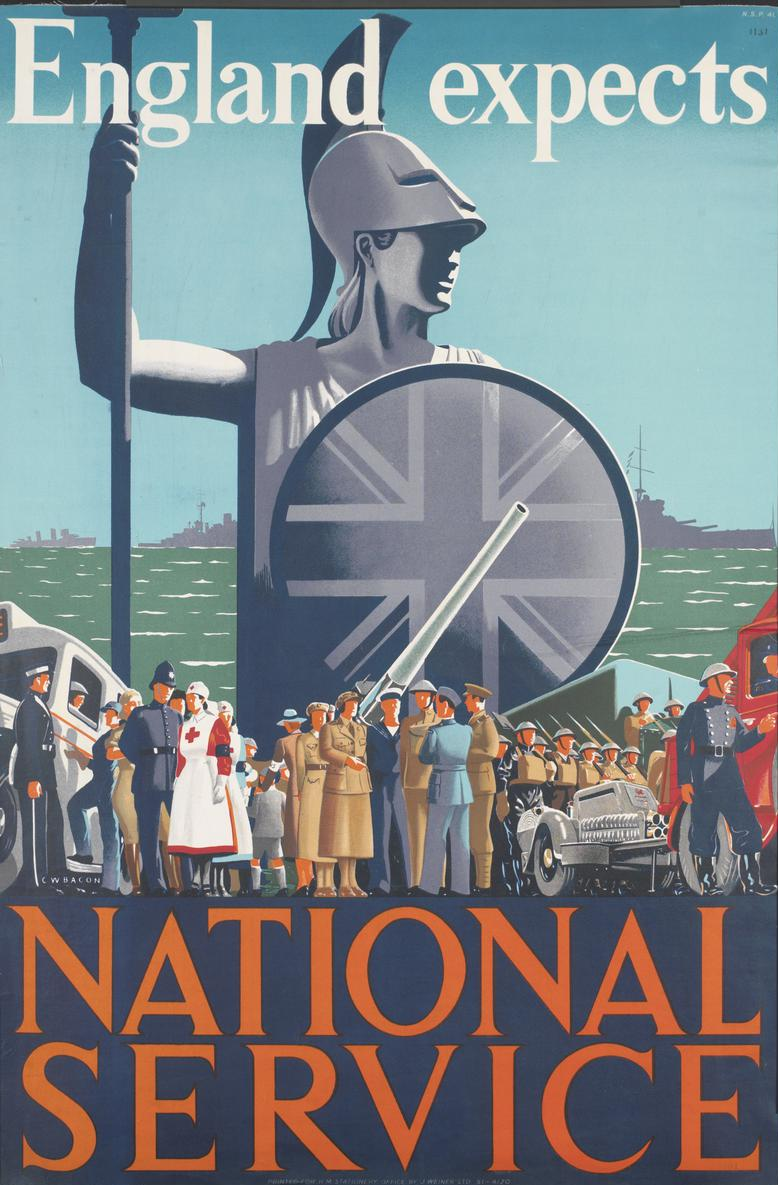
WW2-era poster with "England expects" legend

Conscription legislation lapsed in 1920. However, as a result of the deteriorating international situation and the rise of Nazi Germany, the Secretary of State for War, Leslie Hore-Belisha, persuaded the cabinet of Neville Chamberlain to introduce a limited form of conscription on 27 April 1939. The Military Training Act was passed the following month. Only single men 20 to 22 years old were liable to be called up, and they were to be known as "militiamen" to distinguish them from the regular army. To emphasise this distinction, each man was issued with a suit in addition to a uniform. The intention was for the first intake to undergo six months of basic training before being discharged into an active reserve. They would then be recalled for short training periods and attend an annual camp.

At the outbreak of war, on 3 September 1939, the Military Training Act was overtaken by the National Service (Armed Forces) Act 1939. The first intake was absorbed into the army. This act imposed a liability to conscription to all men aged 18 to 41 years who were living in Great Britain. Men could be rejected for medical reasons, and those engaged in vital industries or occupations were "reserved" at a particular age beyond which no one in that job would be enlisted. For example, lighthouse keepers and police officers were "reserved" at 18 years old. From 1943, some conscripts were directed into the British coal mining industry and become known as the "Bevin Boys". Provision was also made for conscientious objectors, who were required to justify their position to a tribunal, with power to allocate the applicant to one of three categories: unconditional exemption; exemption conditional upon performing specified civilian work (frequently farming, forestry or menial hospital work); exemption from only combatant service, meaning that the objector had to serve in the specially created Non-Combatant Corps or in some other non-combatant unit such as the Royal Army Medical Corps.

By 1942 all male British subjects between 18 and 51 years old and all females 20 to 30 years old resident in Great Britain and the Isle of Man were liable to be called up, with some exemptions:

- British subjects from outside Great Britain and the Isle of Man who had lived in the country for less than two years
- Police, medical and prison workers
- Students
- Persons employed by the government of any country of the British Empire except the United Kingdom
- Clergy of any denomination
- Those who were blind or had mental disorders
- Married women
- Women who had one or more children 14 years old or younger living with them. This included their own children, legitimate or illegitimate, stepchildren, and adopted children, as long as the child was adopted before 18 December 1941.

Pregnant women were not exempted, but in practice were not called up.

Men under 20 years old were initially not liable to be sent overseas, but this exemption was lifted by 1942. People called up before they were 51 years old but who reached their 51st birthday during their service were liable to serve until the end of the war. People who had retired, resigned or been dismissed from the forces before the war were liable to be called back if they had not reached 51 years of age.

Britain did not completely demobilise in 1945, as conscription continued after the war. Those already in the armed forces were given a release class determined by length of service and age. In practice, releases began in June 1945, and the last of the wartime conscripts had been released by 1949. However, urgently needed men, particularly those in the building trades, were released in 1945, although restrictions on their immediate employment were supposed to be enforced. All women were released at the end of the war.

== After 1945 ==
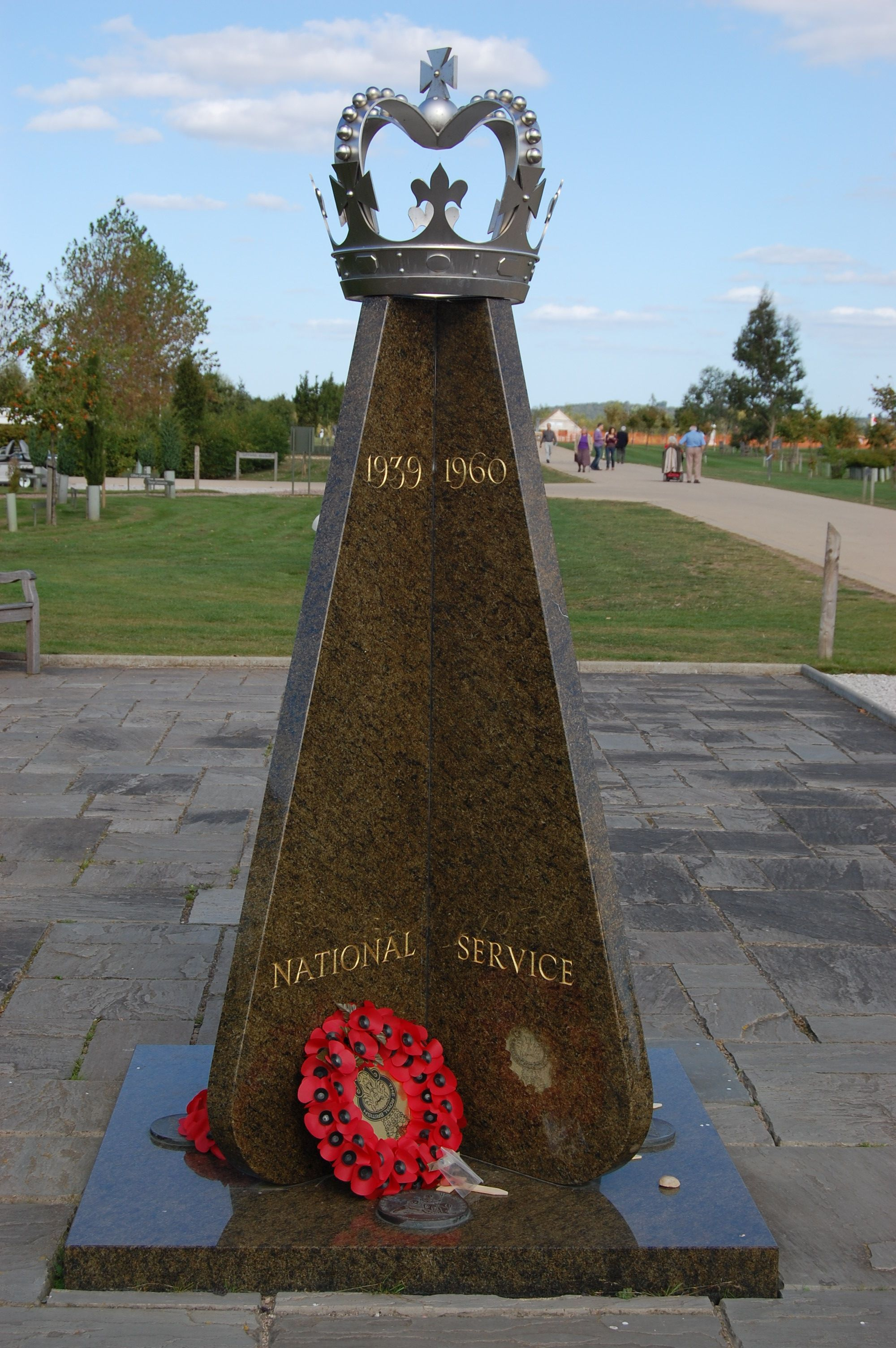
National Service (1939–1960) memorial at the National Memorial Arboretum in Staffordshire

National Service as peacetime conscription was formulated by the National Service Act 1948 introduced by Clement Attlee's Labour government. From 1 January 1949, healthy males 18 to 30 years old were required to serve in the armed forces for 18 months, and remain on the reserve list for four years. They could be recalled to their units for up to 20 days for no more than three occasions during these four years. Men were exempt from National Service if they worked in one of the three essential services: coal mining; farming; merchant navy for at least eight years. If they quit early, they were subject to being called up. Exemption continued for conscientious objectors, with the same tribunal system and categories.

In October 1950, in response to the British involvement in the Korean War, the service period was extended to two years; in compensation, the reserve period was reduced by six months. National Servicemen who showed promise could be commissioned as officers. National Service personnel were used in combat operations, including the Palestine Emergency, Malayan Emergency, the Cyprus Emergency, Kenya Emergency, and the Korean War, where conscripts to the Gloucestershire Regiment took part in the last stand during the Battle of the Imjin River. In addition, National Servicemen served in the Suez Crisis in 1956.

During the 1950s there was a prohibition on serving members of the armed forces standing for election to Parliament. A few National Servicemen stood for election in the 1951 and 1955 general elections in order to be dismissed from service.

National Service ended gradually from 1957. It was decided that men born on or after 1 October 1939 would not be required, but conscription continued for males born earlier whose call-up had been delayed for any reason. In November 1960, the last conscripted men entered service: call-ups ended on 31 December 1960; the last conscripted servicemen left the armed forces in May 1963.

Section 23(3) of the Civil Contingencies Act 2004 precludes the government from using that act to make emergency regulations that would "require a person, or enable a person to be required, to provide military service".

== British overseas territories ==
=== Bermuda ===
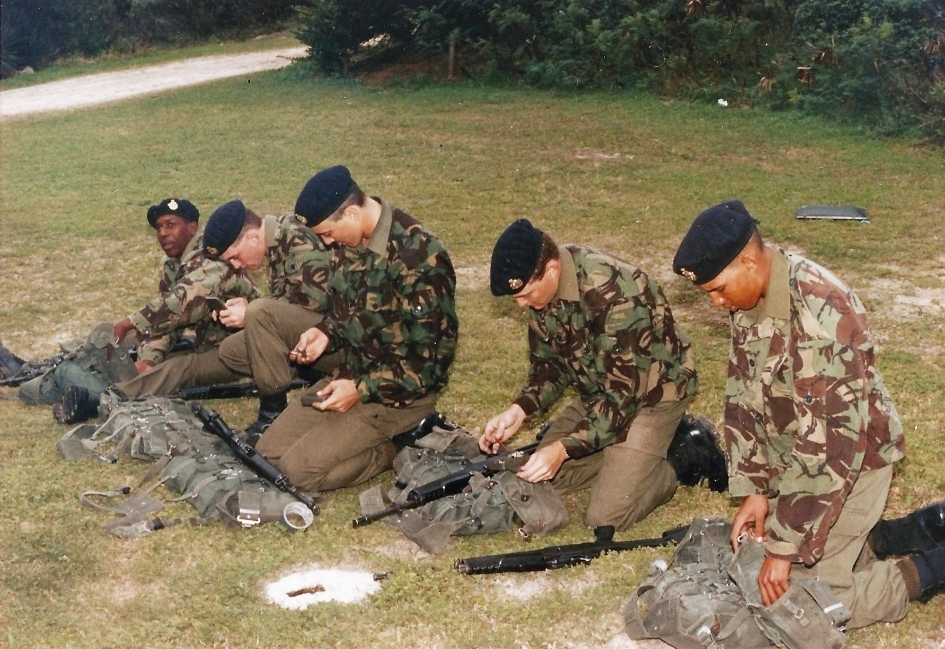
Bermuda Regiment recruits clean their Ruger Mini-14/20GB rifles prior to a shoot at Warwick Camp in Bermuda during the 1993 Recruit Camp.

The British overseas territory of Bermuda was the last British jurisdiction to abolish conscription.

Service in the old Bermuda Militia from 1612 to 1816, as in the Militia of the Kingdom of England (including the Principality of Wales) and subsequently the English and Welsh Militia of the Kingdom of Great Britain, had been compulsory, with all able-bodied, military-aged males, whether free, indentured, or enslaved, liable. The Militia was divided into nine companies, one for each parish (collectively forming a battalion under a lieutenant-colonel, and later two battalions), and were embodied annually for training, or as required by war or emergency. Volunteers, organised under appointed Captains of Forts, also manned fortified coastal artillery batteries to maintain a standing defence against enemy vessels or landing parties. This Militia was raised under acts of the colonial Parliament of Bermuda, which required periodic renewal. Bermuda had received its first regular (English Army) unit (an Independent Company, detached from the 2nd Regiment of Foot) in 1701. This was withdrawn in 1763, following the Seven Years' War, and replaced by a company detached from the 9th Regiment of Foot in Florida and a detachment from the Independent Company of the Bahamas, but these were withdrawn in 1768, leaving only the militia and volunteer gunners. Two companies of the invalid Royal Garrison Battalion were posted to Bermuda during the American War of Independence, but this unit was disbanded at Bermuda in 1783.

Regular British Army infantry (a detachment of the 47th Regiment of Foot) was detached to Bermuda to re-establish the Bermuda Garrison in 1793 as the French Revolution led to war between Britain and France. This unit was joined in 1794 by a company Invalid Royal Artillery from the Board of Ordnance Military Corps (and not at that time part of the British Army). Royal Engineers officers had already been posted to Bermuda to survey the defences and oversee their improvement. There were no Royal Sappers and Miners present, however, until the 19th century, and civilians (including retired soldiers) were hired locally to carry out the construction work. At the same time, the Royal Navy established in Bermuda what was to become the Royal Naval Dockyard, Bermuda and an Admiralty House, and the primary role of the growing military garrison became the protection of the main base of the Royal Navy's North America and West Indies Station as the British Government came to view Fortress Bermuda more as a base than a colony. The build-up of the regular military forces led to the Parliament of Bermuda allowing the Militia Act to lapse after 1816 as the reserve forces were perceived as an unnecessary expense (the Militia in the United Kingdom was also allowed to become a paper tiger after the conclusion of the Napoleonic Wars and the American War of 1812, and was not restored until the 1850s, from which time it recruited only volunteers (although the ballot was retained in case it became necessary to keep the militia up to strength, it was not utilised agan); the Volunteer Force was raised at the same time to boost Britain's defences). The British Government spent the next eight decades unsuccessfully asking, pleading and cajoling the local government to restore the militia until the requirement of consent from the Secretary of State for War for American investment into the Princess Hotel and the dredging of the channel into the St. George's Harbour led the local parliament to pass new militia and volunteer acts in 1892. During the interim, Bermudian volunteers had been recruited for local-service only into the regular army and the Board of Ordnance Military Corps, under terms of service similar to those of the old militia.

From 1894, recruitment into the new part-time military reserves raised under the 1892 acts had originally followed the post-1850s practices in England for the Militia of the United Kingdom, in which soldiers voluntarily enlisted for six years (embodied for the duration of wars or emergencies, or otherwise only for annual training), and the Volunteer Force, in which part-time soldiers served voluntarily and could quit their service with 14 days' notice, except while embodied for training, war, or national emergency. The Militia became the Special Reserve (which was allowed to lapse after the First World War) and the Volunteer Force and Yeomanry were merged into the Territorial Force (later renamed the Territorial Army and in 2014 the Army Reserve) in Britain in 1907–1908, with the introduction of terms of service for the Territorial Force (specific lengths of service for which volunteers engaged, so that they could no longer quit until completing their engagements), but this did not occur in Bermuda until the 1920s (1921 for the BVRC and 1928 for the BMA, as post-war reductions of the British Government's defence budget led to the reduction of the regular army components of the Bermuda Garrison, with the reserve units taking on greater responsibilities). Conscription into the Bermuda Militia Artillery and the Bermuda Volunteer Rifle Corps was discussed during the First World War, but had not been put into place before the cessation of hostilities. It was introduced during the Second World War, with conscripts serving full-time for the duration in the BMA, BVRC, the Bermuda Volunteer Engineers (raised in 1931), or the Bermuda Militia Infantry (raised in 1939). Those unable to serve full-time were directed into the Bermuda Home Guard (raised for the duration of the war). Although conscription ended with the war, a shortfall of volunteers led to its reintroduction to the BVRC in 1957 (when the regular army components of the Bermuda Garrison were withdrawn, leaving only the two territorials in Bermuda) and the BMA in 1960. Since the two units were amalgamated in 1965, conscription was retained until July 2018, making the Royal Bermuda Regiment the last conscripted force serving under the British Crown. As per the "Bermuda Report" for 1965 and 1966:

All local male British Subjects between 18 and 25 years of age are required to register for military training. The Act provides machinery for conscription to supplement the voluntary enlistments and so maintain the strength of the unit.

== Support for reintroduction of conscription ==
In 2015, Prince Harry made a call for bringing back conscription. Following the launch of his 2009 film Harry Brown, English actor Michael Caine called for the reintroduction of national service in the UK to give young people "a sense of belonging rather than a sense of violence."

In 2024, Chief of the General Staff General Patrick Saunders delivered a speech advocating a volunteer "citizen army" of the willing in the wake of global turmoil, specifically the Russo-Ukrainian War and the 2022 Russian invasion of Ukraine, which elements of the press characterised as advocacy of conscription; these statements generated controversy, and led to the Ministry of Defence and a spokesman for the British Prime Minister Rishi Sunak publicly denying this was a plan by the armed forces, with the former issuing a statement declaring "The British military has a proud tradition of being a voluntary force and there is absolutely no suggestion of a return to conscription".

Reintroduction of mandatory national service was part of the Conservative Party manifesto for the 2024 general election, despite Conservative defence minister Andrew Murrison stating that the government favoured a volunteer professional military and national service would have a negative effect on morale. Under these plans, which would have cost £2.5 billion, all 18-year-olds would have been required to perform a one-year full-time paid placement in the armed forces, or to perform part-time unpaid community service of 25 days over one year.

== See also ==
- Civil conscription
- Class Z Reserve
- Court-martial
- Jeannette and Jeannot
- Massacre of Tranent
- Military recruit training
- Peace Pledge Union
- War Resisters' International
