= Joseph Bentley =

Joseph Bentley may refer to:

- Joseph T. Bentley (1906–1993), general superintendent of the Young Men's Mutual Improvement Association of the LDS Church
- Joseph Clayton Bentley (1809–1851), English line-engraver and painter
