= Jeannette and Jeannot =

"Jeannette and Jeannot" (English: /ʒɑːˈnɛt ænd ʒɑːˈnoʊ/ ZHAH-NET-and-ZHAH-NOH) is a popular piece of music written in 1847 by British theatre orchestra violinist and composer, Charles William Glover (1806–1863). It inspired other works on the theme of military conscription, and the tune was still being played by musicians around the world more than a century and a half later.

The original lyrics depict two young French lovers about to separate because of war. Jeannette expresses concern that Jeannot may forget her:

You are going far away, far away from poor Jeannette,
There is no one left to love me now, and you, too, may forget.
But my heart will be with you, wherever you may go,
Can you look me in the face and say the same, Jeannot?

Glover incorporated the title song into "The Jeannette and Jeannot Quadrille", a dance music routine. The sheet music was illustrated by the well-known lithographic artist John Brandard (1812–1863). Combined with Glover's music and lyrics, Brandard's lithographs were then used to help put "Jeannette and Jeannot" into British theatres.

The prolific playwright Edward Stirling (1807–1894) produced Jeannette and Jeannot, also known as The village pride. Promoted as a "musical drama in two acts", it was first performed at London's Olympic Theatre in October 1848. "If it had been produced earlier in the season, before the public had been almost cloyed with Glover's very pretty ballads, we should have anticipated a long run", wrote The Theatrical Times. "The plot, of course, is told in the title, and Miss Rebecca Isaacs, as Jeannette, looked very much like Brandard's clever lithographs on the music."

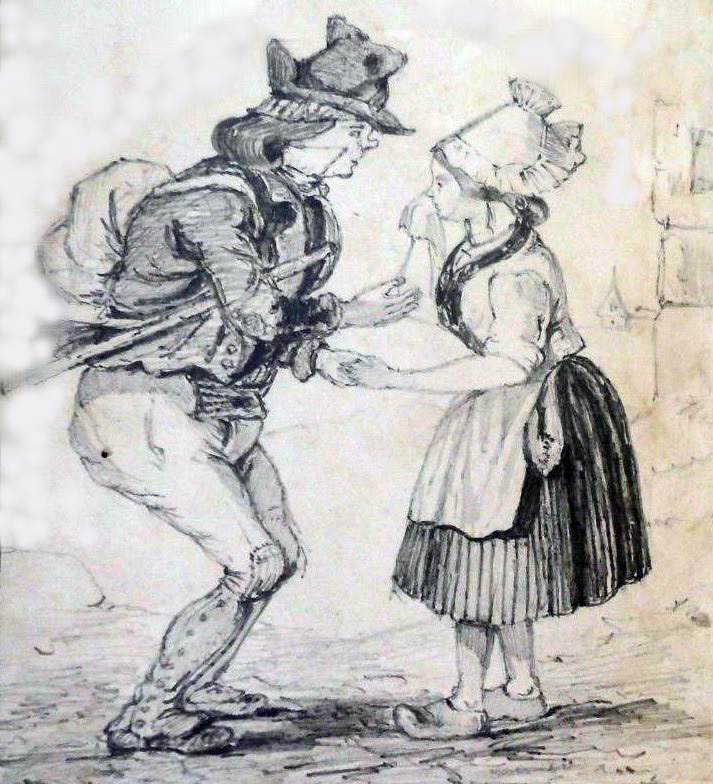
A drawing by John Brandard depicting Jeannette and Jeannot farewelling each other.

In Stirling's play, Jeannot was leaving to fight in the French revolutionary wars as an army conscript. A new French system of conscription introduced in 1798, making men aged 20 to 25 liable for five years of army service, is seen as the beginning of modern European conscription.

In 1852, the London actor and singer William Hawthorne Eburne produced a second musical called Jeannette and Jeannot or The Conscript's Vow. By the 1860s, the names "Jeannette" and "Jeannot" were being used by some publications to symbolically represent all young French lovers separated by the country's conscription system.

The original lyrics of Glover's "Jeannette and Jeannot" have often been parodied. This is an extract from one example (sung to the same tune) from 1849:

You are going far away, far away from all your debts,
There's one left to pay me now, and you have no assets;
But my Bill it will be with you wherever you may go,
Can you look into my Ledger, and deny me what you owe.

The tune of "Jeannette and Jeannot" is still played in the 21st Century by guitarists, violinists, pianists and other musicians.

Glover's numerous other productions included sentimental ballads like the well-known "Rose of Tralee", and semi-comedic compositions.
