= Arthur Lloyd (musician) =

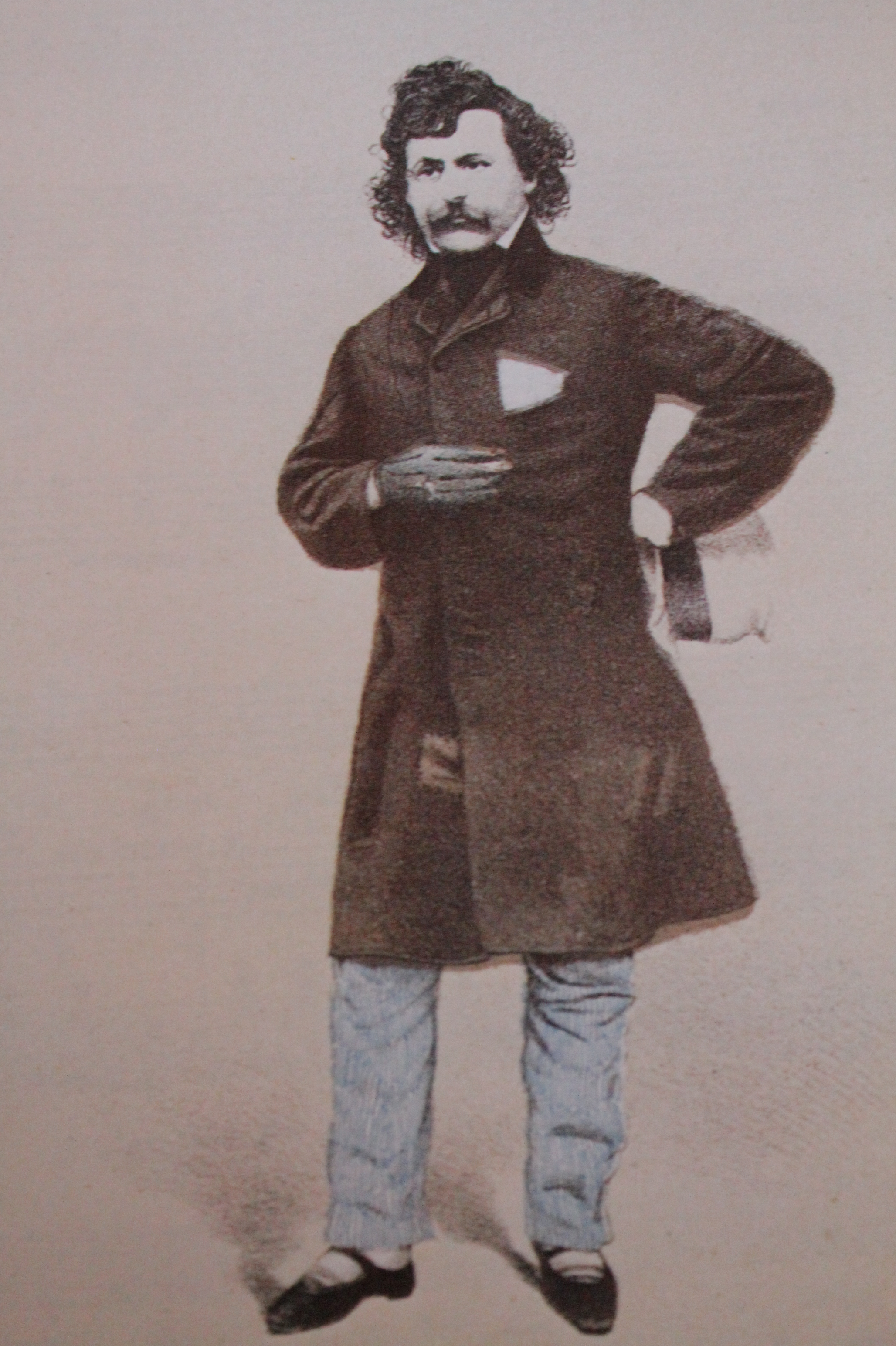
- Born: Arthur Rice Lloyd; 14 May 1839; Edinburgh, Scotland
- Died: 20 July 1904 (aged 65); Edinburgh, Scotland
- Known for: Singer, songwriter, comedian, impresario

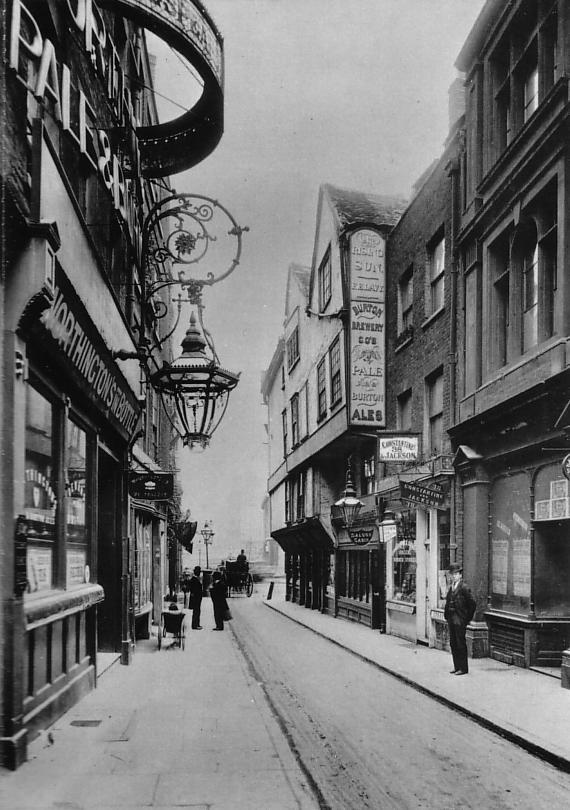
At Arthur Lloyd's Theatre, Wych Street, London, 1901

Arthur Rice Lloyd (14 May 1839 – 20 July 1904) was a Scottish singer, songwriter, comedian and impresario. Lloyd was the first prolific and successful singer-songwriter for music hall in the United Kingdom.

He wrote more than 1,000 songs, many of which were performed by himself and others. One of his compositions, "Not for Joseph", was the first comic song to sell more than 100,000 copies. He established his own theatre company, opened a theatre in London, performed for royalty and toured extensively, touring North America in 1893–94.

== Early life ==
Arthur Rice Lloyd was born into a musical family in Edinburgh. His father was Horatio Lloyd, a comic actor based at the Theatre Royal, and his mother, Eliza Horncastle, was a member of the Pyne and Harrison Opera Company. The family lived at 7 Annandale Street, a large Georgian flat at the top of Leith Walk.

From an early age, the young Arthur expressed a desire for a career on the stage, however his father was initially resistant. In 1856 Arthur's father agreed to send his son to the Theatre Royal, Plymouth, where Arthur's uncle, (his father's brother, Fred) was a leading actor. He spent two seasons at the Theatre Royal after which he performed with his father in Scotland. While on a break from the theatre, Arthur tried his hand at the music hall, giving his first appearance at the Minerva Hall in Glasgow. He secured an engagement at Glasgow's Whitebait Music Hall in March 1861 and following a successful season, he headed to London where he gave his debut at the Sun Music Hall in Knightsbridge on 12 October 1862. In the same year, he also performed at the Marylebone Theatre and Philharmonic Music Halls.

== Career ==
Lloyd achieved success early in his career. In 1863, the "Song of Songs" became a popular hit with copies of the sheet music being sold in the thousands. He had enormous popular success with "Not for Joseph" (1868), a tune that was inspired by a chance meeting with a London bus conductor, who spoke about himself in the third person. This became the first comic tune to sell more than 100,000 copies In the 1860s, Lloyd and contemporaries Alfred Peck Stevens and George Leybourne were instrumental in developing a new style of music hall performer, known as the lion comique or "swell". In this style, performers relied less on copying burlesque, and instead sought inspiration in their everyday experiences and the colourful characters of daily street life. Audiences loved to join in the chorus and "give the bird."

Lloyd achieved great success with his character-songs in the 1870s. He wrote songs for his own performances, as well as for other artists. He specialised in Cockney songs, with many titles devoted to the subject of costermongers. Unlike other music hall composers, his songs were not entirely dependent on the performer's ability to mimic Cockney accents and mannerisms, but rather the lyrics used a "quaintness of fancy" and humour.

A prolific composer, Lloyd wrote over one thousand songs, most of them now forgotten, except for "Married to a Mermaid" (1866) which is occasionally sung in the UK. He performed for the Prince of Wales and other royalty on a few occasions (command performances). Lloyd was the first prolific and successful singer-songwriter for music hall.

As a performer, he toured extensively, working with leading actors, comedians and musicians of the period. He toured the United States and Canada during 1893–94 to produce his musical comedy, Our Party. Lloyd was also an impresario who operated his own theatrical company, known simply as Arthur Lloyd's Musical Company.

== Personal life ==
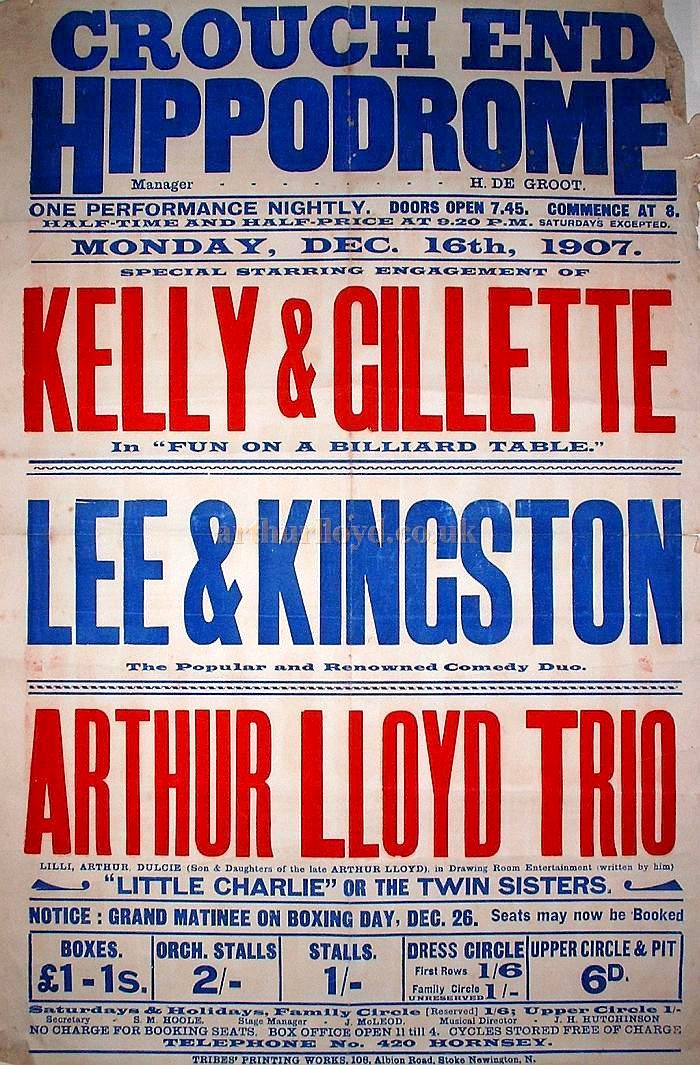
Poster advertising three of Lloyd's children performing at the Crouch End Hippodrome in 1907

He married Catherine Olivia King, the daughter of Thomas Charles King, in London on 31 July 1871, who was known professionally as "Katty King" and was a light comic actress. The couple had six children; Annie (b.'1871); Henry Robert (b. 1874); Dulcie (b. 1875); Katherine (b.1876); Lilian (b. 1877) and Arthur (b. 1879). Of his children, his son, Harry and his daughter, Kitty, both took up stage careers. Arthur Lloyd died in July 1904 in his home at 18 Fettes Row in Edinburgh and was buried in Newington Cemetery on 23 July. The grave is lost.

== Songs composed and performed by Lloyd ==
Popular tunes, composed by Lloyd, include:

- "Chillingowullabadorie" (n.d.)
- "Song of Songs" (c. 1862)
- "Three Acres and a Cow" (1865)
- "My Story is True" (1865)
- "Cruel Mary Holder" (1866)
- "Married to a Mermaid" (1866)
- "Not for Joseph" (1868)
- "The Railway Porter" (c. 1868)
- "Constantinople" (1870)
- "Brown, the Tragedian" (1870)
- "It's Naughty, but it's Nice" (1870)
- "I Fancy I can See Her Now" (1870)
- "Just the Thing for Frank" (1870)
- "The Costermonger's Song" alternative title "Going to the Derby in My Little Donkey Cart" (1880)
- "The Costermonger's Christening"
- "The Costermonger's Wedding"
- "The Blighted Barber" (c. 1873)
- "The Bloated Aristocrat" (1873)
- "The Millingtary Band" (1873)
- "The Tichborne Case" (1873)
- Immensikoff or The Shoreditch Toff (1873)
- "The Brewer's Daughter" (1875)
- "Take it, Bob" (1880)
- "Drink, and Let's Have Another" (1891)
- "Pretty Lips" (n.d.)
- "At it Again" (n.d.)
- "Newhaven Fishwife" (n.d.)
- "I Like to Be a Swell" (n.d.)

== In popular culture ==
The expression "Not for Joseph" or "Not for Joe," from Lloyd's music hall song of the same name, was in popular use as an expression until well after the First World War. Lines from Lloyd's song Pretty Lips were quoted in Rudyard Kipling's book Stalky & Co.

The Dictionary of Slang and Unconventional English credits Lloyd with popularising the term toff to refer to a well-to-do person. The term most likely originated from an abbreviation of Cockney slang, where a toffee-nosed person was simplified to a toff. However, the popularity of Lloyd's song "The Shoreditch Toff" did a great deal to ensure that the expression entered the popular lexicon.

Three of his songs are referenced in James Joyce's Ulysses.
