= From Branch to Branch =

Studio album by Leon Redbone
- Released: 1981
- Studio: Atlantic (New York City); The Burbank Studios (Burbank, California); The Hit Factory (New York City); Mediasound (New York City)
- Genre: Ragtime
- Length: 34:39
- Label: Atlantic
- Producer: Beryl Handler, Joel Dorn, Leon Redbone

Leon Redbone chronology
Champagne Charlie (1978)	From Branch to Branch (1981)	Leon Redbone Live (1985)

From Branch to Branch is a studio album by Leon Redbone, released in 1981. It was his first on Atlantic Records and peaked at No. 152 on the Billboard 200 chart.

Professional ratings
Review scores
Source	Rating
AllMusic	2.5/5 stars

== Track listing ==
Side one

1. "(Mama's Got a Baby Named) Te Na Na" (Leon Redbone) – 2:58
2. "A Hot Time in the Old Town Tonight" (Theodore August Metz, Joe Hayden, Redbone) – 3:00
3. "Sweet Mama (Papa's Getting Mad)" (Peter Frost, George Little, Fred Rose) – 2:42
4. "Step It Up and Go" (Rudy Ray Moore, Redbone) – 3:40
5. "Your Cheatin' Heart" (Hank Williams) – 3:02
6. "Seduced" (Gary Tigerman) – 2:40

Side two

1. "Why" (Jelly Roll Morton, Ed Werac) – 4:42
2. "My Blue Heaven" (Walter Donaldson, George A. Whiting) – 2:21
3. "Extra Blues" (Redbone) – 4:03
4. "When You Wish Upon a Star" (Leigh Harline, Ned Washington) – 2:01
5. "Prairie Lullaby" (Mary Rogers) – 3:30

== Personnel ==
Musicians

- Leon Redbone – vocals, guitar
- Dr. John – piano, drums, hambone
- Mitch Holder – guitar
- Ralph Humphrey – drums
- Tim May – banjo
- Grady Tate – drums
- Terry Waldo – drums
- Michael Braun – drums
- Bob Cranshaw – bass guitar, vibraphone
- Jonathan Dorn – tuba
- Tom Artin – trombone
- Vince Giordano – bass saxophone
- Bobby Gordon – clarinet, saxophone
- Jack Maheu – clarinet
- Victor Morosco – clarinet
- Robert Payne – trombone
- Ed Polcer – trumpet
- Jim Rothermel – clarinet, saxophone
- Jim Self – tuba
- Dick Halligan – arranger
- William S. Fischer – string arrangements

Technical

- Beryl Handler – producer
- Joel Dorn – producer
- Ed Sprigg – engineer
- Vince McGarry – engineer
- Michael O'Reilly – assistant engineer
- Tom Heid – assistant engineer
- Sandi Young – art direction
