= Jenny Hill (music hall performer) =

English music hall performer

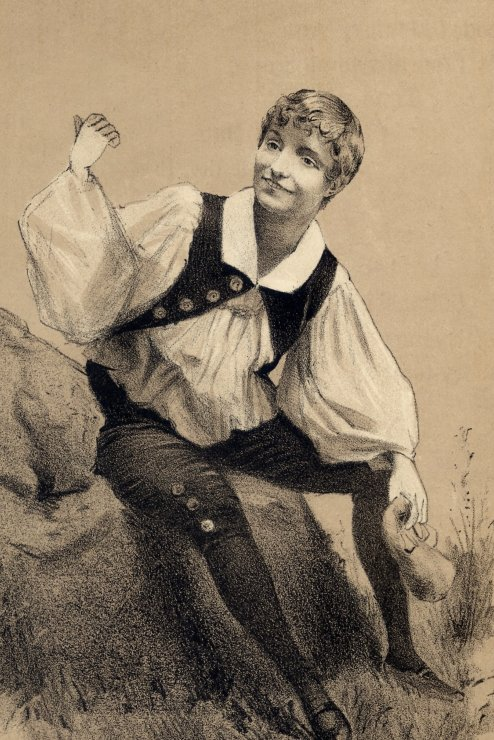
Jenny Hill c.1885

Jenny Hill (c. 1848 – 28 June 1896), born Elizabeth Jane Thompson, was an English music hall performer of the Victorian era known as "The Vital Spark" and "the Queen of the Halls". Her repertoire of songs included "'Arry", "The Boy I Love is Up in the Gallery", "The Little Vagabond Boy", "I've Been a Good Woman to You" and "If I Only Bossed the Show".

Hill made her stage début at an early age in a pantomime version of Mother Goose at the Aquarium Theatre in Westminster. After a difficult apprenticeship at a public house, she embarked on a career in music hall by 1868. She made a success at the London Pavilion, and until 1890 she was at the peak of her fame, enjoying top-billing at music halls across London and in the northern provinces. In 1879 she became the proprietor of her first music hall and later owned or operated several more, but without success.

By 1889 her health was declining, and she was forced to cancel a number of theatrical engagements. After a tour of New York in 1891, she returned to London where she made some appearances until 1894, but was mostly in poor health.

== Early life ==
A contemporary of Marie Lloyd and Bessie Bellwood, Jenny Hill was born in Paddington, London, to Michael Thompson (1812/13–1881) a Marylebone cab driver. Her stage début was made at the age of six or seven, when she performed as the legs of the goose in the pantomime Mother Goose at the Aquarium Theatre in Westminster. In about 1860 she made her professional debut at Dr Johnson's Concert Rooms, traditional "Song & Supper Rooms" in Fleet Street. In 1862 her father apprenticed her to a publican in Bradford. In return for the chance to sing to the public house's customers until 2 a.m. she suffered great privations, which would seriously affect her health in later life, rising at 5 a.m. to polish the pub's bar and pewter, washing glasses, scrubbing floors and bottling beer until her performance began at noon.

On 28 May 1866, aged 18, she married John Wilson Woodley, an acrobat known by the stage name Jean Pasta; he later abandoned her, leaving her with three children, one of whom became the music hall performer Peggy Pryde.

== Music hall career ==
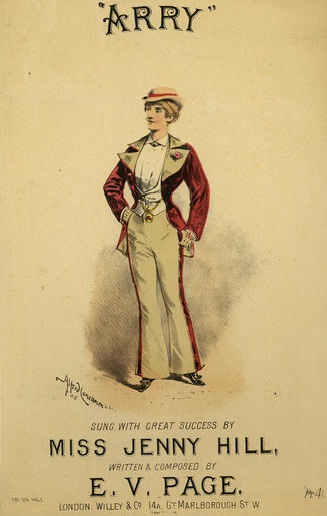
Alfred Concanen's sheet music cover for 'Arry by E. V. Page (1882)

In London, Hill was engaged for a tryout at the London Pavilion, a music hall, where her song stopped the show. The popular entertainer George Leybourne led her back onto the stage for an encore. By 1871 she was earning £6 a week at the London Pavilion. The theatrical agent Hugh J. Didcott gave the expressive, witty and vivacious Hill the sobriquet "The Vital Spark", which she used throughout her career.

Hill remained at the peak of her career until 1890, enjoying top-billing at music halls in London and the northern provinces. One source claimed that she appeared at three or four different halls a night, earning £30 at each hall. Her repertoire was varied and ranged from the tuneful "Maggie Murphy's Home" to the melodramatic "Masks and Faces". As a music hall manager she was less successful. In 1879 she purchased the Star Music Hall in Bermondsey (where Bessie Bellwood had made her debut), and from July 1882 to 1883 she kept a public house in Southwark. She purchased the Rainbow Music Hall (later renamed the Gaiety Theatre) in Southampton in July 1884. Opening in September 1884 after refurbishment, it burned down in December of the same year. In the straight theatre she played, among other roles, Nan in the 1889 revival of J. B. Buckstone's Good for Nothing in Shoreditch.

== Later years ==
On 25 March 1889 she appeared on the same bill as Bessie Bellwood at the Canterbury Theatre of Varieties. Her repertoire of songs included "'Arry", "The Boy I Love is Up in the Gallery", "The Little Vagabond Boy", "I've Been a Good Woman to You" and "If I Only Bossed the Show". Eventually, she earned enough by dancing the "Cellar Flap", singing her song "The Coffee-Shop Girl" and by her male impersonations to buy The Hermitage and its farmlands at Streatham.

By 1889 the privations she had suffered in her early life were taking their toll, and she was forced to cancel a number of theatrical engagements due to ill health. Following the death of her estranged husband John Wilson Woodley on 8 January 1890 she married Edward Turnbull, a music hall manager; in December 1890 she was given a benefit at Canterbury Hall.

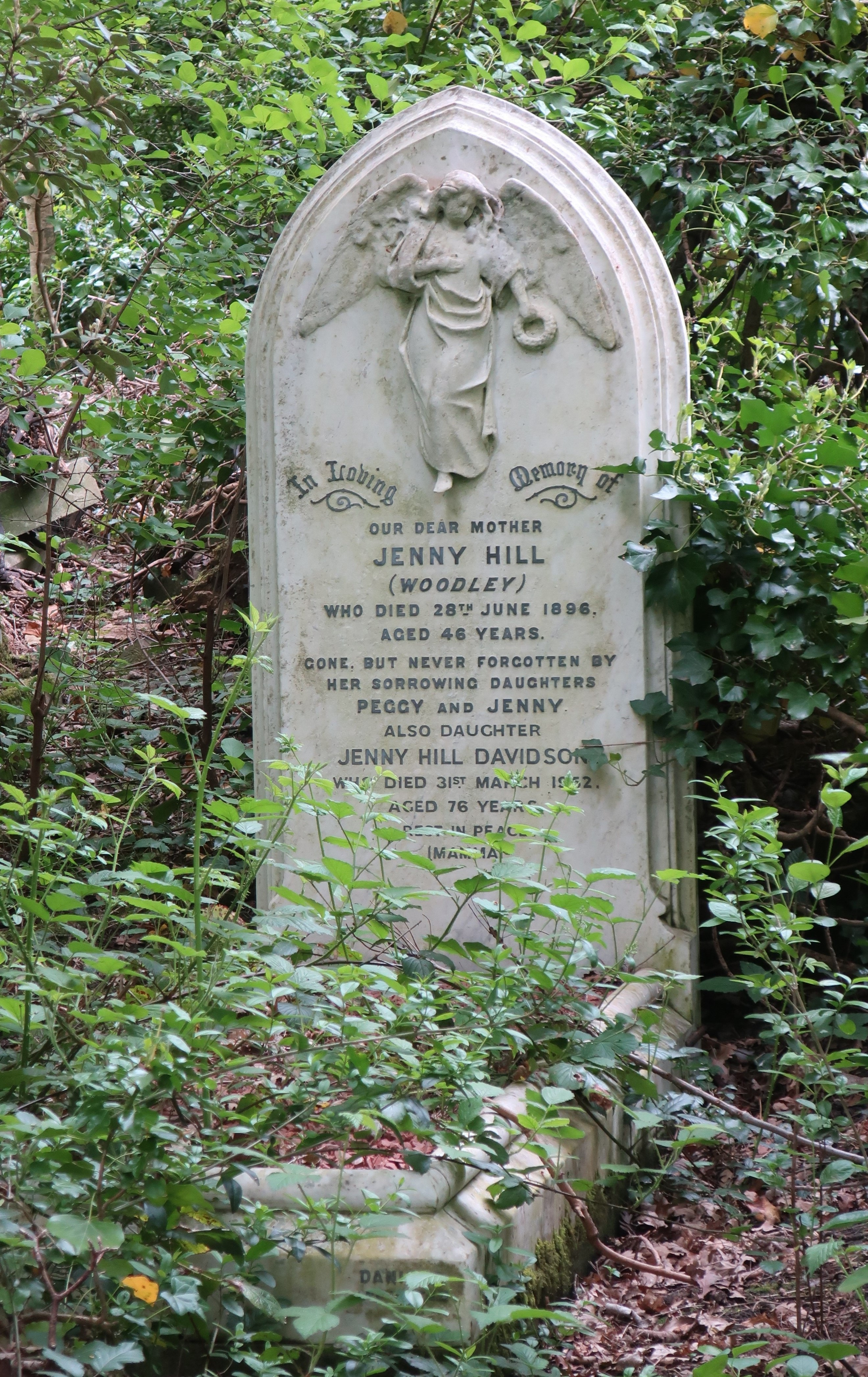
Grave of Jenny Hill in Nunhead Cemetery

Hill played on the vaudeville stage in New York for sixteen weeks from February 1891, but American audiences had difficulty understanding her London slang. Following her return to Britain she was given another benefit in September 1892 at Canterbury Hall after a period of ill health, but by June 1893 she had recovered sufficiently to appear at the London Pavilion and the Oxford Music Hall. She then went on a British tour that included Birmingham, Manchester, Liverpool and Bradford, her former home. Because of her continuing ill health she was advised by her doctors to go to a warmer climate for the winter. She accepted the invitation of the theatre manager Luscombe Searelle to appear in Johannesburg, arriving there in December 1893. By then her health was so poor that she could only be taken onto the stage in her wheelchair where she shook hands with her audience. Returning to Britain in May 1894 she moved to the more moderate climate of Bournemouth for her health.

Hill died in 1896 of pulmonary tuberculosis at her daughter Peggy's home in London, aged 48. She is buried in Nunhead Cemetery in London.
