= Alfred Concanen =

Irish lithographer (died 1886)

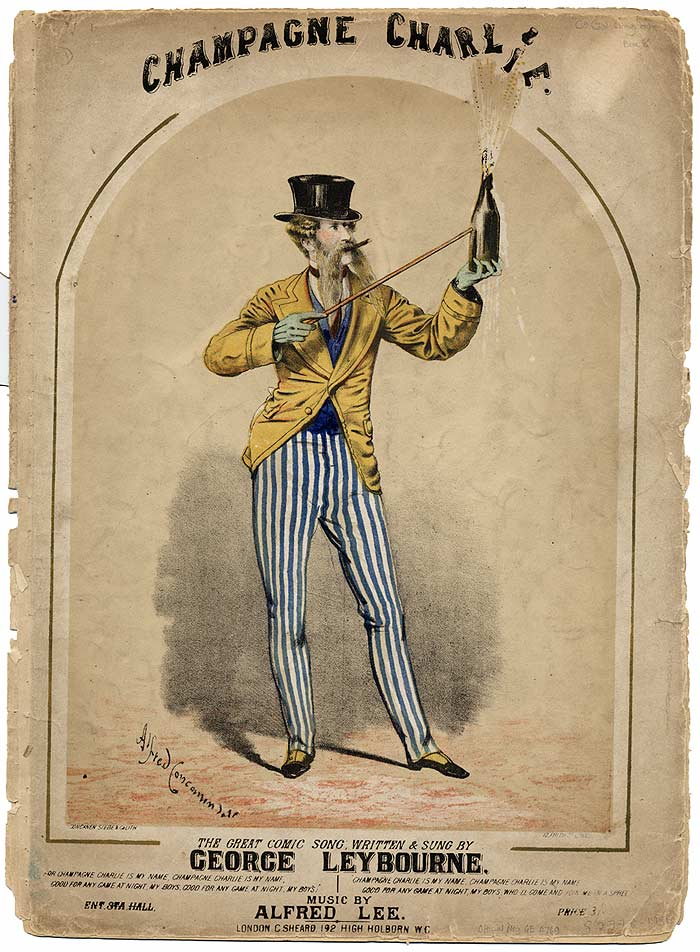
Concanen's 1867 design for Champagne Charlie, sung by George Leybourne

Alfred Concanen (c. 1835 – 10 December 1886) was, for over twenty-five years, one of the leading lithographers of the Victorian era, best remembered for his illustrated sheet music covers for songs made popular by famous music hall performers of the time. These covers usually featured portraits of the performers or humorous scenes from their songs. Sacheverell Sitwell said of him, "The most painstaking of the Pre-Raphaelites must fail beside Concanen!"

== Biography ==
His family originated from the borders of County Roscommon and County Galway, while one of his ancestors was a well-known artist in that area in the 1760s. His parents were Edward John Concanen (c. 1814–1868), a portrait painter in Ireland in the early decades of the 19th century, and Mary Ann Concanen (née Burgess) (1815–1884).

Alfred Concanen was born in the High Street in Nottingham. Described as "slight of build with a fair full moustache, something of a dandy, good natured, generous, a play copy of the lions comiques whom he immortalised in his lithographs", for a period he was a staff illustrator for the Illustrated Sporting and Dramatic News where he sometimes used photographs (which could not be reproduced in the newspapers or magazines of the time) as a basis for his illustrations. At other times he might be seen in a theatre sketching a scene from a new comic opera or in a music hall drawing a performer such as Jenny Hill or Nellie Farren for a sheet music cover.

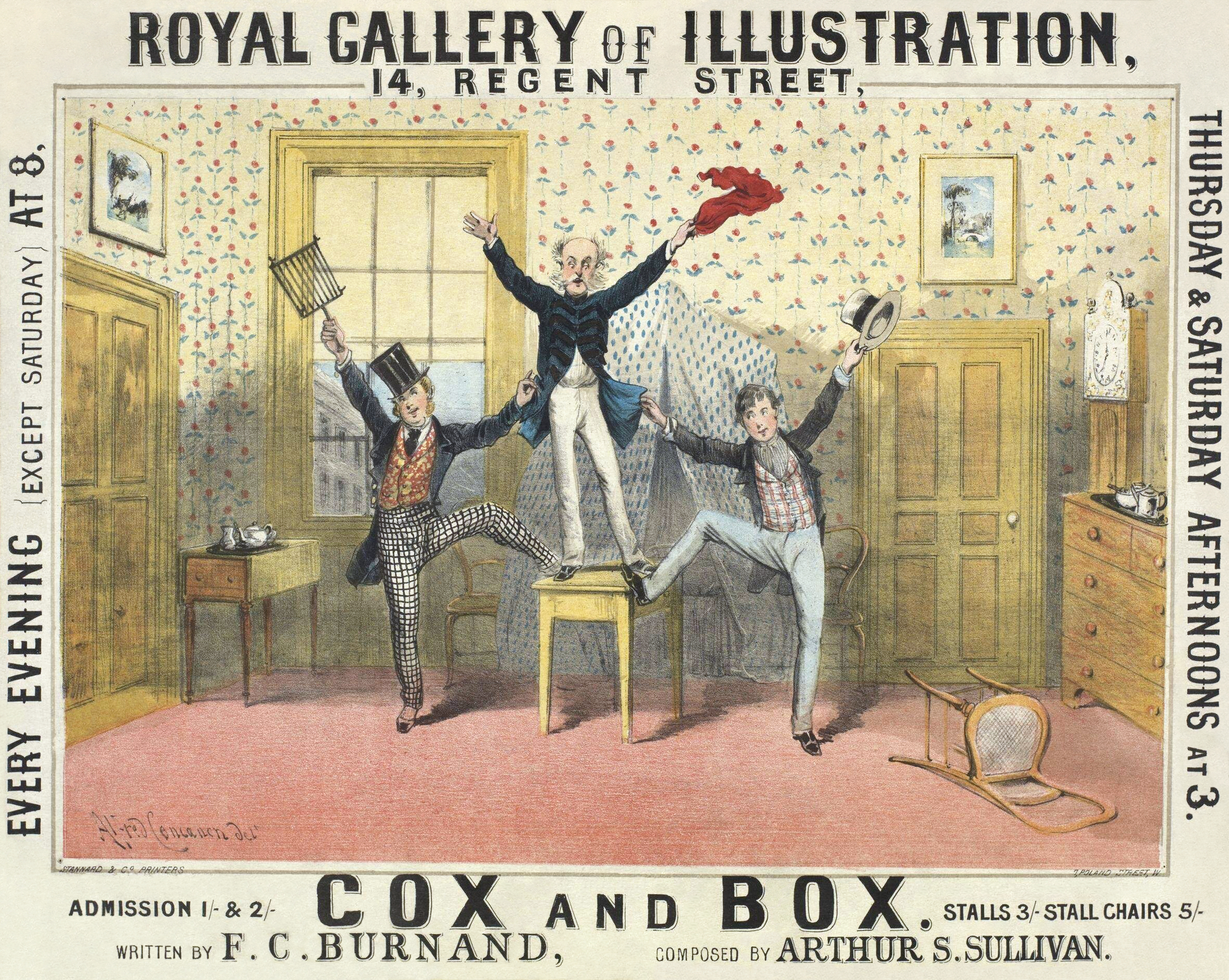
Poster for Cox and Box (1869)

Concanen made his sheet music debut in 1860, succeeding John Brandard as master of that art form, a position he held until his own death twenty-six years later. The 1860s were the peak of British music hall tradition and gave rise to the lion comique – such song and 'patter' performers as George Leybourne ('Champagne Charlie'), Alfred Vance – billed as 'The Great Vance', and G. H. MacDermott were hugely popular, and Concanen captured both their acts and their personalities in his beautifully executed lithographs.

During his career Concanen probably created thousands of designs for sheet music covers, usually charging between two and twenty guineas each, depending on the work involved and the amount of detail desired by the publishers. In addition, in 1869 he illustrated Carols of Lockayne by H. S. Leigh; in 1874 The Wilds of London and, in 1876 Low Life Depths, both by James Greenwood. He also designed a number of theatre posters. He was a member of the London Irish Rifles.

The theatrical designer Edward Gordon Craig, the son of the noted actress Ellen Terry, recalled meeting Concanen in a tavern in the Strand near to the Lyceum Theatre, where the sixteen-year-old Craig was working for Henry Irving. Craig may have been the last person to see Concanen alive, because he died that evening, 10 December 1886, in Marylebone.

Comprehensive collections of his sheet music covers are held by the Victoria & Albert Museum and the British Library, among others.

== Family life ==
On 8 September 1858 Concanen married the 18-year-old Mary Anne Tholen (born April 1840) at a registry office in London. They lived at 43 Bloomsbury Street in London, while his studio was at 12 Frith Street in Soho. According to the 1861 census, by that year Concanen was living in 66 Greek Street in Soho with his wife and two children, Eleanor Maud Concanen (born 1859), and Hugh Tholen Transton Concanen (1861–1917); his occupation was listed as a 'Lithographic Artist'.

Later, at their home in St. Mary Square in Lambeth, more children were born: Georgina Susane Concanen (1863–1869), George William Concanen (1864), Kate A. Concanen (c.1864 ), Barry Percy Concanen (1865), and Violet Eileen Concanen (1874). According to the 1881 census, by that time Concanen was married to Ellen (1856–1916).

He had two grandsons from his daughter Violet Eileen, the actors Derrick De Marney and Terence De Marney.

== Gallery ==
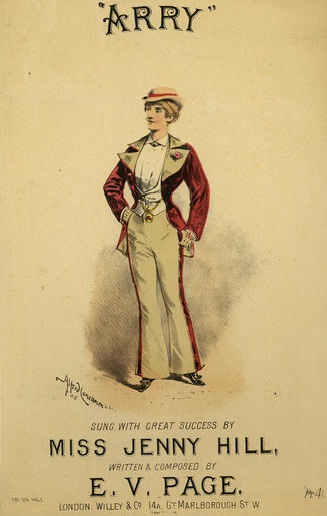
Cover for 'Arry (1882) - sung by Jenny Hill

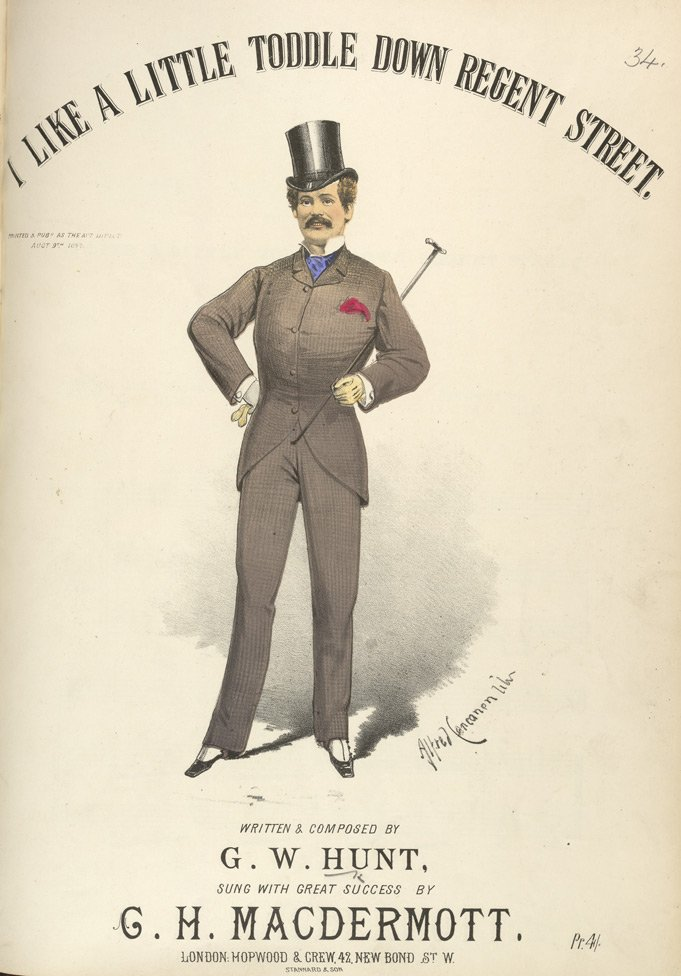
Cover for I Like A Little Toddle Down Regent Street (1882) - sung by G. H. MacDermott

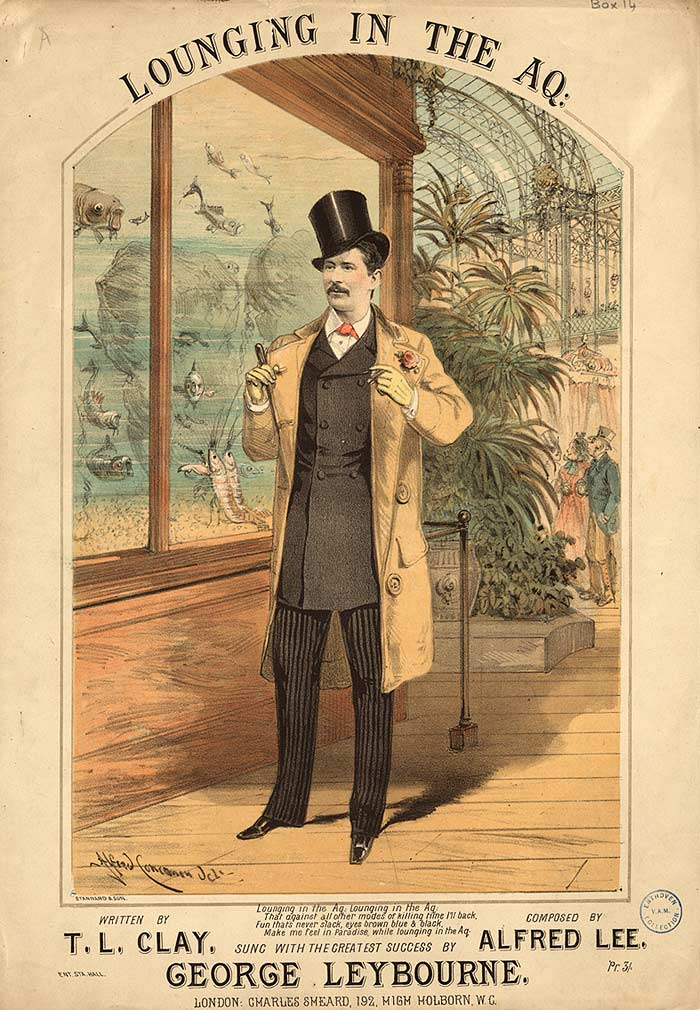
Cover for Lounging in the Aq. (1880) - sung by George Leybourne

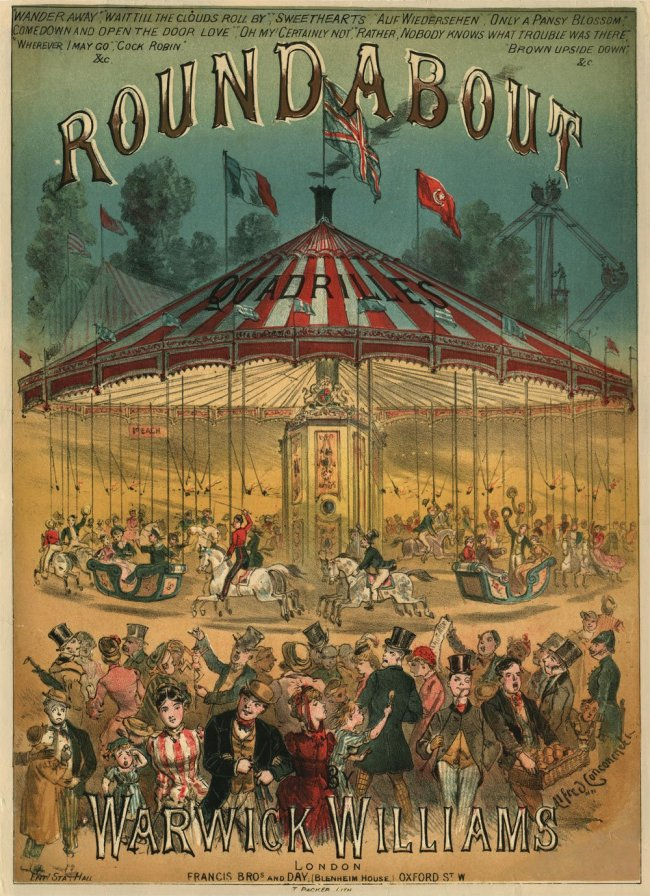
Cover for Roundabout Quadrilles by Warwick Williams (1885)

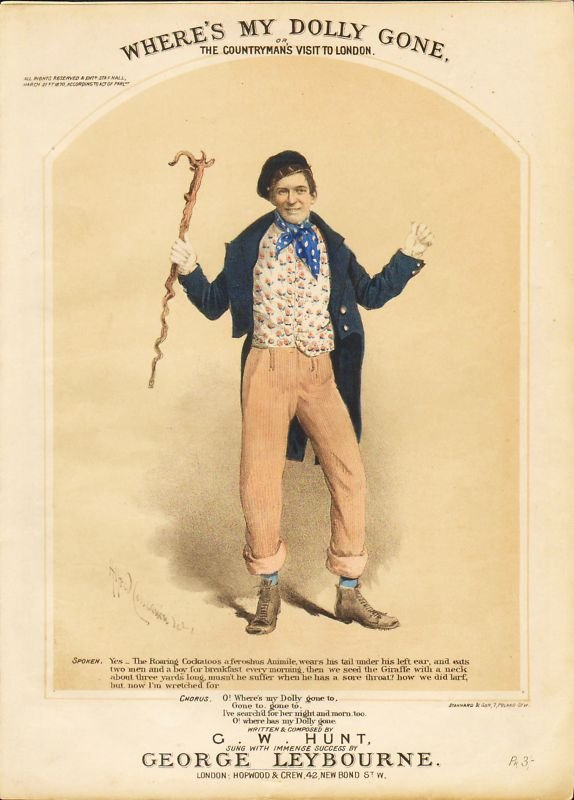
Cover for Where's My Dolly Gone (1870) - sung by George Leybourne

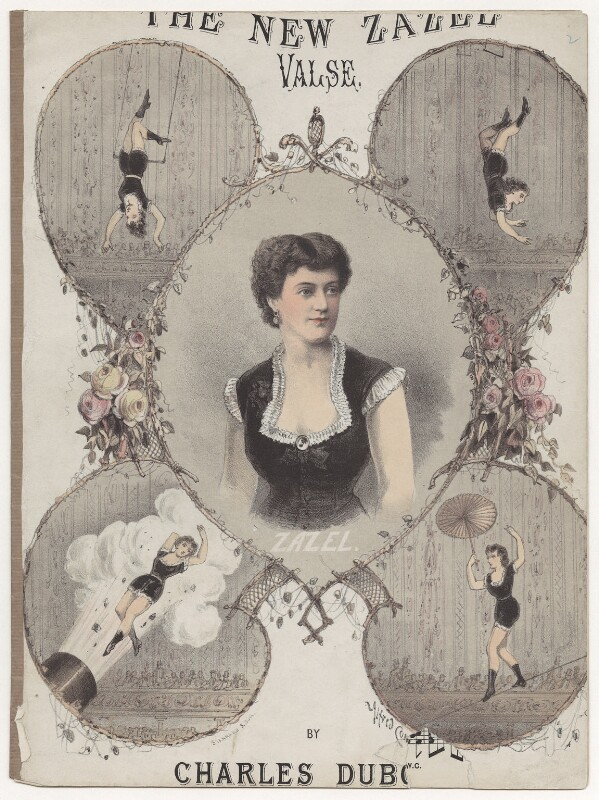
Poster advertising Rossa Matilda Richter's circus show at the Royal Aquarium

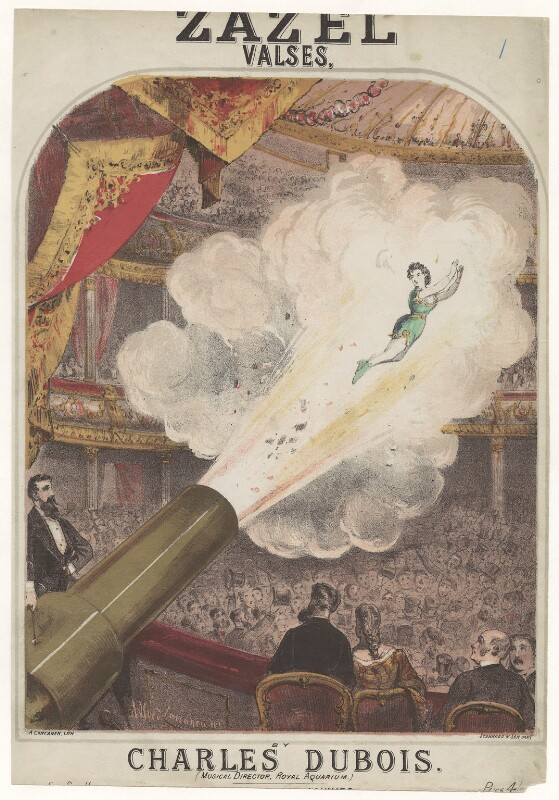
Poster advertising Rossa Matilda Richter's circus show at the Royal Aquarium

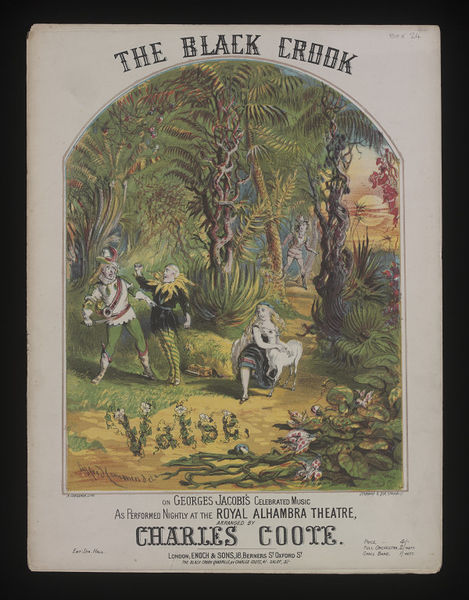
Sheetmusic cover for The Black Crook by Georges Jacobi (1872)
