= Champagne Charlie (album) =

Studio album by Leon Redbone
- Released: 1978
- Studio: Regent, NYC
- Genre: Ragtime, blues
- Length: 31:50
- Label: Warner Bros.
- Producer: Joel Dorn

Leon Redbone chronology
Double Time (1977)	Champagne Charlie (1978)	From Branch to Branch (1981)

Music video
- Leon Redbone- Big Bad Bill (Is Sweet William Now) on YouTube

Champagne Charlie is an album by Leon Redbone, released in 1978. It peaked at No. 163 on the Billboard Pop Albums chart.

== Critical reception ==
Professional ratings
Review scores
Source	Rating
AllMusic	4.5/5 stars
MusicHound Folk: The Essential Album Guide	3.5/5 stars

The Lincoln Journal Star wrote that Redbone's "voice buzzes along like a somnolent bee crooning an after dinner song."

== Track listing ==
Side A

1. "Champagne Charlie" (Alfred Lee, George Leybourne) – 2:52
2. "Please Don't Talk About Me When I'm Gone" (Sidney Clare, Sam Stept) – 2:52
3. "Sweet Sue, Just You" (Will Harris, Victor Young) – 2:41
4. "The One Rose (That's Left in My Heart)" (Del Lyon, Lani McIntire) – 4:32
5. "Alabama Jubilee" (George L. Cobb, Jack Yellen) – 1:42

Side B

1. "Big Bad Bill (Is Sweet William Now)" (Milton Ager, Jack Yellen) – 3:15
2. "Yearning (Just for You)" (Joe Burke, Benny Davis) – 2:48
3. "If Someone Would Only Love Me" (Jelly Roll Morton) – 3:31
4. "I Hate a Man Like You" (Morton) – 3:41
5. "T.B. Blues" (Jimmie Rodgers) – 3:56

== Personnel ==
Musicians

- Leon Redbone – vocals, guitar
- Ken Whiteley – banjo, washboard
- Eddie Davis – drums
- George Marge – ocarina
- Leon McAuliffe – pedal steel guitar
- Eurreal Montgomery – piano
- Sammy Price – piano
- Jonathan Dorn – tuba
- Dennis Drury – trombone
- Tom Evans – clarinet
- Chris Whiteley – trumpet, bass
- Vince Giordano – tuba, bass sax
- Julien Barber – violin
- Selwart Clarke – viola
- Kathryn Kienke – violin
- Regis Landiorio – violin
- Kermit Moore – cello
- William S. Fischer – strings

Technical

- Joel Dorn – producer
- Kathy Tufaro – assistant producer
- Hal Willner – associate producer
- John Cabalka – art direction
