= G. H. MacDermott =

English singer (1845–1901)

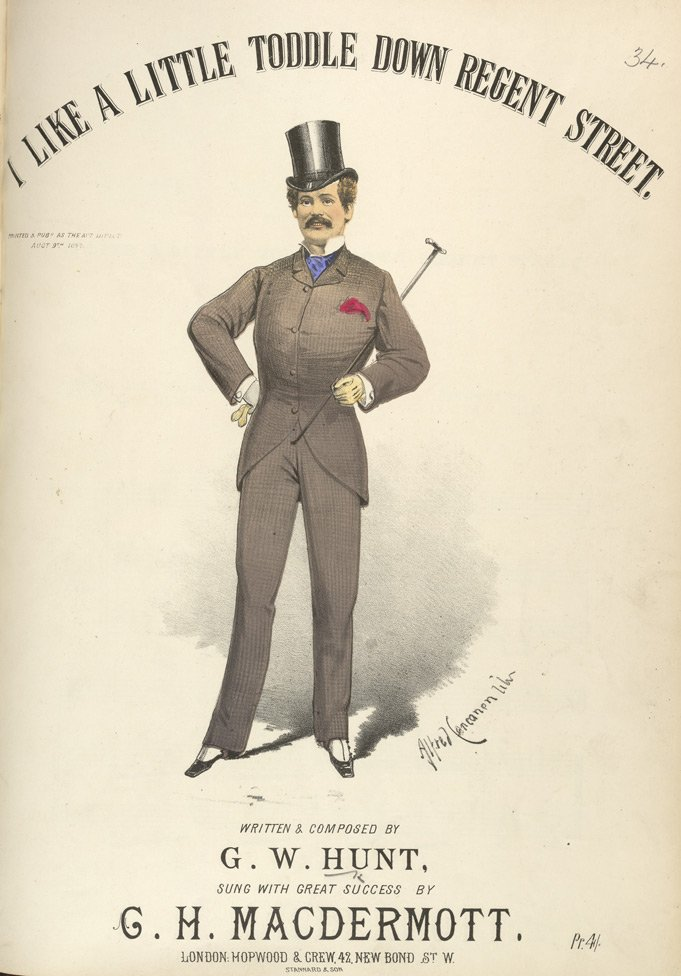
G. H. MacDermott on a sheet music cover by Alfred Concanen (1882)

Gilbert Hastings MacDermott (born John Farrell; 27 February 1845 – 8 May 1901) was an English comic singer or lion comique, who was one of the biggest stars of the Victorian English music hall. He performed under the name of The Great MacDermott, and was well known for his rousing rendition of the song known from its chorus as "By Jingo!".

== Biography ==
MacDermott was born in Islington in 1845, as John Farrell. His parents were Patrick Farrell, an Irish bricklayer, and Mary McDermott, also from Ireland, a laundress. He had left home by 1861 to join the navy, where he started to perform as an entertainer. Back in London in 1866 he married Mary Ann Stradwick, with whom he had a son. He became an actor at the Grecian Theatre in Shoreditch using the stage name Gilbert Hastings before adding his mother's maiden name and becoming known as G. H. Macdermott. In 1872 he wrote an adaptation of Charles Dickens' Edwin Drood for the theatre.

He started performing in music halls in 1874, with the song "If Ever There Was a Damned Scamp", but had his greatest success in 1878 with the song "By Jingo", also known as "Macdermott's War Song". The song was written at the time of the Great Eastern Crisis and the threat of all-out war between Russia and Turkey. MacDermott was persuaded to buy the song from G. W. Hunt for one guinea, and became well known for his rousing rendition. Its chorus of "We don't want to fight but by jingo if we do, We've got the ships, we've got the men, and got the money too!" introduced the word jingoism into the English language. The song became hugely popular, so much so that the Prince of Wales, the future King Edward VII, had MacDermott sing it for him at a private audience. The war song was brought back several times by other artists and was sung in an altered version during the First World War.

MacDermott also performed other songs, including "True Blues, Stand By Your Guns", and "Charlie Dilke Upset the Milk", about the notorious Dilke divorce case of 1885. In about 1883 he started living in Lambeth with a young actress, Annie Milburn, daughter of actor James Hartley Milburn, and had another four children, all of whom adopted his stage name of MacDermott.

He later became a successful theatrical agent and managed several famous music halls. He died in 1901 from cancer at the age of 56.

His youngest child, Annie Louise Mary MacDermott, later became a stage star by the name of Ouida MacDermott. In an obituary on 9 May 1901, The Daily Telegraph called G. H. MacDermott the last lion comique, artists whose stage appearance resplendent in evening dress contrasted with the cloth cap image of most of their music hall contemporaries. The MacDermott family grave is at West Norwood Cemetery. Ouida is buried in the Roman Catholic Churchyard at Old Hall Green, Hertfordshire.
