= Lion comique =

Type of entertainer in Victorian music halls

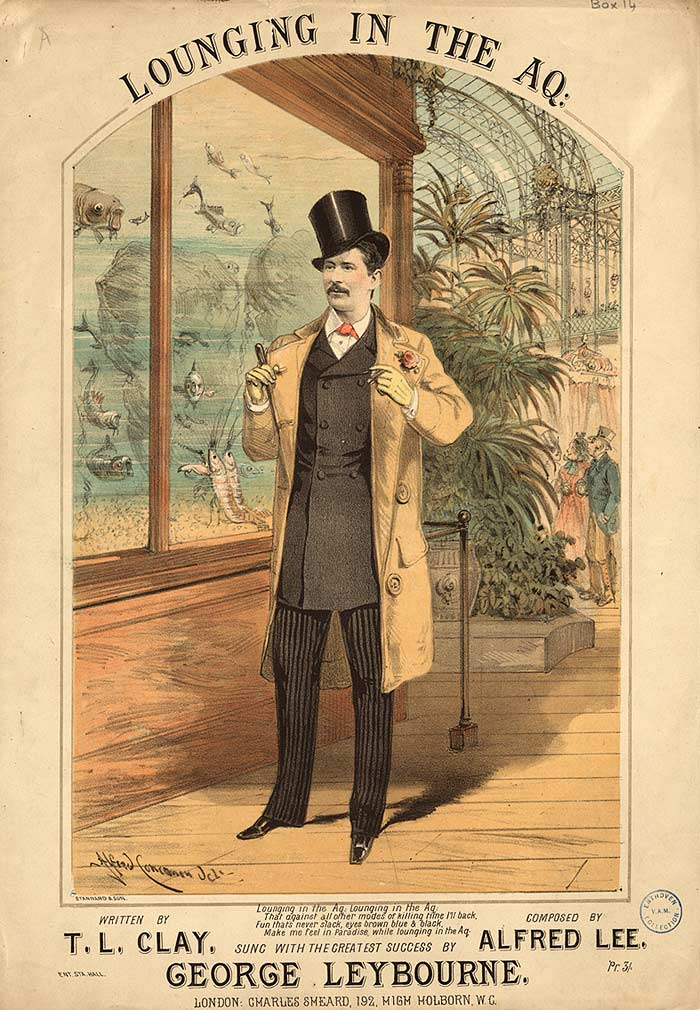
George Leybourne, one of the first lions comiques, on a sheet music cover by Alfred Concanen

The lion comique was a type of popular entertainer in the Victorian music halls, a parody of upper-class toffs or "swells" made popular by Alfred Vance and G. H. MacDermott, among others. They were artistes whose stage appearance, resplendent in evening dress (generally white tie), contrasted with the cloth-cap image of most of their music-hall contemporaries.

According to Michael Kilgarriff, it was J. J. Poole, manager of the South London Music Hall, who first described the performer George Leybourne as "a Lion of a Comic". Victorian fashion then led to the use of the French words, lion comique, which in turn became a generic term for all performers with an imposing appearance and personality.

The songs the lions comiques sang were "hymns of praise to the virtues of idleness, womanising and drinking", perhaps the most well-known of which is Leybourne's "Champagne Charlie". The lion comique deliberately distorted social reality for amusement and escapism.
