= Robert Brandard =

English landscape engraver & etcher (1805–1862)

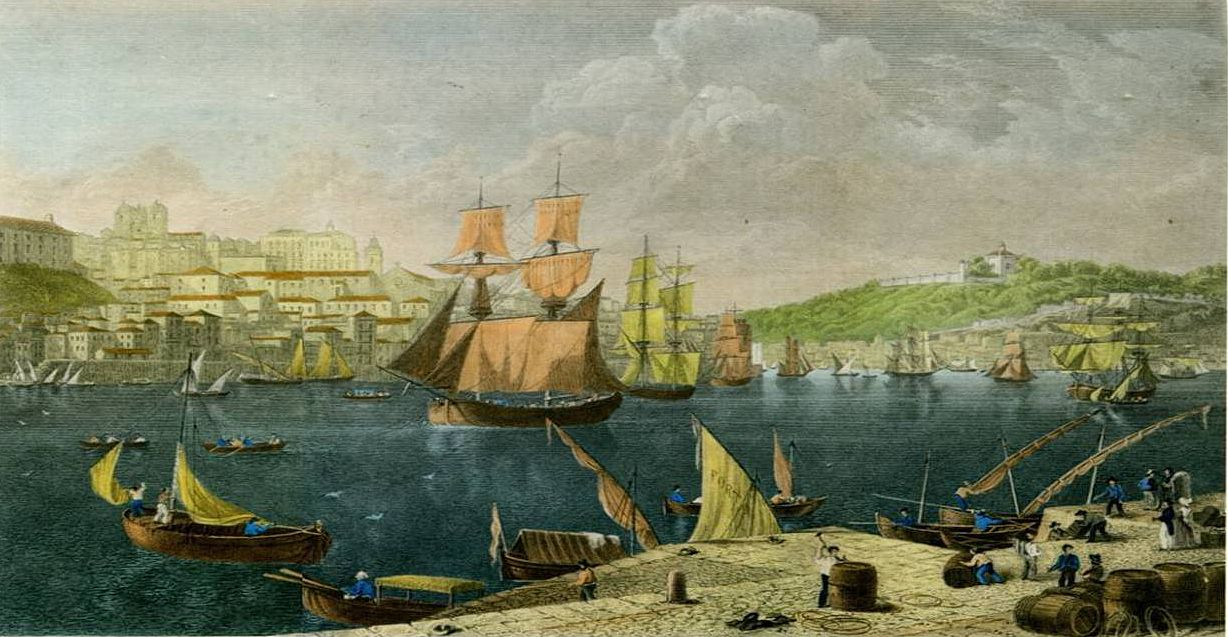
Oporto, from the Quay of Villa Nova, painted by Robert Batty, engraved by Robert Brandard (1823).

Robert Brandard (1805, in Birmingham – 7 January 1862, in London) was a British landscape engraver and landscapist.

Brandard was the eldest son of Thomas Brandard (d. 1830), engraver and copperplate printer, of Barford Street, Deritend, Birmingham, and his wife, Ann. He went to London in 1824, and entered the studio of Edward Goodall, with whom he remained a year. He engraved some of the subjects for Brockedon's Passes of the Alps, Captain Batty's Saxony, Turner's England and Wales and English Rivers, and numerous plates for The Art Journal, after Turner, Stanfield, Callcott, Herring, and others. His most important engravings on a large scale were Turner's Crossing the Brook, "The Snow-storm", and ,The Bay of Baiae. He also published two volumes of etchings, chiefly landscapes, after his own designs. He occasionally exhibited small oil pictures at the British Institution, which were distinguished by a good feeling for nature and a healthy tone of colour. The watercolour "Rocks at Hastings" is in the Victoria and Albert Museum.

His brother John Brandard was a lithograph artist who designed many illustrated title-pages for music. His younger brother, Edward Paxman Brandard (1819–1898) was apprenticed to him while in Islington, London. Several plates by Edward also appeared in The Art Journal between 1853 and 1887. Another engraver who studied with Robert Brandard was Joseph Clayton Bentley.
