= Joseph Clayton Bentley =

English painter

Joseph Clayton Bentley (1809 – 9 October 1851) was a British engraver and painter.

== Life ==
Bentley was born at Bradford, Yorkshire. He began his artistic career as a landscape-painter, but in 1832 he went to London, where he studied engraving under Robert Brandard.

== Works ==
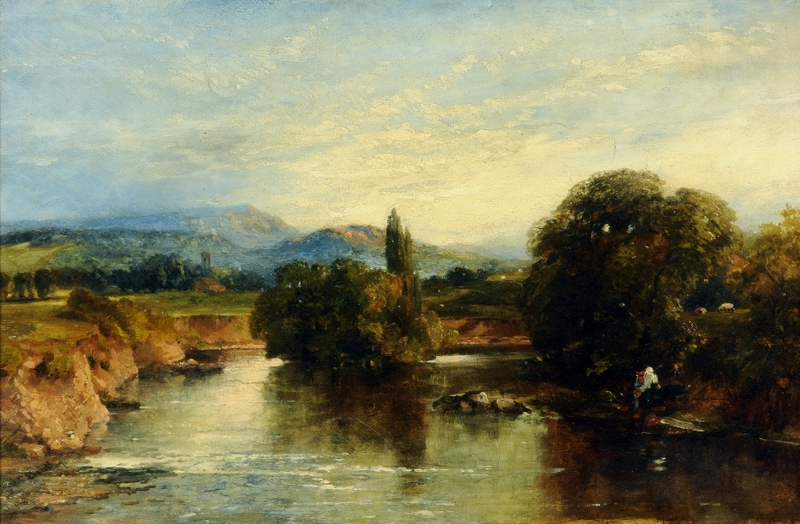
River Aire, near Appleby, Yorkshire, by Joseph Clayton Bentley

Bentley's engravings included plates for the publications of Fisher, Son & Co.; George Virtue, for whose Gems of European Art, he engraved The Fountain after Francesco Zuccarelli, and A Sunny Day after Cuyp; and for The Art Journal. He also produced work for the Vernon Gallery: The Brook by the Way, after Thomas Gainsborough; Lake Avernus, after Richard Wilson; The Valley Farm after John Constable; The Windmill, after John Linnell; The Way to Church, after Thomas Creswick; and The Wooden Bridge, the Port of Leghorn, and Sea-shore in Holland, after Augustus Wall Callcott. He worked quickly, and was exceptionally prolific.

Bentley continued to paint in parallel with his career as an engraver. From 1833 onwards he occasionally exhibited landscapes, mainly views in Yorkshire, at the Royal Academy, the British Institution, the Society of British Artists, and in the provinces.

== Death ==
He died at Sydenham on 9 October 1851. The Art Journal noted:

The indefatigable perseverance of Mr. Bentley, and his anxiety to attain excellence in whatever he undertook, operated prejudicially, it is to be feared, on a constitution naturally weak, and for the last seven or eight years his health had become very precarious; still he laboured on, and it was hoped that a removal to Sydenham, for the benefit of a purer air, would have arrested, if not entirely removed, the tendency to consumption which his constitution exhibited. Such, unfortunately, did not prove to be the case, though it was not until the approach of autumn that any immediate apprehensions of the result were entertained. During the three months prior to his decease, the unfavourable symptoms rapidly increased till the day of his death, on the 9th of October.

He left a widow and two children.
