= John Brandard =

English lithographic artist

1848 lithograph of Pauline Viardot as Valentine (left) and Marietta Alboni as Urbain in Giacomo Meyerbeer's Les Huguenots, Act 1 scene ix, Royal Opera House, London.

John Brandard (1812 in Birmingham – 15 December 1863 in London) was an English lithographic artist. He designed many hundred illustrated title-pages for sheet music in what Michael Bryan judged "a pretty, though weak, style".

John Brandard was the second of three sons born to Thomas Brandard (d. 1830), engraver and copperplate printer, of Barford Street, Deritend, Birmingham, and his wife, Ann. His older brother was Robert Brandard. John Brandard was baptized on 13 March 1812 at St Martin's church in Birmingham. He began his career as an engraver, mainly of commercial designs. On 17 January 1833 he married Maria Chater at Edgbaston in Birmingham. They had five children, one of whom, Walter Robert Brandard (1842–1869), was also briefly a designer of sheet music covers. He worked in a lifelong partnership with the lithographic printers M. & N. Hanhart, for whom he produced designs for Louis-Antoine Jullien from 1844 until 1856, when Jullien was ruined following a fire which destroyed his entire stock of music.

Brandard took the chromolithograph, which had been first used in connection with music in 1841, to an incredibly high level of sophistication, using half a dozen or more stones to produce a single image, printed on paper of a far higher quality than had been used for this purpose hitherto... The colours red and blue predominate in his palette of the 1840s, along with some exquisitely diaphanous draughtsmanship and plentiful use of gold, especially in filigree borders. This latter was something Brandard may have learned when copying medieval illuminations for the Hanharts' bound music albums. His covers convey an illusion of luxury and refinement, and are clearly aimed at the wealthier sections of society

Brandard employed two full-time assistants, allowing him to produce artwork quickly and prolifically, mainly concentrating on ballet and opera. His portraits of dancers were admired by Degas. He usually charged 20 guineas for his original artwork and lived well from the proceeds of his art. Described as " an imposing, dandified figure", he would often arrive at theatres in Drury Lane or Covent Garden in his own coach and horses. He was succeeded by Alfred Concanen as master of the illustrated sheet music cover.

John Brandard died at his home 8 Southampton Place in Chalk Farm, north London, on 15 December 1863.

Collections of his work are held at Reading University, at the Theatre Museum in Covent Garden, the Victoria and Albert Museum, the British Library at the Bodleian Library in Oxford and the largest collection in America is with Lynch Resources in Edmonds, Wa.
