= Champagne Charlie (song) =

Song composed by Alfred Lee

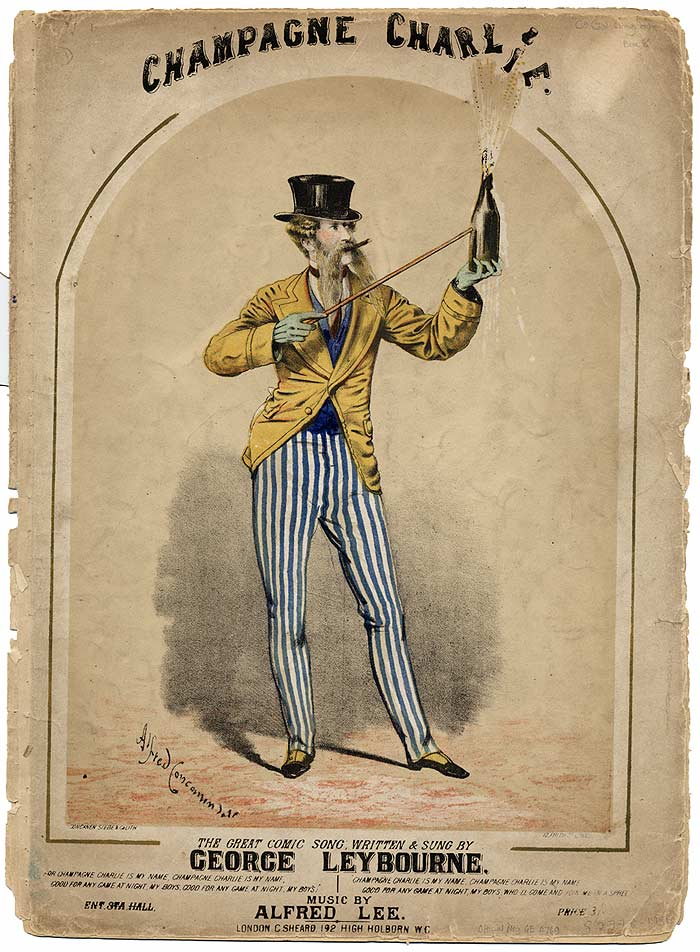
Song popularised by George Leybourne – sheet music cover by Alfred Concanen.

"Champagne Charlie" is a music hall song from the 19th century composed by Alfred Lee with lyrics by George Leybourne. Leybourne popularised the song which premièred in August 1866 at the Princess' Concert Hall in Leeds. For the act, he caused some controversy when he appeared in a cut down top hat, similar to a style worn by the murderer Franz Muller. It was one of Leybourne's most famous songs and he would later be nicknamed Champagne Charlie.

Leybourne's rival Alfred Vance introduced a number called "Cliquot", starting a fierce competition between the two men.

Enthusiasm for the song was increased with its use in November 1866 in the new "Operatic Burlesque" called "The Latest Edition of Black-Eyed Susan", or "The Little Bill that was Taken Up". The song was sung by the crowd at the public execution of Michael Barrett in 1868, the last public execution in Great Britain.

It later featured in the play Champagne Charlie and, with changed lyrics, the 1944 film Champagne Charlie featuring Tommy Trinder and Stanley Holloway. It is also heard as a background song a few times in the Jack the Ripper (1988) television movie starring Michael Caine. It is sung by Miriam Hopkins in the 1931 version of Dr. Jekyll and Mr.Hyde but with the refrain "Champagne Ivy is my name."

A substantially revised version of "Champagne Charlie" was recorded in 1932 by the American blues singer Blind Blake. Blind Blake's version was later covered by the jazz musician Leon Redbone on his album of the same name in 1978.

The melody of the original song was adapted by The Salvation Army for their hymn, "Bless His Name He Sets Me Free".
