= List of British music hall performers =

Performers in music hall, a British entertainment from mid 19th to early 20th century

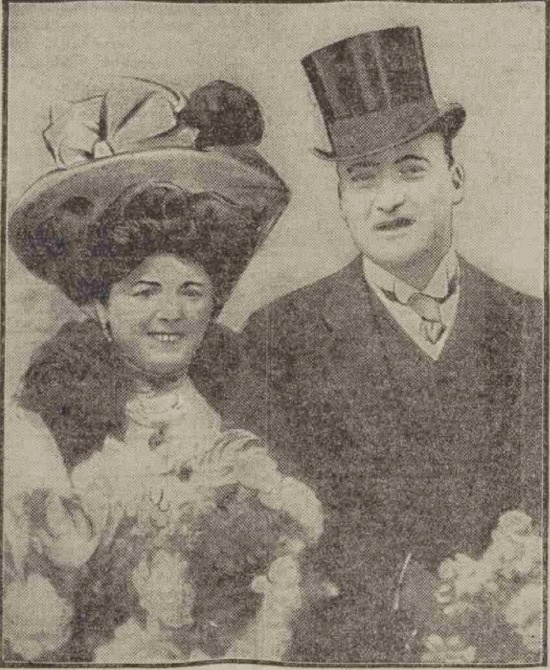
Marie Lloyd and Alec Hurley

This list of British music hall performers includes a related list of British Variety entertainers.

== Music Hall and Variety ==
Music Hall, Britain's first form of commercial mass entertainment, emerged, broadly speaking, in the mid-19th century, and ended (arguably) after the First World War, when the halls rebranded their entertainment as Variety. Perceptions of a distinction in Britain between bold and scandalous Victorian Music Hall and subsequent, more respectable Variety may differ (in the US, Burlesque and Vaudeville have analogous connotations).

== British Music Hall entertainers ==
- Annie Adams (1843–1905)
- Fred Albert (1844–1886)
- Charles Austin (1878–1944)
- Wilkie Bard (1874–1944)
- Fred Barnes (1885–1938)
- Ida Barr (1882–1967)
- T. W. Barrett (1851–1935)
- George Beauchamp (1862–1900)
- Harry Bedford (1873-1939)
- Bessie Bellwood (1856–1896)
- Ada Blanche (1862–1953)
- Bessie Bonehill (1855–1902)
- Herbert Campbell (1844–1904)
- Kate Carney (1869–1950)
- Mrs Caulfield (1817–1870)
- Harry Champion (1865–1942)
- Charles Chaplin Sr. (1863–1901)
- Hannah Chaplin (1865–1928)
- Albert Chevalier (1861–1923)
- G. H. Chirgwin (1854–1922)
- Tom Clare (1876–1946)
- Harry Clifton (1832–1872)
- Charles Coborn (1852–1945)
- Lottie Collins (1865–1910)
- Sam Collins (1825–1865)
- Kitty Colyer (1881–1972)
- Margaret Cooper (1877–1922)
- Sam Cowell (1820–1864)
- Whit Cunliffe (1875–1966)
- Marie Dainton (1881–1938; half-Russian)
- Daisy Dormer (1883–1947)
- Leo Dryden (1863–1939)
- T. E. Dunville (1867–1924)
- Gus Elen (1862–1940)
- G. H. Elliott (1882–1962)
- Kate Everleigh (1864–1926)
- James Fawn (1850–1923)
- George Formby Sr (1875–1921)
- Tom Foy (1879–1917)
- Harry Fragson (1869–1913)
- Will Fyffe (1885–1947)
- Barclay Gammon (1866–1915)
- Gertie Gitana (1887–1957)
- Robert Glindon (c. 1799–1866)
- Charles Godfrey (1854–1900)
- Ernest Hastings (1879–1940)
- Dick Henderson (1891–1958)
- May Henderson (1884–1937)
- Jenny Hill (1848–1896)
- Thomas Hudson (1791–1844)
- Alec Hurley (1871–1913)
- Jack Judge (1872–1938)
- Marie Kendall (1873–1964)
- Hetty King (1883–1972)
- John Labern (c. 1815–1881)
- Walter Laburnum (1847–1902)
- George Lashwood (1863–1942)
- Harry Lauder (1870–1950)
- John Lawson (1865–1920)
- Dan Leno (1860–1904)
- Fannie Leslie (1856–1935)
- George Leybourne (1842–1884)
- George Leyton (1864–1948)
- Letty Lind (1861–1923)
- Millie Lindon (1869–1940)
- Victor Liston (1838–1913)
- Alice Lloyd (1873–1949)
- Arthur Lloyd (1839–1904)
- Marie Lloyd (1870–1922)
- Tommy Lorne (1890–1935)
- G. H. MacDermott (1845–1901)
- E. W. Mackney (1825–1909)
- Clarice Mayne (1886–1966)
- Ernie Mayne (1871–1937)
- Jack Mayne (1887–1963) Comedian (name George Albert Caley)
- Sam Mayo (1881–1938)
- Billy Merson (1879–1947)
- Victoria Monks (1884–1927)
- Lily Morris (1882–1952)
- Jolly John Nash (1828–1901)
- Harry Nicholls (1852–1926)
- Talbot O'Farrell (1878–1952)
- Joe O'Gorman (1863–1937)
- Denise Orme (1885–1960)
- Charles Penrose (1873–1952)
- Mrs F. R. Phillips (c. 1829–1899)
- Jack Pleasants (1875–1924)
- Nelly Power (1854–1887)
- Arthur Prince (1881–1946)
- Harry Randall (1857–1932)
- Ada Reeve (1874–1966)
- Ella Retford (1885–1962)
- J. W. Rickaby (1870–1929)
- Arthur Roberts (1852–1933)
- George Robey (1869–1954)
- Frederick Robson (1821–1864)
- Austin Rudd (1868–1929)
- Maidie Scott (1881–1966)
- Malcolm Scott (1872–1929)
- Jack Selbini (c.1854–1932)
- Mark Sheridan (1864–1918)
- Ella Shields (1879–1952)
- J. H. Stead (c. 1827–1866)
- Eugene Stratton (1861–1918)
- Marie Studholme (1872–1930)
- Randolph Sutton (1888–1969)
- Harry Sydney (c. 1825–1870)
- Harry Tate (1872–1940)
- Little Tich (1867–1928)
- Vesta Tilley (1864–1952)
- Sam Torr (1849–1923)
- Alfred Vance (1839–1888)
- Harriet Vernon (1852–1923)
- Vesta Victoria (1873–1951)
- Harry Weldon (1881–1930)
- Bessie Wentworth (1873–1901)
- Mabel Whittaker (1888–1963) (Dancer) The Rainbow Girl
- Charles Whittle (1874–1947)
- Daisy Wood (1877–1961)
- Wee Georgie Wood (1894–1979)
- Tom Woottwell (1864–1941)

=== British Music Hall entertainers: gallery ===
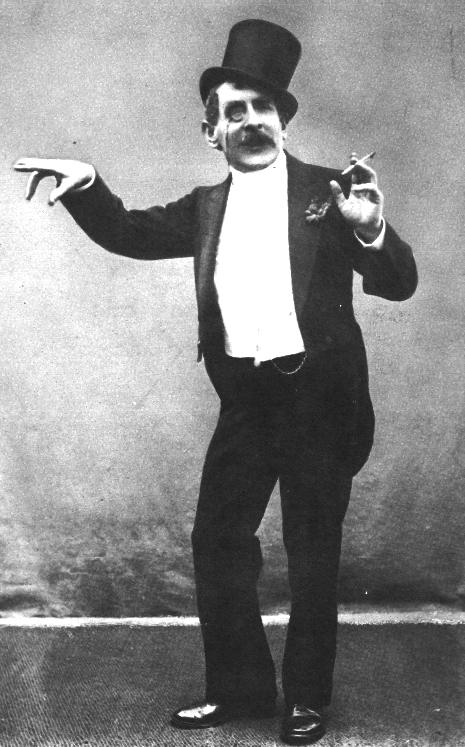
Charles Coborn (1852–1945)

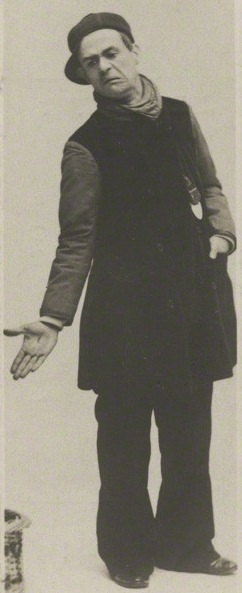
Gus Elen (1862–1940)

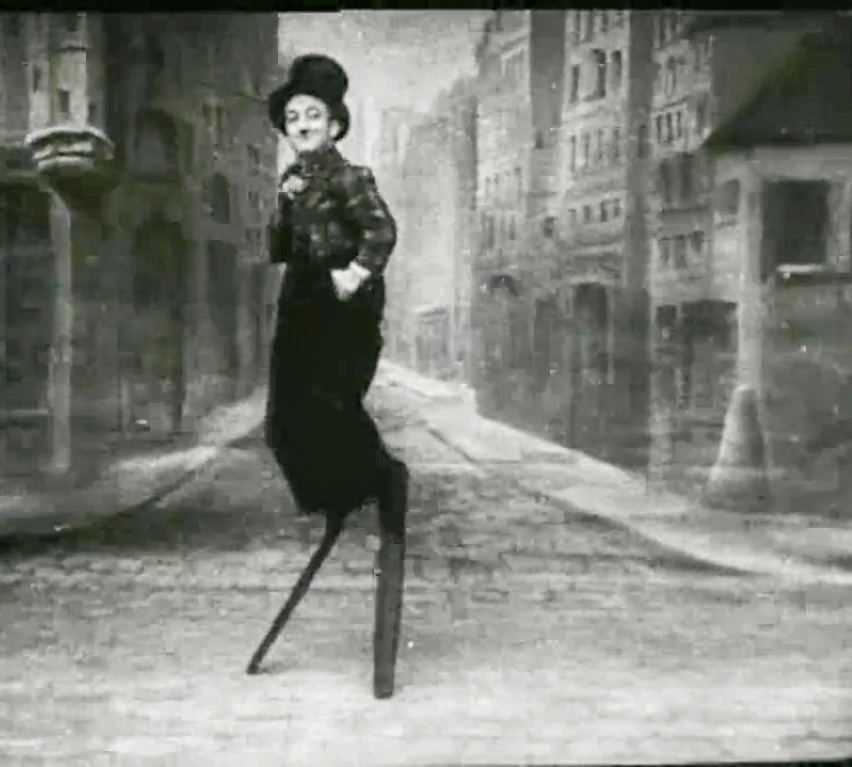
Little Tich (1867–1928)

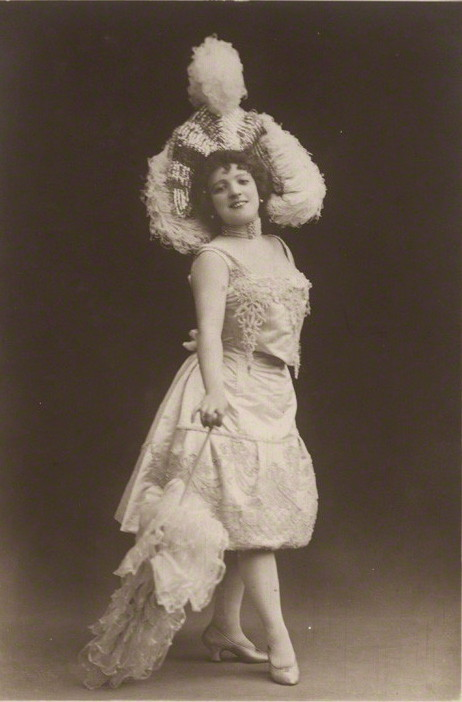
Marie Lloyd (1870–1922)

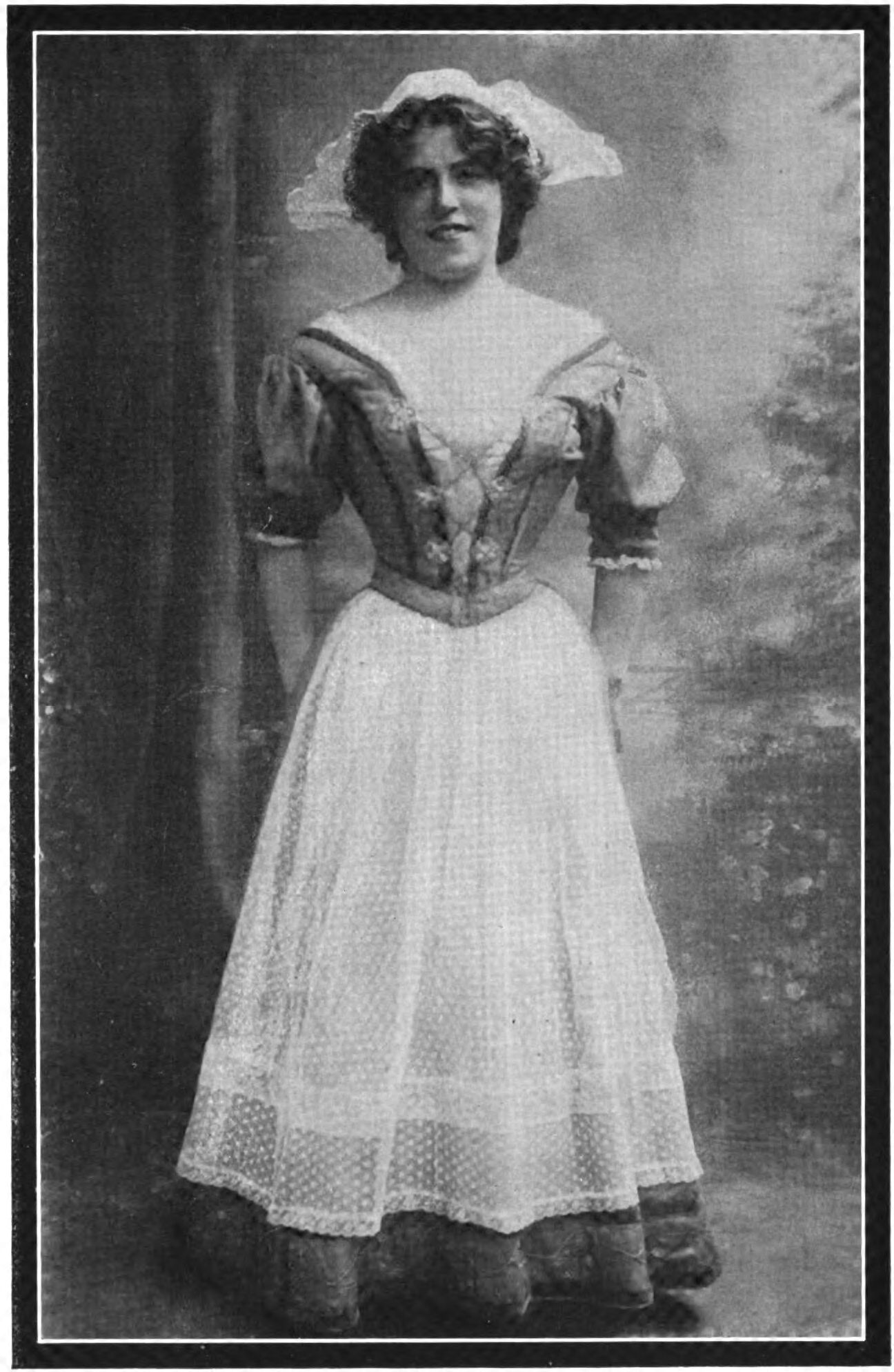
Vesta Victoria (1873–1951)

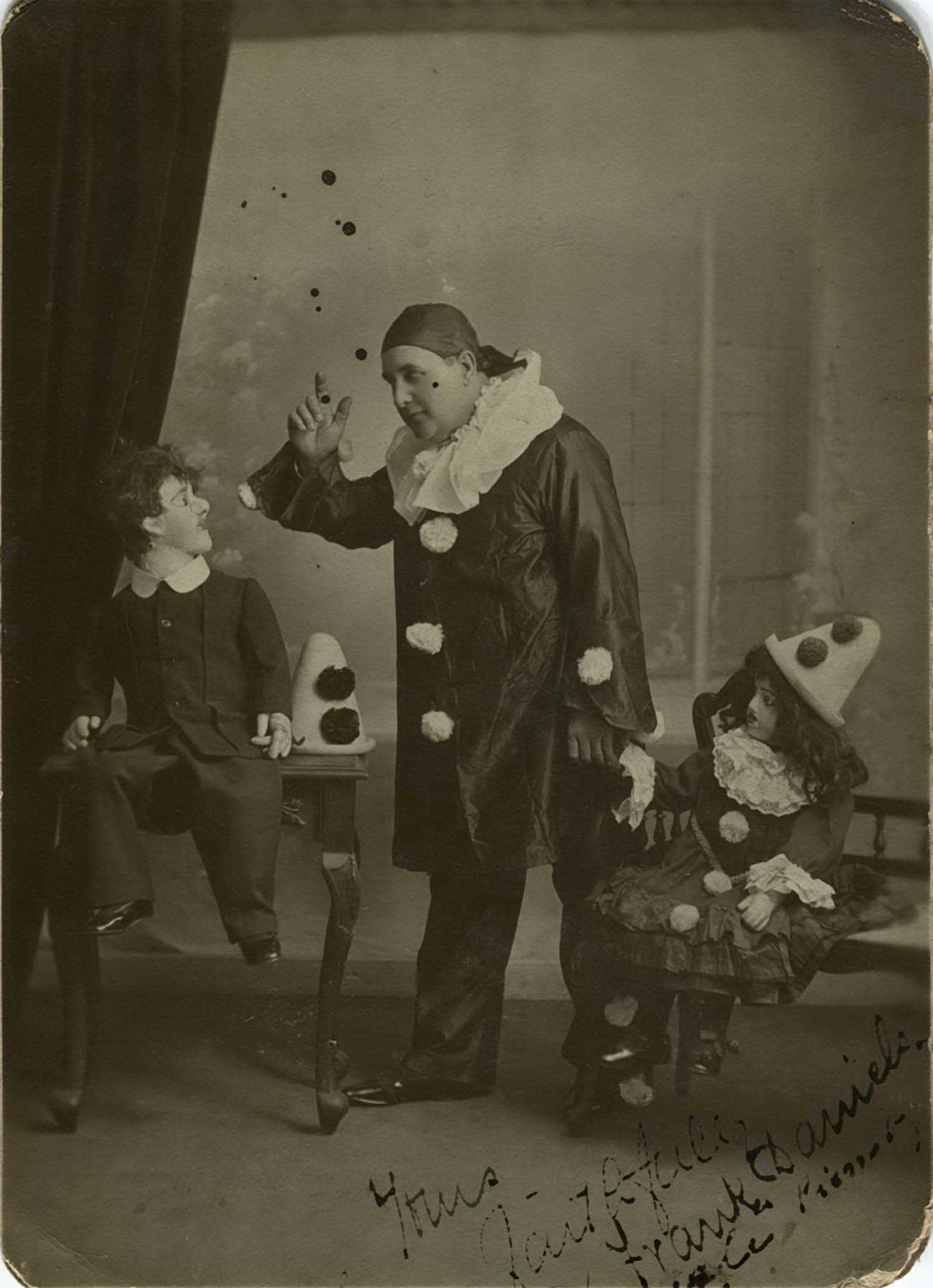
Frank Travis (1854-1931)

== British Variety entertainers ==
- Arthur Askey (1900–1982)
- Billy Bennett (1887–1942)
- Issy Bonn (1903–1977)
- Max Bygraves (1922–2012)
- Charlie Chester (1914–1997)
- Ken Dodd (1927–2018)
- Clive Dunn (1920–2012)
- Sid Field (1904–1950)
- Gracie Fields (1898–1979)
- Flanagan and Allen (respectively: 1896–1968; 1894–1982)
- Flanders and Swann (respectively: 1922–1975; 1923–1994)
- George Formby (1904–1961)
- Bruce Forsyth (1928–2017)
- Dickie Henderson (1922–1985)
- Joan Hinde (1933–2015)
- Stanley Holloway (1890–1982)
- Roy Hudd (1936–2020)
- Jack Hylton (1892–1965)
- Jewel and Warriss (respectively: 1909–1995; 1909–1993)
- Davy Kaye (1916–1998)
- Danny La Rue (1927–2009)
- Kenneth McKellar (1927–2010)
- Max Miller (1894–1963)
- Ivor Novello (1893–1951)
- Joe O'Gorman (1890–1974)
- Tessie O'Shea (1913–1995)
- Bob and Alf Pearson (respectively: 1907–1985; 1910–2012)
- Frank Randle (1901–1957)
- Ted Ray (1905–1977)
- Leslie Sarony (1897–1985)
- Andy Stewart (1933–1993)
- Tommy Trinder (1909–1989)
- Max Wall (1908–1990)
- Jimmy Wheeler (1910–1973)
- Robb Wilton (1881–1957)

=== British Variety entertainers: gallery ===
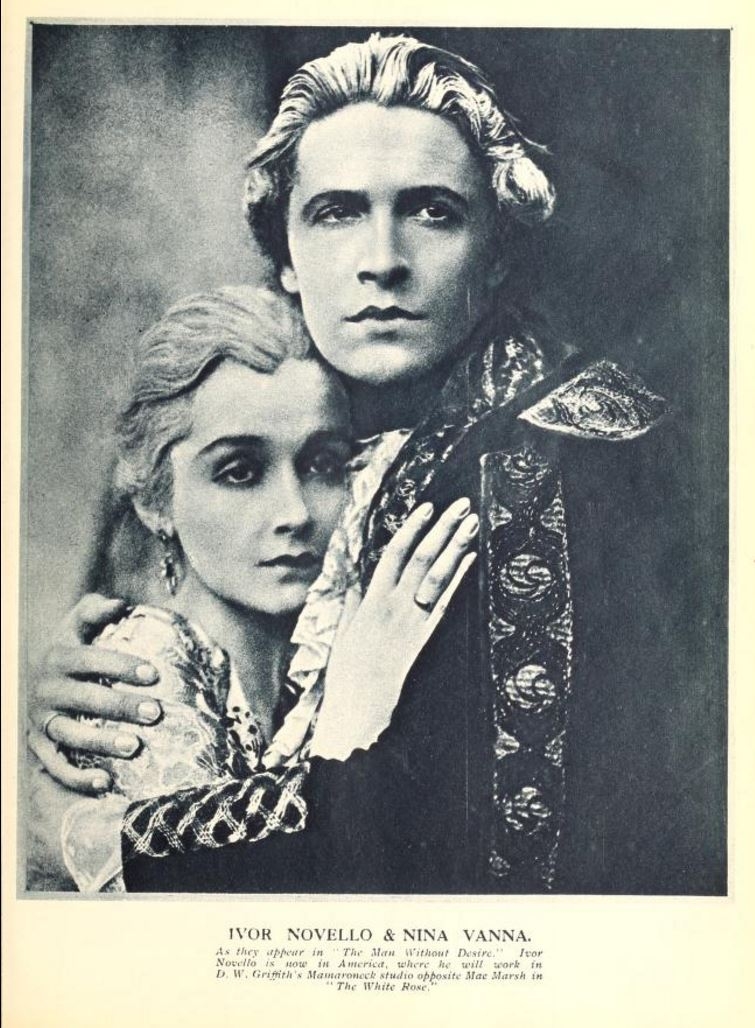
Ivor Novello (1893–1951)

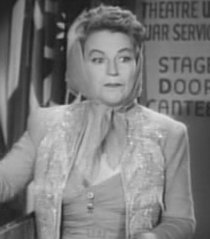
Gracie Fields (1898–1979)

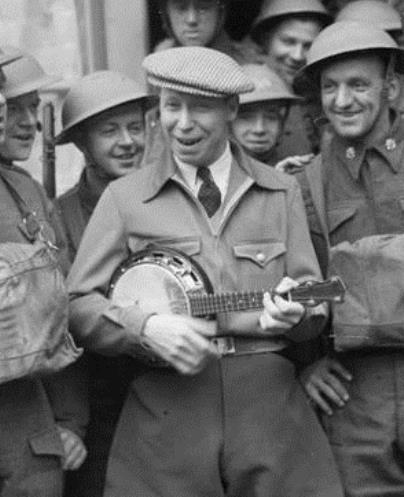
George Formby (1904–1961)

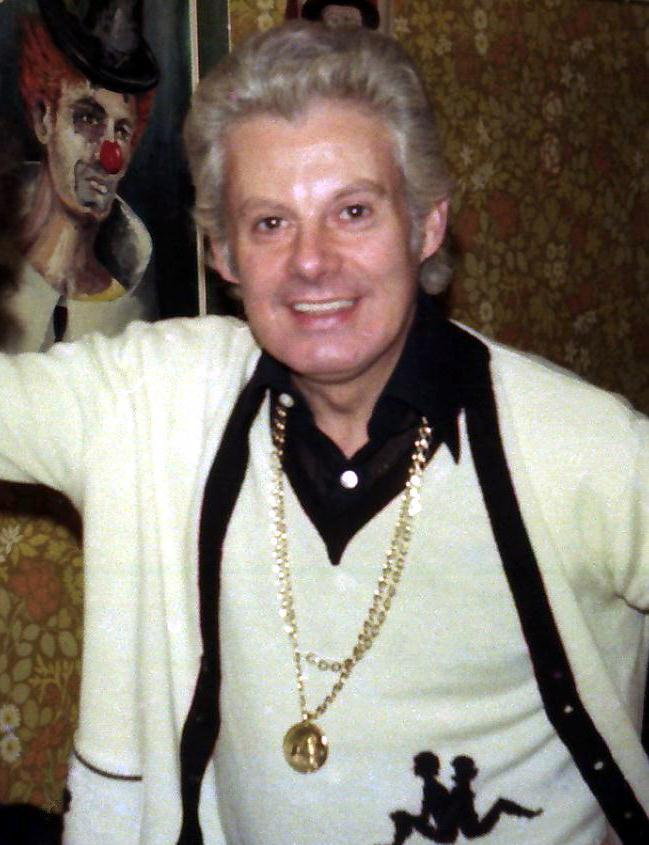
Danny La Rue (1927–2009)

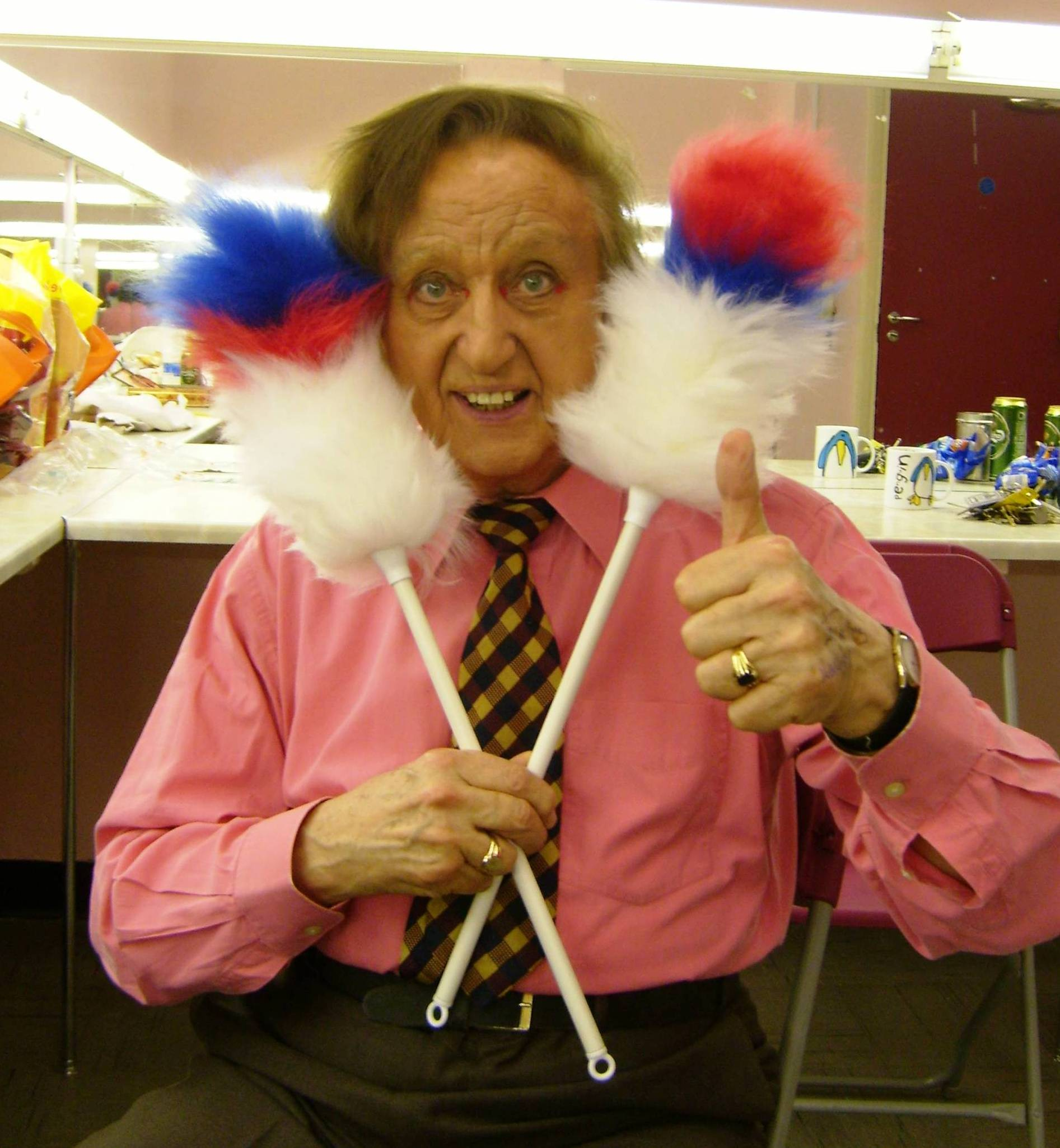
Ken Dodd (1927–2018)

== See also ==
- Music hall
- Music of the United Kingdom
- Theatre of the United Kingdom
