= Mackney =

Mackney is a surname. Notable people with the surname include:

- E. W. Mackney (1825–1909), English music hall entertainer
- Kim Mackney (born 1949), Australian rower
- Paul Mackney (born 1950), British educator and trade union leader
- Richard Mackney (born 1971), English journalist and broadcaster
