= Charles Sloman =

English comic entertainer and musician

- Born: 1808; Westminster, London, England
- Died: 22 July 1870 (aged 61–62); Marylebone, London, England
- Occupations: Comic entertainer, singer, songwriter
- Years active: 1825–1860s

Charles Sloman (1808 – 22 July 1870) was an English comic entertainer, singer and songwriter, as well as a composer of ballads and sacred music. He was billed as "the only English Improvisatore".

== Biography ==
Born in Westminster into a Jewish family originally named Solomon, he began singing in taverns at a young age, and made one of his first professional appearances at the Rotunda in Southwark in 1825. In 1834 he went into partnership with his brother, the actor Henry Sloman (1793–1873), in managing the Rochester Theatre, and four years later was briefly the manager of the Colosseum Theatre in Regent Street. He was also Chairman at the Mogul Tavern in Drury Lane.

He specialised in improvising doggerel verse about current topics or about issues raised by members of the audience. Most popular in the 1840s and 1850s, he maintained a career as a performer for over forty years. He performed regularly at venues such as Evans' Supper Rooms and the Cyder Cellars in Covent Garden, the Coal Hole in the Strand, the Eagle tavern in Shoreditch, the Temple of Harmony in Whitechapel, the Vauxhall Gardens, and the Cremorne Gardens in Chelsea.

The diarist Charles Rice described Sloman as "the great, the Only, extemporaneous singer... his wonderful Genius is one of the most unassuming characters that ever entered the field of Public Criticism...". His popular songs included "Charming Sue" and "Social Bricks". He also wrote songs for other entertainers, including Sam Cowell and J. W. Sharp, and wrote much of the material used by "Chief Lord Baron" Renton Nicholson in his Judge and Jury Society performances. Some sources describe him as the composer of "Pop Goes the Weasel". Thackeray used Sloman as the basis of the character of "Little Nadab" in his 1854 novel The Newcomes.

According to historian Harold Scott, Sloman was "the most respectable, the most ubiquitous and in some ways the most typical of tavern concert artists. As a performer, in spite of certain versatility, he may be regarded as negligible...[But]..it was rather as a personality with the gift of popularity that he succeeded in attaching himself to history."

The majority of Sloman's songs were serious in nature and included religious songs such as "The Maid of Judah", published in 1860 as part of a collection, Sacred Strains, Hymns, etc., as well as romantic ballads. He supported Jewish charities, and in 1866 proposed setting up a provident society to help support entertainers who had fallen on hard times.

His health declined following his wife's death, and he was not given any money from the fund which he had helped set up, possibly because he had received some money from the Freemasons. In 1870, after becoming destitute, he was admitted to the Strand Union Workhouse in Cleveland Street, Marylebone, where he died seven weeks later.
