= Glindon =

Glindon is a surname. Notable people with the surname include:

- Mary Glindon (born 1957), British politician
- Robert Glindon (c. 1799–1866), British singer, songwriter, and scene painter
