= We'll Smile Again =

- Theatrical release poster
- Directed by: John Baxter
- Written by: Barbara K. Emary; Bud Flanagan; Austin Melford
- Produced by: John Baxter
- Starring: Bud Flanagan; Chesney Allen; Meinhart Maur
- Cinematography: James Wilson
- Edited by: Ralph Kemplen
- Music by: Kennedy Russell
- Production company: British National Films
- Distributed by: Anglo-American Film Corporation
- Release date: 7 December 1942 (UK)
- Running time: 93 minutes
- Country: United Kingdom
- Language: English

We'll Smile Again is a 1942 British musical comedy film directed by John Baxter and starring Bud Flanagan, Chesney Allen and Meinhart Maur. It was written by Barbara K. Emary, Flanagan and Austin Melford.

The movie was successful at the box office and encouraged British National to make more comedies.

== Premise ==
A ring of Nazi spies infiltrate a film studio planning to use it for sending coded messages, but they are foiled by two of the low-level staff at the studio.

== Cast ==
- Bud Flanagan as Bob Parker
- Chesney Allen as Gordon Maxwell
- Meinhart Maur as Herr Steiner
- Phyllis Stanley as Gina Cavendish
- Gordon McLeod as MacNaughton
- Alexander Kardin as Holtzman
- Peggy Dexter as Googie
- Horace Kenney as George
- Julian Vedey as Hoffman
- Charles Austin as butler
- Edgar Driver as porter
- Wally Patch as head porter
- C. Denier Warren as waiter
- Gwen Catley as herself, soprano
- Billy Mayerl as himself, pianist
- Henry Hilliard as dress designer
- Robert Brooks Turner as policeman
- Nuala Barrie as councillor's daughter
- Trevor Denis as assistant director
- Charles Doe as cloakroom attendant
- Mary Eaton as continuity girl
- Hal Gordon as customer
- Harry Herbert as brewery gateman
- Gerhard Kempinski as Colonel Roca
- Joe E. Lee as Ginsburg
- Patrick Ludlow as BBC man
- Ruth Maitland as woman in queue
- Andreas Malandrinos as waiter
- Malcolm McEachern "Mr. Jetsam" as himself, singer
- George Merritt
- Ernest Metcalfe as assistant make-up
- Peter Newman as second assistant director
- Hilde Palmer as chorus girl
- Stan Paskin as man in Queue
- Ethel Royale as lady councillor
- Cyril Smith as assistant cutter
- Billy Wells as publican
- Ben Williams as cameraman

== Production ==
It was known as Glamourflage and filming started 4 May 1942. It was also known as Three's a Crowd. The film's sets were designed by the art director Wilfred Arnold.

== Reception ==
=== Box office ===
According to Kinematograph Weekly the film "did not disappoint" at the British box office in December 1942.

=== Critical ===
The Monthly Film Bulletin wrote: "An excellent vehicle for Flanagan and Allen, who play Bob and Maxwell respectively The slapstick comedy is well contrived and the situations are not too utterly impossible. The production includes some good extravaganza scenes in the film studios and the title is well devised. John Baxter's direction is admirable in a type of film with which he is not usually concerned."

Picturegoer wrote: Flanagan and Allen at the top of their form in a film studio spy "extravaganza, which is full of bright gags – some of them old, but none the less funny for that. ... The whole thing is ably and slickly directed by John Baxter who, even amidst his fooling does not forget the occasional human touch which is the necessary condiment for farce.

The Radio Times gave the film three out of five stars, and wrote "Unlike many stage, radio or television double acts who flounder when put on the big screen, Flanagan and Allen fared rather well as movie stars, and this is a typical effort, combining bright comedy with songs and human interest ... Directed with no pretension by John Baxter, who made several of the duo's other popular films, it is an engaging showcase for one of Britain's best-loved song-and-comedy teams."
