= Henry Sidney (disambiguation) =

Henry Sidney (1529–1586) was the Lord Deputy of Ireland.

Henry Sidney or Sydney may also refer to:

- Henry Sydney, 1st Earl of Romney (1641–1704), English politician and army officer
- Henry Sydney, 1st Viscount Sydney of Sheppey from Daniel Finch, 2nd Earl of Nottingham

== See also ==
- Harry Sydney (born 1959), American football player
- Harry Sydney (music hall) (1825-1870), English music hall entertainer
