= Rickaby =

Rickaby is a toponymic surname of English origin referring to someone from the village of Rickerby, derived from the personal name Richard and the Old Norse element bȳ, meaning 'farmstead village'. Notable people with the surname include:

- Fred Rickaby (1896–1941), English flat racing jockey
- Joseph Rickaby (1845–1932), English Jesuit priest and philosopher
- J. W. Rickaby (1870–1929), English comedian
- Rosalind Rickaby (born 1974), English biogeochemistry professor
- Stan Rickaby (1924–2014), English footballer

== Fictional ==
- Roark "Rocky" Rickaby, a protagonist of the Lackadaisy webcomic

== See also ==
- Port Rickaby, South Australia, a town in South Australia
