= Henry Sloman (actor) =

- Born: Henry Solomon; 1793; Rochester, England
- Died: August 1873 (aged 79–80); Rochester, England
- Resting place: West Ham Jewish Cemetery
- Spouse: Eve Barlin (m. 1821)
- Relatives: Charles Sloman (brother)

Henry Sloman (1793 – August 1873) was an English actor, singer, and theatre proprietor.

== Biography ==
Henry Sloman was born into a Jewish family in Rochester, England, in 1793.

Sloman gained prominence as a performer in pantomimes and melodramas at the Coburn Theatre in London, then under the management of Joseph Glossop. He achieved particular acclaim for his portrayal of Watty Wagstaff in Edward the Black Prince.

He retired from acting around 1834, whereupon he became proprietor of the Rochester Theatre alongside his brother, Charles Sloman.
