= J. W. Sharp =

English singer and comic entertainer

J. W. "Jack" Sharp (or Sharpe; c.1818 – 10 January 1856) was an English singer and comic entertainer.

Little is known of his early life. He worked behind the scenes in London theatres in the 1840s, and in the evenings supplemented his income by entertaining in the Vauxhall Gardens, the Cremorne Gardens in Chelsea, and Evans' Supper Rooms in Covent Garden. He also sold copies of his songs. His repertoire included topical and risqué songs, as well as parodies. The impresario Charles Morton described Sharp as "one of the funniest fellows that ever appeared on any stage."

Many of his songs were written by John Labern, often based on ideas suggested by Sharp. He was chosen to open the new season at Vauxhall Gardens in 1845, and worked closely with Labern for the rest of the decade. However, by 1850 his performances suffered from the effects of alcohol abuse, and, according to Morton, he "drifted into becoming a 'tramp' comic singer, making a collection in this or that tavern bar", though he was still performing in 1855. According to Edmund Yates: "No man in my recollection, as a broadly comic vocalist, has been such a favourite as was J. W. Sharp: at Vauxhall and Cremorne in the summer, at public dinners in the winter, and at Evans's always, he was fully employed. But he fell into bad ways, took to drinking, lost his engagements, and was finally found dead from starvation on a country road."

According to contemporary reports, he died in 1856 in the Dover Union Workhouse at Buckland in Kent, an area in which he was apparently well known.
