= John Labern =

British singer and songwriter

- Born: circa 1817; St Pancras, London
- Died: March 1881
- Occupations: Singer and songwriter
- Years active: 1830-1840

John Labern (c. 1815 – March 1881) was an English singer and songwriter whose songs in the 1830s and 1840s were significant in the development of popular music.

He was born and grew up in the Fitzrovia area of St Pancras, London, and performed his songs in the Vauxhall Gardens and song and supper rooms, including the Cyder Cellars in Covent Garden. His songs were widely circulated in periodicals including T. P. Prest's London Singer's Magazine, in the late 1830s, which featured Labern's work prominently. His songs addressed topical issues in a humorous style, and because they were not performed on theatre stages avoided any censorship by the Lord Chamberlain's Office; some would have been considered obscene. As well as performing them himself, his songs were sung by other entertainers such as J. W. Sharp and Sam Cowell. They were published in several volumes, including J. Labern's Original Comic Songs (1842) and Labern's Comic Minstrel (1865).

In 1858, Labern became a tobacconist and stationer with a shop on Euston Road. He died in 1881 and was buried at Brompton Cemetery.
