= Harry Sydney (music hall) =

Harry Sydney (born William Smith, c.1825 – 16 June 1870) was an English music hall singer and songwriter.

== Biography ==
He became a popular performer in London's music halls in the 1850s, writing most of his own material, which included comic, sentimental, and topical songs. He often took the part of an innocent from the country, in songs such as "I'm a Young Man from the Country, But You Don't Get Over Me". He was one of the first attractions at the Oxford Music Hall in Westminster, singing songs including "A Rolling Stone Gathers No Moss", and "Let the World Jog Along".

He was a favourite of both Dickens and Thackeray, and was popular for his songs about the annual Oxford and Cambridge Boat Race, and about the first English cricket tour of Australia in 1862. He toured widely around the country, and appeared regularly at Evans' Supper Rooms in Covent Garden, Weston's Music Hall in Holborn, and the Lansdowne Music Hall on Islington Green. After the death of the proprietor, Sam Collins, in 1865, Sydney took over the running of the Lansdowne for a time. He later became the manager of the Philharmonic Hall in Islington.

He died in 1870, from Bright's disease, aged 45, and was buried at St Pancras and Islington Cemetery.
