= Victor Liston =

Victor Liston (1838 – 11 July 1913) was an English music hall singer.

He was born in London, and made his first stage appearance in 1855 at the Old Bower Saloon in Lambeth. He sang at several of the smaller London music halls, before being based in Sheffield for some time, and touring provincial theatres. He returned to London to perform, and in 1868 had his greatest success with the song "Shabby Genteel", written by Harry Clifton with lyrics by Henry S. Leigh. It was so successful that Liston sang it at the Philharmonic Hall, Islington, every night for seven months, and also at Evans's Supper Rooms, where the Prince of Wales brought the Duke and Duchess of Sutherland to hear the performance. According to W. J. MacQueen-Pope, Liston "not only sang about the sorrows of honest poverty and the attempt to keep up appearances, but he also acted it superbly".

Liston billed himself as "The Robson of the Music-Halls". He went on to tour the U.S., and had other songs including "The Auctioneer's Daughter", “Polly Darling", and "Of Course it’s no Business of Mine", mostly written by G. W. Hunt. In later years, he managed small theatres in Aberdeen, Gloucester and Cheltenham. He died in poverty in London in 1913 at the age of 75.
