= J. A. Cave =

English performer (1823–1912)

- Born: Joseph Arnold Cave c. 1823; Marylebone, London, England
- Died: November 1912 (aged 89); London, England
- Occupations: Singer, musician, theatre proprietor
- Years active: 1830s–1890s

Joseph Arnold Cave (c. 1823 – November 1912) was an English music hall performer, actor and theatre manager. He is credited as the first British banjo player, and as the first to present a minstrel show on the concert (rather than music hall) stage.

== Biography ==
Born in Marylebone, London, he was a child performer on stage. He first performed with a banjo at the New Marylebone Theatre in 1843, the first British performer to use the instrument. Cave described his first banjo, a copy of one used by Joel Sweeney, as "rather rudely constructed, consisting of nothing more than a hoop about four inches wide, with a piece of vellum fastened on with brass-headed nails and a light staff of wood running through the tambourine-like body forming the fingerboard. There were four strings and a smaller one, always tuned to the octave of the key the instrument was tuned in." He was given it by a friend who had obtained it from a theatre in New York City. Cave played the instrument and sang Sweeney's songs at the Coal Hole, a song and supper room in Fountain Court, off The Strand in London. He toured the country as a performer. With E. W. Mackney, he set up a minstrel show, "The Lantum Serenaders", and is credited with introducing minstrel shows to the concert room stage.

From the 1860s, Cave managed several leading London music halls. He was the first to present Dan Leno, in 1864 at the Cosmotheca music hall in Paddington. In 1866, he had a quarrel with Charles Dickens, who had seen and given a hostile review to a performance at the Marylebone Theatre, managed by Cave at the time. The review led Cave to accuse Dickens of being drunk, and Dickens in turn sued Cave. In 1867, Cave took over as lessee of the Victoria Theatre, later known as the "Old Vic". Cave attempted to improve the character of the theatre, writing in his playbills that "any person whistling or making any other disturbance will be expelled by the police". He remained as manager during the time that the theatre was rebuilt and reopened as the New Victoria Palace. In 1872 he took over the Greenwich Theatre.

Cave published a memoir, A Jubilee of Dramatic Life and Incident, in 1894. In 1906, as a widower, he was nominated by the King for a place in the London Charterhouse almshouses. He died aged 89, and was buried on 23 November 1912 in the City of London and Tower Hamlets Cemetery.
