= Charles Austin (comedian) =

English comedian (1878–1944)

Charles Austin (born Charles Reynolds; 4 April 1878 – 14 January 1942) was an English music hall comedian.

He was born in London, and started performing in music halls in 1896, initially as one half of a double act, Lytton and Austin. Inspired by the sight of a redundant police station, he developed a solo act in the character of an inept policeman, "Parker, P.C.", which he first performed at Collins's Music Hall in Islington in 1908. Austin came to be described as "The King of Cockney Humour", and, starting in 1910, he recorded a number of comedy sketches as Parker P.C. With fellow music hall performer Billy Merson, he set up Homeland Films, with whom he made several silent short films, including Parker's Weekend (1916) and The Exploits of Parker (1917), directed by W. P. Kellino.

Austin continued to perform through the 1920s. In 1929, the character was developed into a play, The Adventures of Parker, P. C., of which the Hampshire Advertiser said: "There is no doubt that never before has this great favourite been so excruciatingly, irresistibly funny." He also featured in BBC radio broadcasts during the 1930s, and appeared in two films, Hot Heir (1931) and We'll Smile Again (1942). The 1934 film It's a Cop was based on one of his sketches.

Austin was actively involved in the benevolent charitable organization, the Grand Order of Water Rats, and was "King Rat" for an unprecedented six years (1912, 1913, 1918, 1927, 1928, 1932).

He died in London in 1942, aged 65.
