= Henry Gillard Glindoni =

English painter

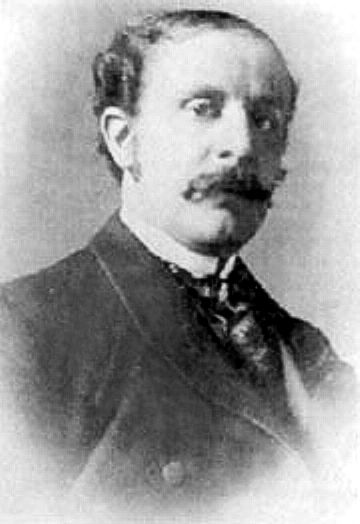
Henry Gillard Glindoni

Henry Gillard Glindoni R.B.A., A.R.W.S. (1850 – 20 November 1913) was a British painter noted for historical genre works.

== Life ==
Glindoni was born in Kennington Lane in London, one of a family of five orphans raised by their grandparents. His grandfather Robert Glindon, who died in 1866 when Henry was 15, was a noted singer and songwriter, as well as a theatrical scene painter.

In 1871, a year before Henry began exhibiting at the Royal Academy he was living with his uncle Frederick Young and aunt Sarah in Kentish Town. Henry is listed as a landscape painter. He learned some of his skills from his grandfather, helping him paint scenes in the theatre. Ten years later Henry was married to Ruth, living in Chelsea and had a six-month-old daughter Esther.

He was drawn into the world of theatre and became a scenery painter further augmenting his finances by sketching the actors with whom he came in contact. He appears to have also designed costumes for London stage productions, under the name "Glindoni" in 1890 (The Black Rover at the Globe Theatre) and "H.G. Glendoni" in 1897 (Nelson's Enchantress, Avenue Theatre) and 1899 (a single performance of Rosemary at the Criterion). He also tried his hand at porcelain painting. Encouraged to study art, he attended Maurice's Working Men's College and the Castle Street School of Art after encouragement from fellow actors to study art.

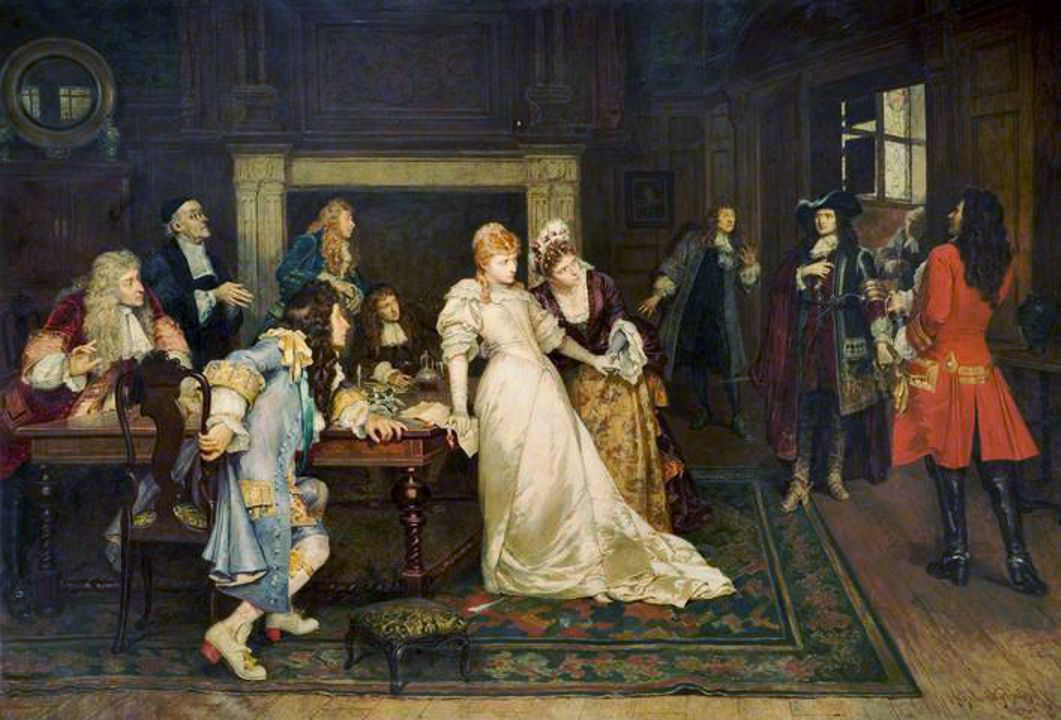
The Bride of Lammermoor (1885).

Glindoni's speciality was that of 17th and 18th century costume and he was noted for his paintings of Cardinals. He frequently exhibited between 1872 and 1904, at the Royal Academy, Royal Institute of Oil Painters, Royal Society of Painter-Etchers and Engravers, Old Water Colour Society, the Society of British Artists in London, and the Royal Society of Artists in Birmingham. He was accepted as a full member of the Royal Society of British Artists in 1879 and an associate member of the Royal Watercolour Society in 1883. He had 79 paintings shown at the Royal Society of British Artists, over 40 works seen at the Royal Watercolour Society, exhibited at the Royal Institute of Painters in Oil, the Royal Etchers Society, at Manchester City Art Gallery, and Liverpool's Walker Art Gallery.

He settled in Chadwell Heath some time after 1891, living in a new cottage which still exists at the corner of Mill Lane and Whalebone Lane North, New Villa. In 1901 he was living at The Studio, Mill Lane, later buying the New Villa on Whalebone Lane with his wife and daughter, now a school teacher, his mother in law Ann Wheeler, sister in law Harriet Cave and niece Alice Cave.

Glindoni died at The Studio in 1913, and is buried in Romford Cemetery along with his wife Ruth. There is no headstone, but just a numbered grave marker. Glindon's work may be seen at Valence House Museum.
