= T. W. Connor =

English Song Writer

Thomas Widdicombe (1865 – 24 January 1936), who wrote under the name T. W. Connor, was an English writer of popular songs and monologues for music hall performers in the late 19th and early 20th centuries.

He was born in Hoxton, in the East End of London. He married in 1885, and according to official records worked for most of his life as an administrative officer in the Port of London. He also had a parallel career as a songwriter, and wrote lyrics and music for over 200 songs. One of his most successful early songs was "She Was One of the Early Birds", sung in 1895 by George Beauchamp (1862–1900). Connor also wrote "A Little Bit of Cucumber", recorded by Harry Champion in 1915 and later revived by Stanley Holloway; "I Had No Mother to Guide Me", performed by George Formby Sr.; and many successful songs by other performers including Gus Elen, Tom Costello, and Harry Randall.

Connor wrote many of the comic monologues performed by Billy Bennett in the years immediately after the First World War, such as "One of the Rank and Vile", "The Poor Hard-Working Man", "The Black Sheep", "Do As You'd Be Done By", and "The Scotch Express from Ireland".

Connor died in Hackney, London, in 1936.
