= Barclay Gammon =

Background information
- Birth name: Charles Blondin Gammon
- Born: 1 November 1866; Lambeth, London, England
- Died: 2 June 1915 (aged 48); Maida Vale, London, England
- Genres: Music hall
- Occupation(s): Singer, comic entertainer
- Instruments: Piano
- Years active: 1890s–1915

Charles Blondin Gammon (1 November 1866 – 2 June 1915), known professionally as Barclay Gammon, was an English entertainer of the Edwardian era.

== Life and career ==
He was born in Lambeth, London, the son of a railway agent, and followed his father into the same employer, as a clerk with the London and South Western Railway Company. He became a church organist and choir master, and joined an amateur operatic company, before he started entertaining on his own account at dinners, parties, smoking concerts, charity events and the like in the 1890s. Accompanying himself on the piano, he introduced topical patter and monologues into his act, and began to appear at music halls and concert halls in and around London.

He became a professional entertainer around 1905, and performed regularly at St George's Hall under the management of John Nevil Maskelyne and David Devant. He toured Australia and New Zealand with Maskelyne and Devant's company in 1908, and was credited with much of the tour's success. On his return, billed as "Barclay Gammon and a Piano" and describing himself as a "Society Clown", he became increasingly successful with his patter and songs, most of which he wrote himself, and performed for some years at the Palace Theatre of Varieties.

Music hall historian Harold Scott wrote that: "..he sang at his piano perched upon a music stool always on the point of collapse, made jokes, gave satirical opinions upon the events of the day and commented unsparingly upon his own prodigious girth; the whole in the breathless manner and rather asthmatical voice, the management of which was the secret of his style."

He made several recordings for Odeon Records, including "Limerickitis", and "Suffragettes' Anthem" (not to be confused with "The March of the Women"), in 1910, in which he was "careful to navigate that narrow line between being offensive and being uncontroversial." On the record, he introduces the song by saying that "the remarks [in the song] do not apply to those earnest ladies who are really earnest in their works, but rather the mountebank militants whose extraordinary antics seem to be alienating the sympathies of most right minded people, I refer to the Suffragettes...". The song itself is a parody of Gilbert and Sullivan's "Three Little Maids Are We" and Vesta Victoria's hit "Waiting at the Church": "There was I waiting in the cold, waiting in the cold, chained up in the cold...".

In July 1912, Gammon was considered sufficiently respectable to be the opening act (other than a pair of acrobats, Pipifax and Panlo) at the first ever Royal Command Performance for music hall artists, held at the Palace Theatre in front of King George V, Queen Mary and Edward, Prince of Wales. He was a Freemason. He continued to perform in London, and in 1914 took part in the inaugural theatre performance held within the new ocean liner, RMS Aquitania, before its first sailing from Liverpool.

Gammon died in Maida Vale, London, in June 1915, aged 48.
