= Song and supper room =

19th-century English dining club

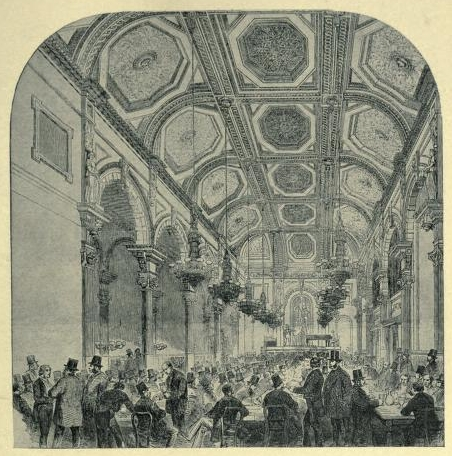
Illustration of Evans Music-and-Supper Rooms from Fifty years of a Londoner's life (1916)

A song and supper room was a type of dining club in mid-nineteenth century Victorian England in which entertainment and good food were provided. They provided an alternative to formal theatre and music hall with a convivial atmosphere in which the customers were encouraged to perform themselves.

== "Free and easies" ==
In the first part of the nineteenth century, entertainment by both professional and amateur performers began to be provided at some taverns. Such venues were known as "free and easies", and it is said that "by and large they were disreputable establishments." There was no charge for entry, but only men were permitted in them. The journal The Town reported in 1837:

The epidemic of vocal music has more particularly spread its contagious and devastating influence amongst the youth of the Metropolis, the London apprentice boys. These young gentlemen generally give vent to their passion and display their vocal abilities in the spacious room appropriated to that purpose of some tavern or public house and these meetings are most aptly denominated Free and Easies: free as air they are for the advancement of drunkenness and profligacy and easy enough of access to all classes of society with little regard to appearances or character.

According to the Scottish comedian W. F. Frame, "a free-and-easy was a happy, go-as-you-please sort of entertainment and a capital preparatory school for budding amateurs."

== Leading song and supper rooms ==
The song and supper rooms developed in London from the 1820s and 1830s, and were an important influence on the development of the music hall tradition. Three of the most significant were:

- The Coal Hole, in Fountain Court off the Strand, described in 1851 as "the oldest and most popular of the singing establishments". In its early days, the actor Edmund Kean was a regular customer. Popular performers included its landlord, John Rhodes; J. A. Cave, a singer who introduced the banjo to Britain; and Joe Wells, according to one critic a "dreadful old creature.. who used to sing the most disgusting ditties". The Coal Hole lost its licence in 1862 and was later demolished for road widening.
- Evans's Supper Rooms in the basement of the Grand Hotel, King Street, Covent Garden. It was established, as "Evans's late Joy's", by William Carpenter Evans, who converted Mr Joy's earlier dining rooms into a song and supper room. Its "Chairman" from 1842 was John "Paddy" Green, and its most popular entertainer in the 1840s was the singer Sam Cowell. Its patrons included Dickens and Thackeray. After Paddy Green retired in 1871, the new owner allowed more risqué performances, including those of Arthur Roberts, and the venue lost its licence and closed in 1880.
- The Cyder Cellars, beside the Adelphi Theatre in Covent Garden, which opened in the late 1820s. Thackeray was again a regular visitor, and described its clientele as "country tradesmen and farmers, young apprentices, rakish medical students, university bucks, guardsmen and members of the House of Lords." It featured "judge and jury" trials presided over by "Baron" Renton Nicholson, which were often parodies of real and current court cases. The Cyder Cellars also featured songs by W. G. Ross and Tom Hudson.

== See also ==
- List of supper clubs
