= Billy Bennett (comedian) =

Scottish comedian (1887–1942)

- Born: William Robertson Russell Bennett; 21 November 1887; Glasgow, Scotland
- Died: 30 June 1942 (aged 54); Blackpool, England
- Parent: John Bennett (father)

Comedy career
- Years active: 1919–1942
- Military career
- Branch: British Army
- Unit: 16th Lancers
- Conflicts: World War I
- Awards: Distinguished Conduct Medal; Military Medal; Belgian Croix de Guerre

William Robertson Russell Bennett DCM MM (21 November 1887 – 30 June 1942) was a British comedian who specialised in parodies of dramatic monologues and was billed as "Almost a Gentleman".

== Life ==
Bennett's father, John Bennett, and his performing partner, Robert Martell, formed a music hall slapstick comedy duo. Billy Bennett trained as an acrobat but was initially reluctant to follow his father on the stage, instead enlisting in the army. Bennett briefly left the army to become a comedian but soon re-enlisted at the start of World War I, where he enjoyed a distinguished career in the 16th Lancers and was awarded the Distinguished Conduct Medal, the Military Medal and the Belgian Croix de Guerre.

In 1919, he began his stage career, appearing with Mark Lupino and in Fred Karno's army. Bennett's favourite act was to mock and parody the dramatic monologues of the turn of the century. Perhaps best known is The Green Tie on the Little Yellow Dog, his take on The Green Eye of the Yellow God. He wrote many of his own monologues, and performed others written for him by T. W. Connor. He also performed songs, many written for him by Bert Lee and R. P. Weston, such as "She Was Poor, But She Was Honest". In 1928, he appeared in a short film Almost a Gentleman, filmed in the DeForest Phonofilm sound-on-film system.

According to Roger Wilmut, Bennett was "one of the most entertaining comics of the period..... [his] style bridged the gap between old-fashioned monologues and the later patter style..". He would end his jokes by saying "boom boom!" – a trick used by later comics and adopted by the puppet Basil Brush. James Agate wrote of Bennett:

Nobody who saw him is ever likely to forget that rubicund, unaesthetic countenance, that black, plastered quiff, that sergeant-major's moustache, that dreadful dinner-jacket, that well-used dickey and seedy collar, the too-short trousers, the hob-nailed boots, the red silk handkerchief tucked into the waistcoat, the continual perspiration which was the outward and visible sign of a mind struggling for expression - these things will not be forgotten.

Off-stage, Agate noted that his manner was quiet almost to shyness, in keeping with his gentle and wholly nice mind.

He appeared at four Royal Variety Performances – in 1926, 1931, 1933 and 1934. In three of those, he gave his usual repertoire, but in 1931 he appeared in blackface. In 1930, when his contracts prevented him from broadcasting under his own name, he adapted his act to radio, appearing with, first, James Carew, and later Albert Whelan, as "two simple coons", the cross-talkers Alexander and Mose. They performed onstage as blackface minstrels in the early 1930s.

Bennett also had a role in Will Hay's 1934 comedy film Radio Parade of 1935. He gave his final performance in Blackpool, a few weeks before his death there in 1942 at the age of 54.

== Legacy ==
Bennett was an important influence on comedians George Formby, Tommy Cooper, Ron Moody, Eric Morecambe, Ken Dodd and Spike Milligan.

== Selected filmography ==
- Soft Lights and Sweet Music (1936)
- Young Man's Fancy (1939)

== Bibliography ==
- Busby, R. (1976). British Music Hall: An Illustrated Who's Who from 1850 to the Present Day. Elek. ISBN 0-236-40053-3.
- Fisher, J (1973). Funny Way to be a Hero. Paladin. ISBN 0-586-08240-9.
- Midwinter, E.C. (1979). Make 'em Laugh: Famous Comedians and their Worlds. Allen & U. ISBN 0-04-792011-4.
- — (2004) "Bennett, William Robertson Russell (1887–1942)", Oxford Dictionary of National Biography, Oxford University Press, accessed 14 March 2006 (subscription, Wikipedia Library access or UK public library membership required)
- Sculthorpe, D. (2021). The Lost World of Music Hall. Bear Manor Media. ISBN 978-1-62933-802-6.
