= Alexander Kardin =

German painter

- Born: Alexander Maria Indrak; 1917; Vienna, Austria
- Died: 1994 (aged 76–77); Munich, Germany
- Education: Academy of Arts, Berlin, Academy of Fine Arts, Munich
- Known for: painting, film art

Alexander Kardin (1917–1994), born Alexander Maria Indrak, was a German painter and film artist known for his landscapes. During his career he worked as a freelance artist as well as for organizations like Walt Disney and King Brothers Productions.

Kardin was born in Vienna to Leopold Maria and Margit Indrak. (His chosen artist name "Kardin" is an anagram of his birth surname.) He studied art in Berlin at the Academy of Arts until the second World War. From 1940 he worked as a painter in the film industry while also pursuing his own personal landscape works. After the war, he resumed his art studies at the Academy of Fine Arts in Munich. In 1965, he dedicated himself to working solely as a freelance artist, exhibiting across Europe and the United States, particularly in Germany and France.

He married Eva Schmuckler in 1945 and the couple had a daughter, Monika.
