= Variety show =

Entertainment made up of a variety of acts

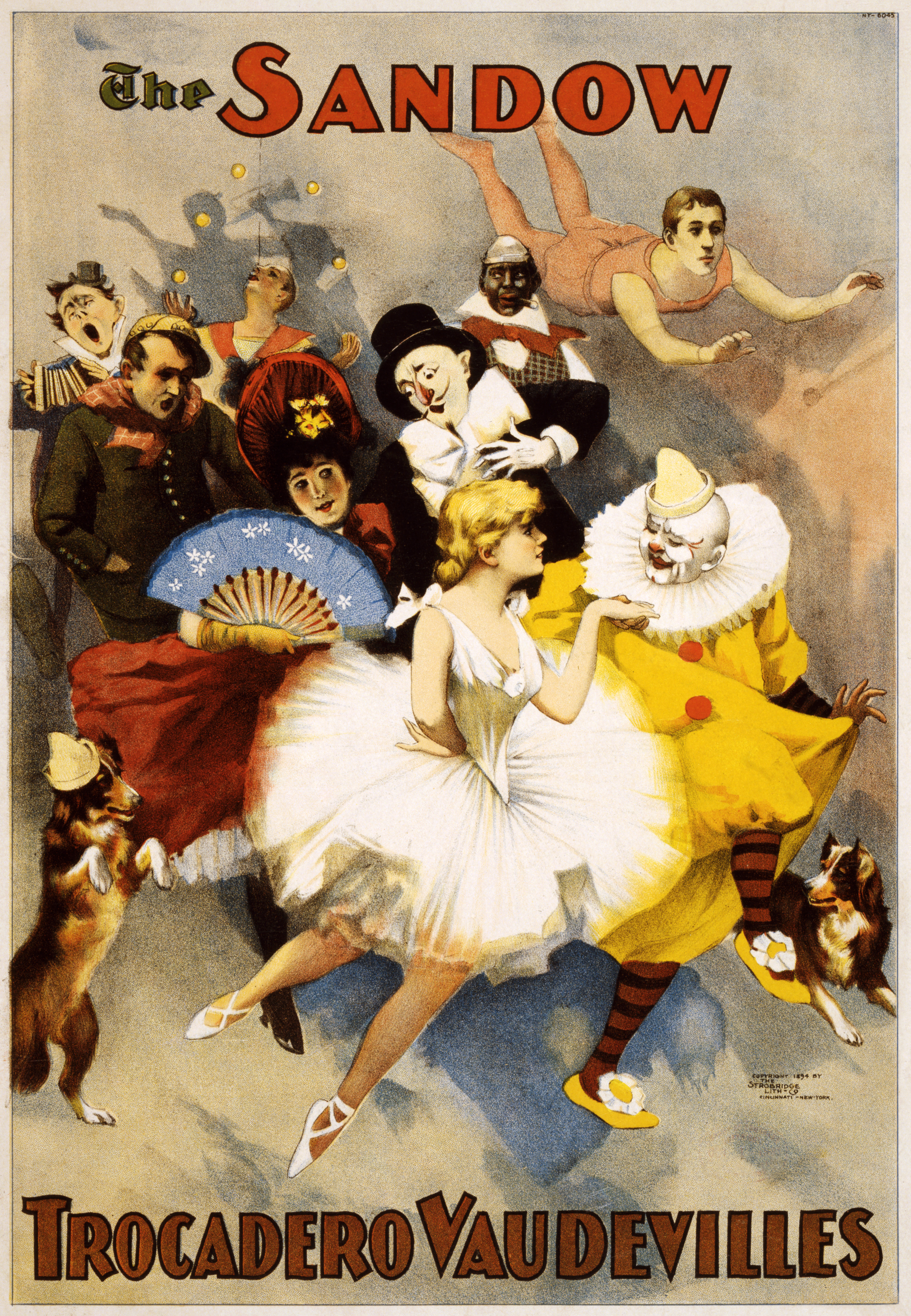
Poster for an 1894 vaudeville show featuring dancers, clowns, trapeze artists and dogs in costume

Variety show, also known as variety arts or variety entertainment, is entertainment made up of a variety of acts including musical performances, sketch comedy, magic, acrobatics, juggling, and ventriloquism. It is normally introduced by a master of ceremonies or host. The variety format made its way from the Victorian era stage in Britain and America to radio and then television. Variety shows were a staple of English language television from the late 1940s into the 1980s.

While the format is still widespread in some parts of the world, such as in the United Kingdom with the Royal Variety Performance, the Philippines with Eat Bulaga! and It's Showtime, and South Korea with Running Man, the proliferation of multichannel television and evolving viewer tastes have affected the popularity of variety shows in the United States. Despite this, their influence has still had a major effect on late night television whose late-night talk shows and NBC's variety series Saturday Night Live (which originally premiered in 1975) have remained popular fixtures of American television.

== History ==
=== Stage and radio ===
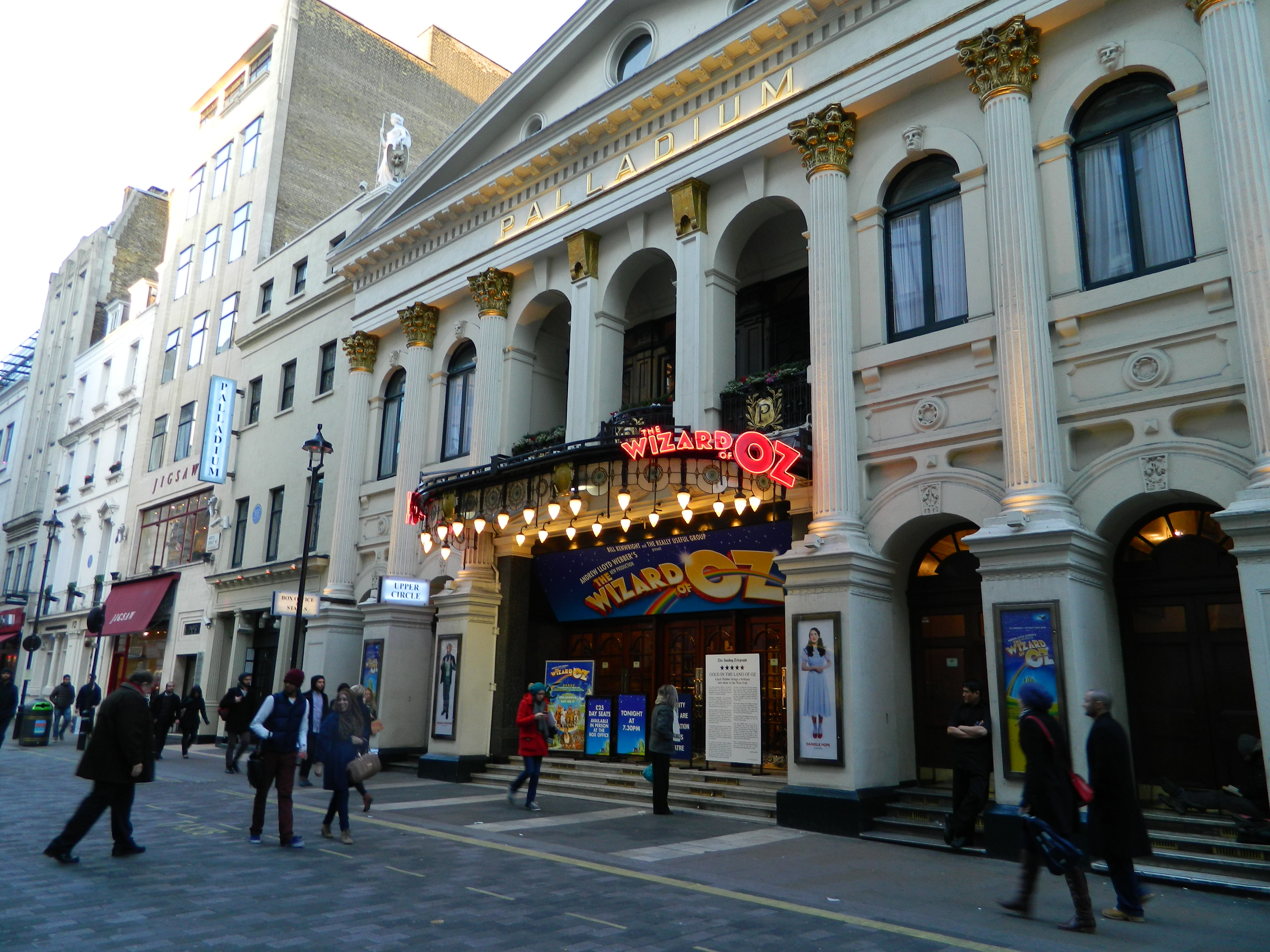
Begun 1912, the Royal Variety Performance was first held at the London Palladium (pictured) in 1941. Performed in front of members of the Royal Family, many famous acts have performed over the century.

The live entertainment style known as music hall in the United Kingdom and vaudeville in the United States can be considered a direct predecessor of the "variety show" format. Variety in the UK evolved in theatres and music halls, and later in working men's clubs. British performers who honed their skills in music hall sketches include Charlie Chaplin, Stan Laurel, George Formby, Gracie Fields, Dan Leno, Gertrude Lawrence, and Marie Lloyd. Most of the early top performers on British television and radio did an apprenticeship either in stage variety, or during World War II in Entertainments National Service Association (ENSA). In the UK, the ultimate accolade for a variety artist for decades was to be asked to do the annual Royal Command Performance at the London Palladium theatre, in front of the monarch. Later known as the Royal Variety Performance (from 1919), it continues today. In the 1940s, Stan Laurel revisited his music hall days when he performed at the Royal Variety show.

In the United States former vaudeville performers such as the Marx Brothers, George Burns and Gracie Allen, W. C. Fields, and Jack Benny honed their skills in the Borscht Belt before moving to talkies, to radio shows, and then to television shows, including variety shows. Radio variety shows were the predominant form of light entertainment during the Golden Age of Radio from the late 1920s through the 1940s; such radio shows typically included a house vocalist, music from the house band, a stand-up monologue and a short comedy sketch. Variety shows centered on running comedy sketches with recurring characters eventually evolved into sitcoms (situation comedies).

=== 1931–1960 ===
Variety shows were among the first programs to be featured on television during the experimental mechanical television era. Variety shows hosted by Helen Haynes and Harriet Lee are recorded in contemporary newspapers in 1931 and 1932; because of technical limits of the era, no recordings of either show have been preserved. After World War II, the genre again was an early favorite of the burgeoning electronic television industry; Hour Glass, dating to 1946, is the earliest surviving variety show, preserved in the form of audio recordings and still photographs. The genre proliferated during the Golden Age of Television, generally considered to be roughly 1948 to 1960. Many of these Golden Age variety shows were spin-offs or adaptations of previous radio variety shows.

From 1948 to 1971 The Ed Sullivan Show was one of CBS's most popular television series. Using his no-nonsense approach, host Ed Sullivan was instrumental in bringing many acts to prominence in the United States, including Elvis Presley and The Beatles. One year after Sullivan's premiere, Music & the Spoken Word first aired on television. Having carried over from an already 20-year run on radio, the series airs a program of religious music, messages, and occasional interviews, and remains the longest-running variety show in U.S. television history. "The Arthur Murray Party" (1950–1960) was wildly popular and one of only 5 shows in the history of television to appear on all four major networks at the same time. The premise was a large dance party hosted by Kathryn Murray and Arthur Murray that showcased a new dance and a celebrity guest along with dozens of professional dancers. The show also hosted the only television appearance of Buddy Holly and The Crickets. The Lawrence Welk Show (1955–1982) would go on to become one of U.S. television's longest-running variety shows; based on the concept of the big band remote from the old-time radio era, it was already one of the last shows of its kind when it debuted and far outlasted all other big-band centered broadcast series by the end of its run.

Other long-running American variety shows that premiered during this time include Texaco Star Theatre (1948–1956), Jerry Lester's Cavalcade of Stars, Broadway Open House and Chesterfield Sound-Off Time (1949–1952); The Jackie Gleason Show (1950–1955), The Garry Moore Show (1950–1967, in various incarnations), The Morey Amsterdam Show (1950–1954 in various incarnations), The Colgate Comedy Hour (1950–1955), Your Show of Shows (1950–1954), The Red Skelton Show (1951–1971), The Dinah Shore Show (1951–1957), The George Gobel Show (1954–1960) and The Dinah Shore Chevy Show (1956–1963). Perry Como also hosted a series of variety shows that collectively ran from 1948 to 1969, followed by variety specials that ran until 1994.

Shorter-lived variety shows during this period include The Frank Sinatra Show (1950–1952), The Jimmy Durante Show (1954–1956) and a different The Frank Sinatra Show (1957–1958).

In the UK The Good Old Days—which ran from 1953 to 1983—featured modern artists performing dressed in late Victorian/Early Edwardian costume, either doing their own act or performing as a music hall artist of that period. The audience was also encouraged to dress in period costume in a similar fashion. Other long-running British variety shows that originated in the 1950s include Tonight at the London Palladium (1955–1969), The Black and White Minstrel Show (1958–1978), The White Heather Club (1958–1968) and Royal Variety Performance (an annual event televised since the 1950s).

=== 1960s ===
Popular American variety shows that began in the 60s include a revival of The Jackie Gleason Show (1960–1970), The Mike Douglas Show (1961-1981), The Andy Williams Show (1962–1971), The Danny Kaye Show (1963–1967), The Jimmy Dean Show (1963-1975), The Hollywood Palace (1964–1970), The Dean Martin Show (1965–1974), The Carol Burnett Show (1967–1978), The Smothers Brothers Comedy Hour (1967–1969) and Rowan & Martin's Laugh-In (1968–73). 1969 saw a flurry of new variety shows with rural appeal: The Johnny Cash Show (1969–1971), The Jim Nabors Hour (1969–1971), The Glen Campbell Goodtime Hour (1969–1972) and Hee Haw (1969–1992).

Entertainers with less successful variety shows in the 1960s include Judy Garland and Sammy Davis Jr.

=== 1970s ===
Some consider disco to be the boiled-down essence of Seventies pop culture. But that doesn't quite cover it. Not everyone liked disco. In fact, a bunch of head-banging, beer-crushing rock jocks blew up a pile of disco records in the Chicago White Sox outfield.

If any art form truly encapsulates the entirety of '70s culture, it is the variety show. After all, the variety show was not an art form, it was all art forms. A variety show packed sketch comedy, dance choreography, guest celebrities and concert performances (okay, lip-synching) into one anything-goes show. A variety show is Broadway meets Solid Gold meets Saturday Night Live meets Saturday morning.

— MeTV

In 1970 and 1971, the American TV networks, CBS especially, conducted the so-called "rural purge", in which shows that appealed to more rural and older audiences were canceled as part of a greater focus on appealing to wealthier demographics. Many variety shows, including long-running ones, were canceled as part of this "purge," with a few shows (such as Hee Haw and The Lawrence Welk Show) surviving and moving into first-run syndication. Variety shows continued to be produced in the 1970s, with most of them stripped down to only music and comedy.

The Carol Burnett Show remained successful. Other popular variety shows that ran in the 1970s include The Flip Wilson Show (1970–1974), The Sonny & Cher Comedy Hour (1971–1977, in various incarnations), The Bobby Goldsboro Show (1973–1975), The Hudson Brothers' Razzle Dazzle Show (1974–1975), The Midnight Special (1973–1981), Don Kirshner's Rock Concert (1973–1981), The Mac Davis Show (1974–1976), Tony Orlando and Dawn (1974–1976), Saturday Night Live (1975–present), Donny & Marie (1976–1979), The Muppet Show (1976–1981), and Sha Na Na (1977–1981). Of all of these, only Saturday Night Live remains on the air today, and has become the second-longest-running variety show in the history of American television.

Entertainers with weekly variety shows that ran for one season or less in the 1970s include Captain & Tennille, The Jacksons, The Keane Brothers, Bobby Darin, Mary Tyler Moore, Julie Andrews, Dolly Parton, Shields and Yarnell, The Manhattan Transfer, Starland Vocal Band, and the cast of The Brady Bunch.

Entertainers with variety-based TV specials in the 70s include Carpenters, John Denver, Shirley MacLaine, Diana Ross, Bob Hope, and Pat Boone. Paul Lynde hosted a string of irregularly scheduled Comedy Hours through the late 1970s.

By the late 1970s nearly every TV variety show had ended production. Audiences were clearly tiring of the format; the highest-rated variety show of 1975, Cher, was only the 22nd-most watched show of the year.

=== 1980s–present ===
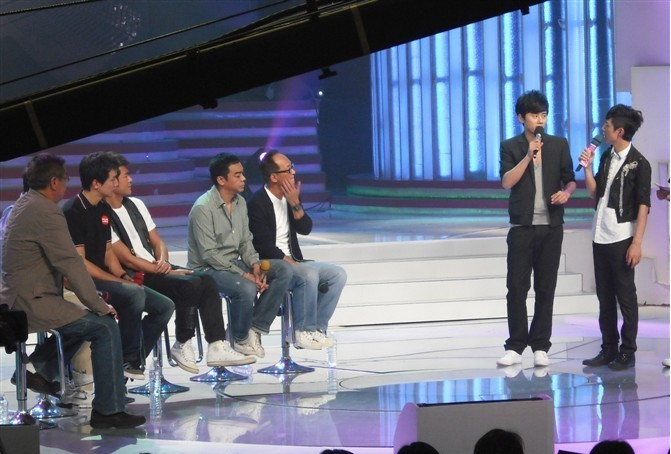
Singers perform on the Chinese variety TV show Happy Camp.

By 1980 viewer interest in TV variety shows was rapidly waning. Most of the few new variety programs being produced were of remarkably poor quality (for instance, the infamous Pink Lady and Jeff), hastening the format's demise, though a few moderately successful shows remained, such as Barbara Mandrell & the Mandrell Sisters (November 1980 to June 1982). A brief revival of the genre arose in the late 1980s and early 1990s. Variety shows from this era included Dolly (starring Dolly Parton), which ran for 23 episodes on ABC during the 1987–88 season; The Tracey Ullman Show which aired on Fox from April 1987 through May 1990; a revival of The Smothers Brothers Comedy Hour from 1988 to 1989; a revival of The Carol Burnett Show, which was broadcast by CBS for nine episodes in 1991 (following up on Carol & Company on NBC the previous year); and Showtime's The Super Dave Osborne Show hosted by Bob Einstein from 1987 to 1991 (itself a spinoff of John Byner's Bizarre, which ran from 1980 to 1986). By the 1990s, networks had given up on the format; after initially promising Phil Hartman his own variety show, NBC backed out of the agreement believing a variety show could no longer succeed.

By the 21st century the variety show format was practically extinct, due largely to changing tastes and the fracturing of media audiences (caused by the proliferation of cable and satellite television) that makes a multiple-genre variety show impractical. Even reruns of variety shows have generally not been especially widespread; TV Land briefly broadcast repeats of some variety shows (namely The Ed Sullivan Show and The Sonny & Cher Comedy Hour) upon its launch in 1996, but within a few years, reruns of most of those shows (except The Flip Wilson Show) were discontinued. Similarly, CMT held the rights to Hee Haw but broadcast very few episodes, opting mainly to hold the rights to allow them to create performance videos from the episodes to be shown in its video blocks. The current rights holder of Hee Haw, RFD-TV, has been more consistent broadcasting complete episodes of the program; RFD-TV also airs numerous other country-style variety shows from the 1960s and 1970s up through the present day, in a rarity for modern television. Another notable exception is The Lawrence Welk Show, which has been frequently broadcast in reruns on the Public Broadcasting Service (PBS) since 1986. The Danny Kaye Show returned to television in 2017 with reruns on Jewish Life Television (and, in the case of a one-off Christmas special, the Christian-leaning network INSP); JLTV dropped Kaye from its schedule at the end of 2018. The Carol Burnett Show, which had aired in severely edited form sporadically in syndication since it ended in 1977, returned intact in 2019 on numerous platforms. Digital multicast network getTV shows variety shows on an irregular basis. The Spanish language variety show Sabado Gigante, which began in 1962, and then moved from Chile to the United States in 1986, continued to produce and broadcast new episodes on Univision until its cancellation in September 2015.

At least one national variety show continued on national radio into the 21st century. A Prairie Home Companion was founded and created by Garrison Keillor in 1974 as an homage to rural radio variety shows, featuring sketch comedy based on radio dramas of the old-time radio era, complete with faux commercials. (For a brief time in the late 1980s, the show was replaced with The American Radio Company of the Air, also hosted and created by Keillor, was set in a more urban environment and likewise was based on old-time radio; its short run eventually morphed into a revival of A Prairie Home Companion). In 2016, following Keillor's retirement, Chris Thile took over the program and, over the course of the next year, transformed it into Live from Here, a more streamlined musical variety series. Live from Here, which moved to New York City in 2019, was cancelled due to budget cuts in 2020.

Improvisational comic Wayne Brady, coming off his successful appearances on the panel game Whose Line Is It Anyway?, launched an eponymous variety show in 2001, which aired on ABC. The Wayne Brady Show lasted only one summer season in its variety format; when the show returned the next year in syndication, it had been reformatted as a talk show, under which format it ran until 2004.

Fox's Osbournes Reloaded, a variety show featuring the family of rocker Ozzy Osbourne, was canceled after only one episode had been telecast in 2009. More than two dozen affiliates refused to telecast the first episode of the show. This series had been slated for a six-episode run.

NBC has made repeated attempts at reviving the variety format since the late 2000s (the network's last successful variety series, Michael Nesmith's short-lived but influential Television Parts, was broadcast in the summer of 1985) . A pilot episode for Rosie Live was telecast the day before Thanksgiving Day in 2008 and, after receiving middling ratings and extremely poor reviews, was not picked up for its originally planned run in January 2009. In May 2014, NBC aired The Maya Rudolph Show, a variety show starring SNL performer Maya Rudolph. Like Rosie Live, the broadcast was intended to be a one-off special, but with the possibility of additional episodes depending on its performance. The special won its time slot, due mainly to a strong lead-in, and spawned the May 2016 premiere of Maya & Marty, adding fellow SNL cast member Martin Short; under that format, Maya & Marty lasted six episodes. Earlier that season, NBC aired Best Time Ever, an adaptation of the British variety game show Ant & Dec's Saturday Night Takeaway starring actor Neil Patrick Harris which was ultimately unsuccessful.

== Related formats ==
=== Christmas and other variety specials ===
Starting in the 1950s, some entertainers became associated with variety television specials that would recur on a regular basis, in some cases for decades, on American network TV. Such entertainers included Bob Hope, Bing Crosby, Perry Como, Andy Williams and Mitzi Gaynor. Many of these were Christmas variety specials, which often showed the star in a set meant to look like their home, welcoming singers and other guests to perform duets of Christmas songs. The popularity of these Christmas shows outlasted that of weekly variety shows. In 1973, for example, even as variety shows were starting to fade in popularity, variety Christmas specials hosted by Williams and Como both attracted an enormous 40% of the American television audience. Williams's and Johnny Cash's annual Christmas specials outlasted the regularly scheduled variety shows that spawned them by several years. Christmas variety specials' popularity continued into the 1990s, before starting to wane in the 2000s. Nevertheless, the tradition has continued. Entertainers who have hosted Christmas variety specials in the 21st century include Kid Rock, Nick Lachey and Jessica Simpson, Carrie Underwood, Lady Gaga, Michael Buble, Bill Murray, Gwen Stefani, and Darci Lynne.

=== Talk shows ===
Though the format faded in popularity in prime time, it thrived in American late-night TV. Night-time variety shows eventually evolved into late-night talk shows, which combine variety entertainment (primarily comedy and live music) with the aspects of a talk show (such as interviews with celebrities). The Emmy Awards academy considers the two genres to be related closely enough that, until 2015, the Primetime Emmy Award for Outstanding Variety, Music or Comedy Series was open to any of these types of show; in 2015, the academy separated late-night talk shows and sketch comedy series into separate categories.

During Johnny Carson's tenure on The Tonight Show on NBC from 1962 to 1992, the show dominated late night ratings, and the other networks attempted late-night talk shows only sporadically. This changed with Carson's retirement, and other networks began to air their own talk show competitors, starting with Late Show with David Letterman on CBS in 1993. As of the current generation of American hosts, late-night talk shows vary widely on their resemblance to the original variety format, with Jimmy Fallon's incarnation of The Tonight Show putting heavy emphasis on sketch and game segments incorporating celebrity guests (especially involving music). The Late Show with Stephen Colbert placed a larger emphasis on news satire, similar to its host's previous Comedy Central late-night program The Colbert Report (where Colbert portrayed himself as a parody of rightwing pundits).

The Richard Bey Show combined the variety show with the tabloid talk show, not only having its guests talk about their problems but also having them participate in absurdist games, and Sally Jesse Raphael was known for occasionally having music and fashion in the show, especially drag and gender-bending performances.

=== Sketch comedy shows ===
American sketch comedy series such as Saturday Night Live, In Living Color, Almost Live! (and its successor Up Late NW), MADtv, and SCTV also contain variety show elements, particularly musical performances and comedy sketches. The most obvious difference between shows such as Saturday Night Live and traditional variety shows is the lack of a single lead host (or hosts) and a large ensemble cast. SNL has used different guest hosts ever since its inception.

=== Talent shows ===
Televised talent shows have a variety show element, in that they feature a variety of different acts. Examples of US talent shows that feature entertainers from a broad variety of disciplines include Star Search, which had a run in the 1980s in syndication and a run on CBS in the early 2000s during the reality television boom; The Gong Show, which reached its peak in the 1970s but has had occasional revivals since then; and the worldwide Got Talent franchise.

=== Telethons ===
The variety show format also continued in America in the form of the telethon, which feature variety entertainment (often music) interspersed with appeals for viewers to make donations to support a charity or cause. The Jerry Lewis MDA Telethon was one of the best-known telethons in the United States, but it too was eventually canceled after several years of shortening (originally over 21 hours, by the time of its last telecast in 2014, by which point Lewis had been gone from the telethon several years, it was down to two hours). Another popular telethon, for United Cerebral Palsy, ended its run in 1998 shortly after the death of its founder and figurehead, Dennis James. Likewise, only a handful of long-established local telethons remain.

== Other countries or regions ==
=== Australia ===
The prime time variety show format was popular in the early decades of Australian television, spawning such series as In Melbourne Tonight, The Graham Kennedy Show, The Don Lane Show, and Hey Hey It's Saturday, which ran for 27 years. Recent prime time variety shows include the short lived Micallef Tonight and The Sideshow.

=== Brazil ===
In Brazil variety shows are referred to as a show de auditório (lit. 'auditorium show'). Among the longest-running variety shows on Brazilian television have been SBT's Programa Silvio Santos (1963–present), which was originally hosted by SBT's owner and founder Silvio Santos (and is presently hosted by his daughter Patricia Abravanel), and TV Globo's Domingão do Faustão (1989–2021), which was hosted by Fausto Silva until he departed the network to host a short-lived variety show on Rede Bandeirantes.

=== Chile ===
The Spanish-language variety show known as Sábados Gigantes (forerunner of the U.S. Sábado Gigante) began in 1962 with Don Francisco and lasted into the 1990s. His daughter, Vivianne Kreutzberger, currently hosts the program under the title Gigantes con Vivi, while Don Francisco has hosted the U.S. version since 12 April 1986 until the end of the show's run on 19 September 2015.

=== Czechoslovakia ===
From 1971 to 1998, Czechoslovak Television, then Czech TV ran the variety show of music and comedy sketches, Televarieté. Vladimir Dvořák planned the program as a show with an international lineup. Since there was a limited number of domestic stars available, some episodes dedicated the second half to a single composer—usually of international hits—rather than a single performer.

Dvořák and Jiřina Bohdalová (beginning in 1977) would welcome the audience and, after a brief conversation, introduce the first act. Around ten performers (dancers, singers, magicians, variety artists, etc.) would then take the stage, with most acts interspersed by linking commentary or comedy sketches—all penned by Dvořák. Musical accompaniment was provided by the Czechoslovak Television Orchestra, typically conducted by Václav Zahradník or Mirko Krebs. While performers and dancers from the Eastern Bloc predominated, guests from countries such as West Germany, France, and Italy also frequently appeared.

=== France ===
Throughout the 1960s and the 1970s, the producers Maritie and Gilbert Carpentier created the most popular variety shows on French television, including Le Sacha Show (1963–1971) hosted by Sacha Distel, Top à... (1972–1974), Numéro Un (1975–1982) and a lot of television specials presented by various famous singers (Johnny Hallyday, Sylvie Vartan, Claude François, Petula Clark).

From 1965 to 1970 was also aired Dim Dam Dom, a modern, playful and sophisticated show intended for a female audience and produced by Elle chief editor Daisy de Galard. Each episode of Dim Dam Dom was hosted in an all-white studio set by a different speakerine (a female continuity announcer), usually a popular actress or singer like Françoise Hardy, Marie Laforêt, Geraldine Chaplin, France Gall, Jane Birkin, Françoise Fabian, Romy Schneider.

=== Hong Kong ===
The first Cantonese variety show to become a major success was Hong Kong's Enjoy Yourself Tonight, which first aired in 1967 and ran for 27 years. In Hong Kong, variety shows are often combined with elements of a cooking show or a talent competition but end in various results.

=== Japan ===
Variety programming has remained one of the dominant genres of television programming. While Japanese variety shows are famous abroad for their wild stunts, they vary from talk shows to music shows, from tabloid news shows to skit comedy. The prominent use of telop on screen has created a style that has influenced variety programming across Asia. One of the most popular variety shows in Japan includes Downtown no Gaki no Tsukai.

=== Mexico ===
Siempre en Domingo premiered in 1969 with Raúl Velasco hosting. It became Mexico's longest-running variety series, remaining on Televisa until 1998. Other long-running variety shows, most of which have been Televisa productions, have included La Carabina de Ambrosio, Anabel, Al Fin de Semana, Silvia y Enrique, La Parodia, Muevete, Desmadruga2, and Sabadazo.. Most, if not all, of Televisa's variety shows have aired in other countries, including the Univision networks in the United States.

=== Philippines ===
In the Philippines, a genre of daytime variety show—often referred to as "noontime shows"—have been popular across its major television networks; these shows typically air on either weekday or weekend afternoons, and feature a mix of comedy routines and sketches, performances, game show segments, and talent searches. Some noontime shows also feature public service elements, usually via segments featuring remote broadcasts from different barangays.

Student Canteen—which began on radio and moved to television in 1958 on the Chronicle Broadcasting Network (CBN)—has traditionally been considered the earliest entry in the genre. In 1979, RPN premiered Eat Bulaga!, which would eclipse it in popularity, and later go on to become the longest-running variety show on Filipino television. Amid the sequestration of RPN by the Presidential Commission on Good Government (PCGG) following the People Power Revolution, Eat Bulaga! moved to ABS-CBN in 1989. In 1994, after its producers resisted demands by ABS-CBN to purchase the rights to Eat Bulaga! outright, the show made a high-profile move to GMA Network (where Student Canteen successor Lunch Date had been neck-and-neck with it in viewership).

In the mid-2000s, ABS-CBN's Wowowee would become another prominent competitor to Eat Bulaga. The series would face multiple controversies over its run: in 2006, a crowd crush before its first anniversary special at the PhilSports Stadium killed 73 people and injured 400 others. In 2007, a technical error during its jackpot game segment resulted in allegations that it had been rigged, as well as a public conflict between Eat Bulaga co-host Joey de Leon and Wowowee host Willie Revillame.

In 2023, Eat Bulaga! was embroiled in a conflict between its producers TAPE Inc. and original hosts Tito Sotto, Vic Sotto, and Joey de Leon, over the direction of the show. The disputes culminated with a lawsuit by the hosts over the rights to their contributions, including the Eat Bulaga! title itself. The trio established a new production company known as TVJ Productions with the backing of rival network TV5, and premiered E.A.T... in July 2023. The program was billed as a spiritual continuation of Eat Bulaga! and featured many of its former cast members. E.A.T... ran in parallel with Eat Bulaga on GMA Network, which had continued on with a new cast. In January 2024, the Marikina Regional Trial Court ruled in favour of TVJ, thus allowing them to reacquire the rights to the Eat Bulaga! name and prohibiting its use by TAPE. E.A.T... was subsequently retitled Eat... Bulaga!, while TAPE's version of the show was renamed Tahanang Pinakamasaya; after low viewership, Tahanang Pinakamasaya was cancelled in March 2024 and replaced by its ABS-CBN-produced competitor It's Showtime (which had been displaced to other outlets since 2020 after its terrestrial broadcast licenses were revoked).

=== South Korea ===
In South Korea, the popular show Infinite Challenge, has been broadcast by MBC from 2005 to 2018, was a new model of this, called "Real Variety Show". It combined comedy and variety scenes including unscripted stunts and special guest stars while taking place in various settings. Although many variety shows have existed in Korea long before the broadcast of Infinite Challenge, this program has given a rise to a new page in the history of Korean variety shows by introducing unscripted stunts. As a result, other broadcasting channels such as KBS and SBS have followed its path and introduced programs such as 2 Days & 1 Night and Running Man. These types of Korean variety shows are grabbing foreign interest of countries such as Japan, China, Thailand, Indonesia, Malaysia, Singapore, and even the US and Philippines bringing on a new type of the Korean wave globally.

=== Soviet Union ===
The variety show tradition in Soviet television established itself as a cornerstone of cultural life, with iconic shows that entertained millions and reflected societal values. Little Blue Light (Goluboy Ogonyok), which debuted in 1962, became a New Year's Eve tradition, blending music, comedy sketches, and celebrity interviews in a convivial atmosphere that connected audiences with popular Soviet stars. Around the same time, Wider Circle (Shire Krug) expanded the format to emphasize cultural diversity, featuring folk performances, community events, and discussions of national achievements to promote unity. Adding satire to the mix, Pub "13 Chairs" (Kabachok "13 Stulyev"), aired from 1966 to 1980, and entertained viewers with its fictional Polish café setting, where characters performed comedic sketches and musical numbers inspired by Eastern Bloc satire magazines, offering subtle commentary on contemporary life. Meanwhile, Pesnya Goda (Song of the Year), launched in 1971, became an annual celebration of the year's top songs and performers, evolving into a prestigious platform that mirrored shifts in Russian music and society.

=== Taiwan ===
Two notable Taiwanese variety shows are Guess (1996–2012) and 100% Entertainment (1997–present). East Asian variety programs are known for their constant use of sound effects, on-screen visuals and comedic bantering. Many of the shows are presented in a live-like presentation in a fast-paced setting, with scenes repeating or fast forwarded.

Another popular variety show in Taiwan was Kangsi Coming (2004–2016). It was famous for its bantering, which was scripted.

=== United Kingdom ===
Variety shows with an emphasis on comedy sketches were popular in the United Kingdom from the late 1960s until the 1980s. Two of the longest-running and most popular series were Morecambe and Wise and The Two Ronnies.

=== Venezuela ===
In Venezuela, the best known variety show is Súper Sábado Sensacional. Originally established in 1968 (as Sábado Espectacular) on Radio Caracas Television, the show moved to Venevision in 1970 and was renamed Sábado Sensacional. In 1990, "Súper" was added to the title, and is how the show is currently known today.

== See also ==
- List of British music hall musicians, which features a list of Variety performers
- Variety Artists Club of New Zealand, a club for variety performers and entertainers
- Variety, the Children's Charity, widely known as the Variety Club, a charity operated by variety performers
- Japanese variety show
- Korean variety show
- Cine-variety, a mix of variety acts performing in between the showing of films
