= George Beauchamp (music hall) =

English music hall singer and comedian (1862-1900)

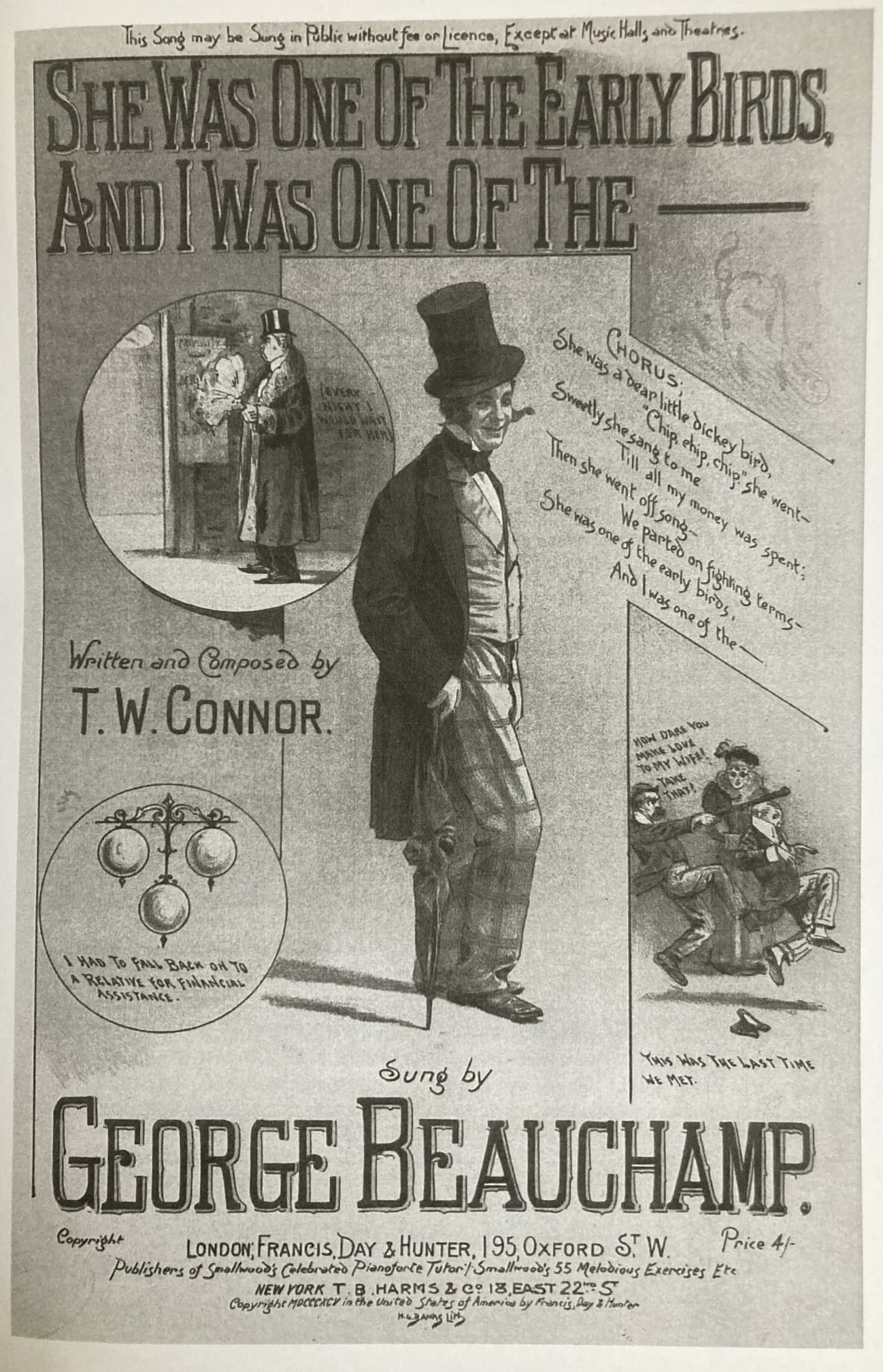
Sheet music cover for "She Was One of the Early Birds" (1895) showing Beauchamp

Sarsfield Patrick Beauchamp (20 February 1862 – 28 December 1900), known professionally as George Beauchamp, was an English music hall singer and comedian.

He was born in Southwark, London, the son of a policeman, and in early life worked at a printing company, eventually becoming a compositor. By 1879, he joined a theatre company specialising in melodramas and Shakespeare, and in 1882 promoted himself as an "eccentric vocal character comedian". He appeared in shows and pantomimes in the north of England, and then in London, and made several visits to perform in the United States as well as one to Australia in 1898.

In the biography of Charles Morton, "The Father of the Music Halls", Beauchamp was described as "very eccentric but otherwise estimable..... [a] really droll comic-singer, who had the funniest of faces..". His most successful songs included "Get Your Hair Cut" (written by Beauchamp with Charles Osborne and Fred Eplett, 1891), "She Was One of the Early Birds" (written by T. W. Connor, 1895), and "Has Anybody Seen Our Cat?" (also by Connor, 1899). The song "She Was One of the Early Birds" was his biggest success, described in The Era in 1895 as "the rage of London".

E.V. Lucas, who saw him perform in Oxford, described him as,

… a confidential and apparently half-witted droll, with an enormously wide mouth and a foolish smile, who had he succeeded in resisting the temptations besetting such a career, would have been a great success in London … coarse though he was, or perhaps because he was, … My mind is full of snatches of his songs … There was one about discovering after marriage that his wife had a wooden leg, the kind of brutal fun we English like.

‘She’s not the slightest use to me,

She’s half a woman and half a tree.’

He married fellow performer Nellie Lingard in 1889, but she died of tuberculosis in late 1899, aged 31. Beauchamp continued to perform, but died in hospital in Liverpool while on tour the following year, aged 38. His death was from pneumonia, possibly the result of "a somewhat dissipated lifestyle".
