= Robert Glindon =

Francis Robert Glindoni (c. 1799 – 23 February 1866) was a British singer, songwriter, and scene painter.

He was born in Dublin, and worked in London as a scene painter. He contributed to "London by Night", a diorama which was exhibited at the opening of the London Colosseum in Regent's Park in 1829, and later worked on another diorama, "Earthquake at Lisbon". By night, Glindon sang comic songs in such venues as the Coal Hole in the Strand, the Cyder Cellars in Covent Garden, the Dr. Johnson Concert Room near Fleet Street, the Eagle tavern in Shoreditch, and the Vauxhall Gardens.

Glindoni performed songs by other writers such as Thomas Hudson, but also wrote his own material, including "The Literary Dustman", first published in 1832. Several of his songs, including "Biddy the Basket Woman" and "Yankee Wonders", mocking Americans for their propensity for exaggeration, were published in a collection in 1845. In their 1895 book The Variety Stage, authors Charles Douglas Stuart and A. J. Park describe Glindon as "a talented author and composer" and "one of the foremost buffo singers" of his time.

In later years, after his singing voice deteriorated, Glindoni worked in the scenery department at Drury Lane Theatre, only performing small parts in pantomimes. He died in London in 1866, aged 67, and was buried at Kensal Green Cemetery.

Glindoni was married twice, first in 1820 to Mary Ann Adams who died in 1827, and then to Sarah Harris in 1829. One of his grandchildren used the name Henry Gillard Glindoni, and became a respected and fashionable artist.
