= E. W. Mackney =

English entertainer (1835–1909

- Born: Edmund William Mackney; 11 February 1825; London, England, U.K.
- Died: 26 March 1909 (aged 84) Enfield, Middlesex, England, U.K.
- Genres: Music hall
- Occupations: Singer, instrumentalist, dancer
- Years active: 1834 – c. 1890s

Edmund William Mackney (11 February 1825 – 26 March 1909) was an English blackface entertainer in early music halls, described as "The Great Mackney" and "The Negro Delineator".

== Biography ==
Born in London into a theatrical family, he made his first appearance in pantomime in 1834 before becoming established in music halls in London. He was one of the first to perform in blackface in Britain, and modelled his performances on the routines of the American Thomas D. "Daddy" Rice. He toured music halls around the country, as a singer, musician and dancer, usually performing as a solo entertainer but occasionally in a double act with Joseph A. Cave. He also worked for a time as an innkeeper in Birmingham.

When appearing at Evans's Supper Rooms in Covent Garden, he was seen by impresario Charles Morton, who booked him for the Canterbury Music Hall and billed him as "The Great Mackney" despite Mackney's own misgivings. He soon rose to become one of the great stars of the early music hall.

His dancing was so good that he was invited to judge champion dancing competitions, and he was regarded as a fine musician, playing piano, banjo, violin – on which he played impressions of animal noises – guitar, and bones. His impressions of "negro life" ranged from refined and sympathetic portrayals to parody.

His best-known song was "The Whole Hog or None", a song originally written by George Ware, to which topical verses were regularly added.

Several books of "negro songs" were published in Mackney's name, including Mackney's One Hundred Negro Songs (1847) and Mackney's Songs of Negro Life, As Sung by Him... (1860). In 1863, one of the first banjo-instruction books was published in his name, Mackney's Sixpenny Banjo Tutor.

Mackney continued to perform in London and elsewhere in the country, and also toured in Europe. He retired from the stage in early middle age, and settled in Enfield, Middlesex, where he became a respected grower of roses. He then returned to the stage for several years, for financial reasons, and repeated his previous success.

In 1897, he published an autobiography, The Life and Reminiscences of E.W. Mackney, Ethiopian Entertainer.

He died in 1909, aged 84.
