= Jack Selbini =

American-born British trick cyclist, acrobat and entertainer

- Born: Patrick Joseph McCoy c. 1854; Westfield, Massachusetts, U.S.
- Died: 5 November 1932 (aged 77–78); Thornton Heath, Surrey, England
- Occupations: Trick cyclist, acrobat, entertainer
- Years active: c.1870–1909

John Selbini (born Patrick Joseph McCoy, c.1854 – 5 November 1932), was an American-born British trick cyclist, acrobat and entertainer, who established The Selbinis, one of the most successful family acts performing in British music halls and internationally between the 1880s and the First World War.

== Biography ==
=== Early years ===
Patrick McCoy was born in Westfield, Massachusetts, U.S., the son of Irish immigrants. He moved with his parents and family back to England as a child, and grew up in Hanley, Staffordshire. From about 1864, he travelled with a circus, and learned horse riding and circus tricks, but soon ran away to join another small troupe of cyclists and acrobats led by George Gorin, later known as George Letine. McCoy initially worked as an acrobat and contortionist in the troupe, touring in both Britain and continental Europe, and took on the stage name of Jack (or John) Selbini. From around 1875 he became the troupe's star attraction as a trick cyclist.

He then formed a double act with another trick cyclist, William Villion (born William Stephen Bexfield, 1853–1913). They were described as "the only artists that throw backward and forward somersaults on velocipedes." In late 1876 they performed together for eight weeks at the Theatre Royal in Covent Garden, where they appeared before the Prince and Princess of Wales. After Selbini recovered from a serious injury after a fall, the Selbini-Villion troupe toured widely in 1877, including in Germany where he met singer and dancer Lily Knight (1860–1930); they married in 1878, and had five children between then and 1886. The troupe was very successful, and both Lily and Villion's wife Lizzie joined the act. They toured widely over the next three years, often as part of Hengler's Circus, appeared at the Folies Bergere, and before the King and Queen of Spain in 1880. The following year they undertook a lengthy tour of North America with Forepaugh's Circus, before Selbini and Villion decided to end their partnership, for unknown reasons.

=== Family troupe ===
After returning to England, Selbini and his wife started a family troupe, enrolling their eldest daughter, Lalla (born Mary Elizabeth McCoy, 1878–1942). In 1883, they started a two-year tour of North America with Michael B. Leavitt's company. The family of three, with another man known as Alpha, returned to England and added another daughter, Leola (then aged 3) to their act in 1885. They achieved star status on theatre bills, and returned to the U.S. in 1887 for another tour. Lily remained in the U.S. for some months as a solo performer, but the family reunited in England the following year.

In 1889, when in Paris, Selbini heard of Letine's murder and returned to London to perform at a benefit for his widow. This resulted in successive long contracts and tours, performing around Britain. By 1893 the family toured constantly giving shows in Britain and in Europe, and had grown into a troupe of eight - Jack, Lily, their three daughters, one son, and two other men. The act developed to include combinations of trick cycling, acrobatics, juggling, comedy and music. Selbini set up a gymnasium for training, took out patents for apparatus, and was involved in the Grand Order of Water Rats as well as setting up cycling clubs.

In 1897, the family troupe toured Australia, again as the leading attraction on a bill produced by Harry Rickards. Lily Selbini retired after the tour. One reviewer on the Australia tour described part of the act:

The family has played several seasons through America, and has a world-wide reputation. The girls play violins on the bicycles while performing their tricks, and Selbini carries at one time every member of the troupe, who play mandolins the while, and circles the stage on a big bicycle made specially for the purpose. Then two of the male members of the company ride abreast, carrying a horizontal bar on their shoulders. And as they ride round the stage the two younger girls perform gymnastic tricks on Roman rings attached to the bar.

=== Later activities ===
Jack's eldest daughter Lalla Selbini, who had become the star performer in the family, left the troupe in 1902, in order to marry and establish herself as a solo performer. She became a successful and risqué vaudeville entertainer, who was briefly arrested on indecency charges in 1906. She was a close friend of the magician and illusionist Sigmund Neuberger, known as "The Great Lafayette". After he died in a theatre fire in 1911, she inherited the rights to his show, and his remaining props, and continued to perform some of his illusions and stunts in A Carnival of Conjuring. She later worked as a solo act, billed as "The Bathing Belle on the Bicycle", and described as "one of the prettiest figures on the stage."

Jack Selbini retired from performing in about 1909, but continued to manage the troupe, which included his younger children and others. Lily Selbini died in 1930, and Jack Selbini died in Thornton Heath, Surrey, in 1932 at the age of 78. Lalla Selbini died in Bangor, Michigan, U.S., in 1942 at the age of 64.
