= May Henderson =

May Henderson (13 November 1884–28 September 1937) was an English music hall singer, dancer, and blackface comedienne, billed as "The Dusky Queen".

She was born in Bury, Lancashire, the daughter of Britton Henderson, a comedian and clog dancer who was a member of the Henderson and Stanley Quartette. Her parents toured as music hall performers, and May first appeared on stage as a solo performer in Newcastle in 1897. By 1900, she became a popular performer in blackface, unusual for a woman at the time. She appeared in shows and pantomimes in London and around the country, with songs such as "I Love a White Man".

James Agate said of her: "Her wit is not near the knuckle. It is the knuckle itself.... Her joking may be occasionally concerned with foul things, but it is never indecent... In addition to its humour, the performance of this artist is of the highest technical excellence...". Another reviewer described her as "unrivalled" as a "coon impersonator". She also performed "My Sweetheart is the Double-Bass Viol", in which she "indulges in amorous gestures to members of the orchestra who is playing the instrument to which she refers". One obituary said of her that, "with her step-dancing and quick wits, she only just missed becoming a top-liner".

She married fellow performer Bert Jee in 1907; they had two children. She continued to perform throughout the First World War, and visited wounded soldiers. She was engaged as a blackface entertainer for some years afterwards, before retiring in 1932. With her husband, she managed pubs at Walton-on-Thames and at Birchington near Margate in Kent.

She died in Camberwell, London, in 1937, aged 52.
