= Bessie Wentworth =

English entertainer

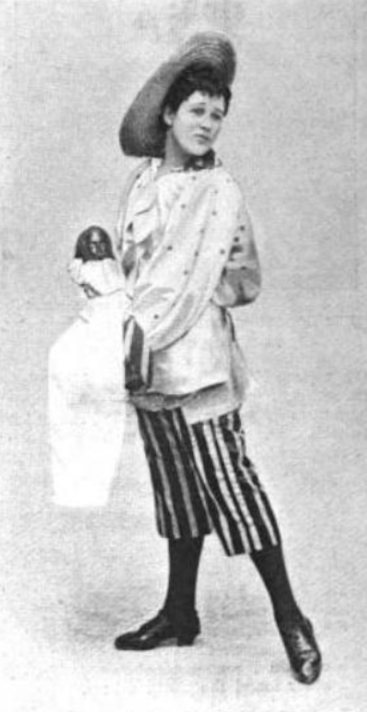
- In The Sketch, 23 January 1895
- Born: Elizabeth Mary Andrews; 20 March 1873; Lambeth, London, England
- Died: 6 January 1901 (aged 27); Lambeth, London, England
- Occupation(s): Singer, comedian

Bessie Wentworth (born Elizabeth Mary Andrews, 20 March 1873 – 6 January 1901) was an English music hall singer and comic entertainer.

== Biography ==
She was born in Lambeth, London, where her mother ran a boarding house for theatrical performers. After leaving school, she worked as a clerk before joining Jack Sheppard's troupe in 1891. She became a principal boy in pantomimes, and a singer of boy roles in operettas, before developing a solo act in music halls. Although she did not use blackface, she sang plantation songs and coon songs, dressed as a young man wearing a stereotypical costume of open-necked shirt, striped pantaloons, and a large straw hat. One of her most successful songs was "Looking for a Coon Like Me", written by George Le Brunn with lyrics by John Harrington.

She was very successful in the 1890s, and a popular subject of photographs and postcards of her in masculine poses. She was portrayed in the costume of a plantation worker in a lithograph by Toulouse-Lautrec, probably from a visit he made to London in 1896. Her last appearance, at the top of the bill, was in December 1900.

Known as a keen cyclist, she was planning to marry and run a public house with her husband, but died aged 27, in Lambeth, from typhoid fever.
