= J. W. Rickaby =

English entertainer (1870–1929)

- Born: James Emanuel Platt; 1870; Weymouth, Dorset, England, U,K,
- Died: 1 October 1929 (aged 59); London, England, U.K.
- Occupations: Comic entertainer, singer
- Years active: 1890s–1920s

J. W. Rickaby (born James Emanuel Platt; 1870 – 1 October 1929) was an English music hall comedian.

== Biography ==
He was born in Weymouth, Dorset, the son of a colour sergeant in the 7th Royal Lancashire Militia, and grew up in Manchester. He married Martha Ann Waite in 1894.

Rickaby began as a serious actor and baritone singer, but discovered he could make a better living as a comic entertainer and first appeared as such in music halls in 1904. He performed in a shabby frock coat, battered top hat, old boots and spats.

He toured Australia in 1908. One review said of him: "He is a comedian with a good deal of genuine humor, which he exhibited in amusing burlesques of various types of character, such as a British soldier with a capacity for enjoyment, a sailor, and a policeman. These were hit off in such a manner as to keep the audience laughing heartily during his turns."

His songs included "What Ho, She Bumps!", "PC 49", and "Silk Hat Tony", which became better known as "They Built Piccadilly for Me". He recorded several of his songs. He was offered the song "Burlington Bertie" but turned it down as being too similar to his other material.

His song "Major General Worthington", composed by Ted Waite (writer of "I've Never Seen a Straight Banana"), extolled the virtues of Worthington ale. It was covered by Barry Dransfield on his self-titled 1972 album.

Rickaby died in London in 1929, and was buried at Putney Vale Cemetery.
