= Thomas Hudson (songwriter) =

English writer (1791-1844)

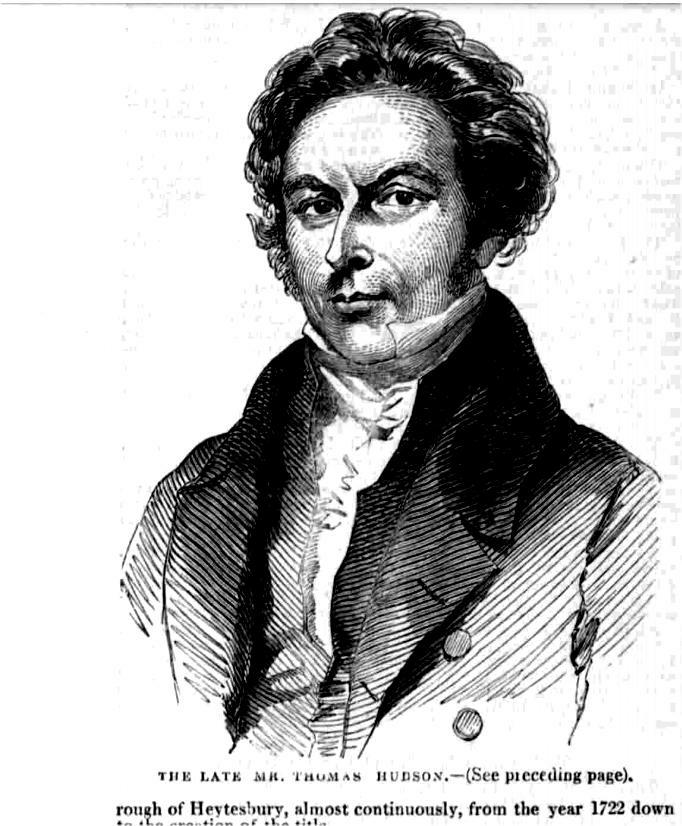
- Born: April 1791; Lambeth, London, England
- Died: June 1844 (aged 53); London, England
- Occupation(s): Music hall entertainer and songwriter
- Years active: 1810s–1844

Thomas Hudson (April 1791 – June 1844) was an English writer and performer of comic songs who was one of the earliest credited songwriters in the music hall tradition.

== Biography ==
Tom Hudson was born in Mount Street, Lambeth, in 1791, the son of John Hudson who worked at the Stamp Office in Somerset House. He set up in business as a grocer, but by about 1818 had begun writing and performing his own songs in private parties and for the proprietors of Vauxhall Gardens. A prolific comic singer and songwriter, he published collections of his songs every year between 1818 and 1831. He performed regularly in "song and supper rooms" such as the Cyder Cellars in Maiden Lane, Covent Garden, which opened in the mid-1820s and had a very broad clientele ranging from tradesmen and apprentices to members of parliament; and the Coal Hole, near the Strand.

His most popular songs included "I Never Says Nothing to Nobody" (1825), "Barney Brallaghan's Courtship" (c.1830), and "The Spider and the Fly" (1830). Walter Thornbury described Hudson as "the writer of half the comic songs that once amused festive London". He was considered to be "a man of considerable literary ability", and his songs were described as "lively and really witty". The music hall historian Harold Scott said of Hudson's songs that they contain "a reliance on the commonplace and intimate occurrences of everyday life. A different class angle is visible; in Hudson the lower middle class became articulate."

The Illustrated London News said of him:

Though well known in the convivial circles of the metropolis, Hudson was not a dissipated man, for his habits were the reverse of intemperance: his talents impromptu were very great; he has often caught some incident which occurred at the table, or availed himself of the unexpected appearance of some public character, to produce appropriate joke or compliment, which never failed to tell upon the company.... [He] was by no means an Apollo in voice; but the new song, composed by the singer, excused his defects or vocal execution. His more studied efforts were characterised by great humor and knowledge of life, and an abundant stock of those grotesque images which give the finish to a comic picture.

Hudson died "in straitened circumstances" in 1844, aged 53, leaving a wife and children. He was buried at Kensal Green Cemetery on 29 June 1844. A benefit concert was arranged at the Princess' Theatre to raise funds for his family, under the patronage of the Duke of Cambridge, the Lord Mayor, T. S. Duncombe M.P., and others.
