= Sam Collins (music hall) =

Collins c. 1860

Sam Collins (born Samuel Thomas Collins Vagg; 22 March 1825 – 25 May 1865) was an English music hall comedian, singer and theatre proprietor.

He was born in Marylebone, London, and started work as a chimney sweep. He began touring the music halls in London in the 1840s, in the guise of an Irish traveller, characteristically "wearing a brimless top hat, a dress coat, knee breeches, worsted stockings, and brogues... his clothes tied up in a bundle and a shillelagh on his shoulder." His songs, such as "Paddy's Wedding", "Limerick Races", and "The Rocky Road to Dublin", earned him the nickname "The Singing Irishman", and "he is still regarded as the prototype stage Irish comic".

In 1855, he bought the Rose of Normandy tavern, and turned it into the Marylebone Music Hall, accommodating over 800 patrons. He sold it in 1861, and bought the Lansdowne Arms in Islington, converting it into a larger venue, which became known as Collins's Music Hall after it opened in 1863. Collins died in 1865, but his widow continued to run the music hall after his death. It was enlarged in 1897 and remained as a theatre until it was destroyed by fire in 1958.
