= Evans Music-and-Supper Rooms =

Coordinates: 51°30′43″N 0°07′26″W

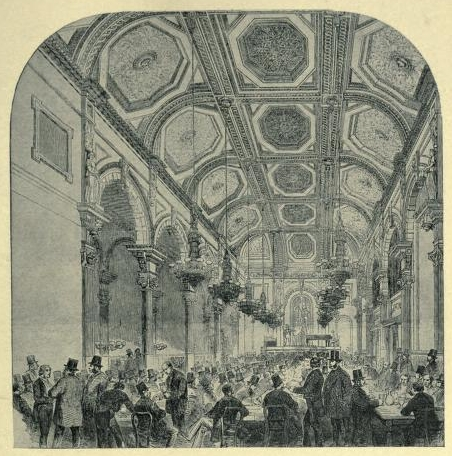
Illustration of Evans Music-and-Supper Rooms from Fifty years of a Londoner's life (1916)

Evans Music-and-Supper Rooms was an entertainment venue for music and singing in the early nineteenth century, located at 43 King Street, Covent Garden, London. The venue provided the type of entertainment which later evolved into music hall. What would later be known as the Evans Music and Supper Rooms was initially known as the Thomas Archer House. The house was built by Thomas Archer in 1712 for Admiral Edward Russell, the fourth Earl of Bedford's grandson. The House would later be sold to a man named Joy and turned into The Grand Hotel. Formerly the dining room of the Grand Hotel, a 'song and supper' room was established in the 1840s by W. H. Evans. It was also known as Evans Late Joy's, the venue previously being owned by a man named Joy. In 1842 the rooms were taken over by John Paddy Green, who had been one of Evans's entertainers. Green reconstructed the rooms and maintained their popular reputation. The room was 113 feet (34.4 m) long by 56 feet (17.1 m) wide.

Evans' existed as the most popular song and supper room in the West End for some time during the late 1800s Entertainment was provided by choir boys singing madrigals and glees, followed by older comic singers such as Sam Cowell, Charles Sloman and Sam Collins. The patrons would eat, drink and talk at tables provided and participate in singalongs, sometimes of a "lewd" nature. A repeat performer there in the late 1870s was the comedian Arthur Roberts, who was known for his risqué act. In 1879, his performance of one of his "saucy" songs caused Evans's to lose its license for a year. The venue was patronised by William Makepeace Thackeray, who presented it (in a composite portrait with the Coal Hole and the Cyder Cellars, two nearby song-and-supper rooms) as "The Cave of Harmony" in his novel The Newcomes and as "The Back Kitchen" in Pendennis.

Unlike the later music halls the patrons were male only, until the 1860s, when women were at last admitted. John Paddy Green said in an interview that women were not allowed in because they were uneducated.

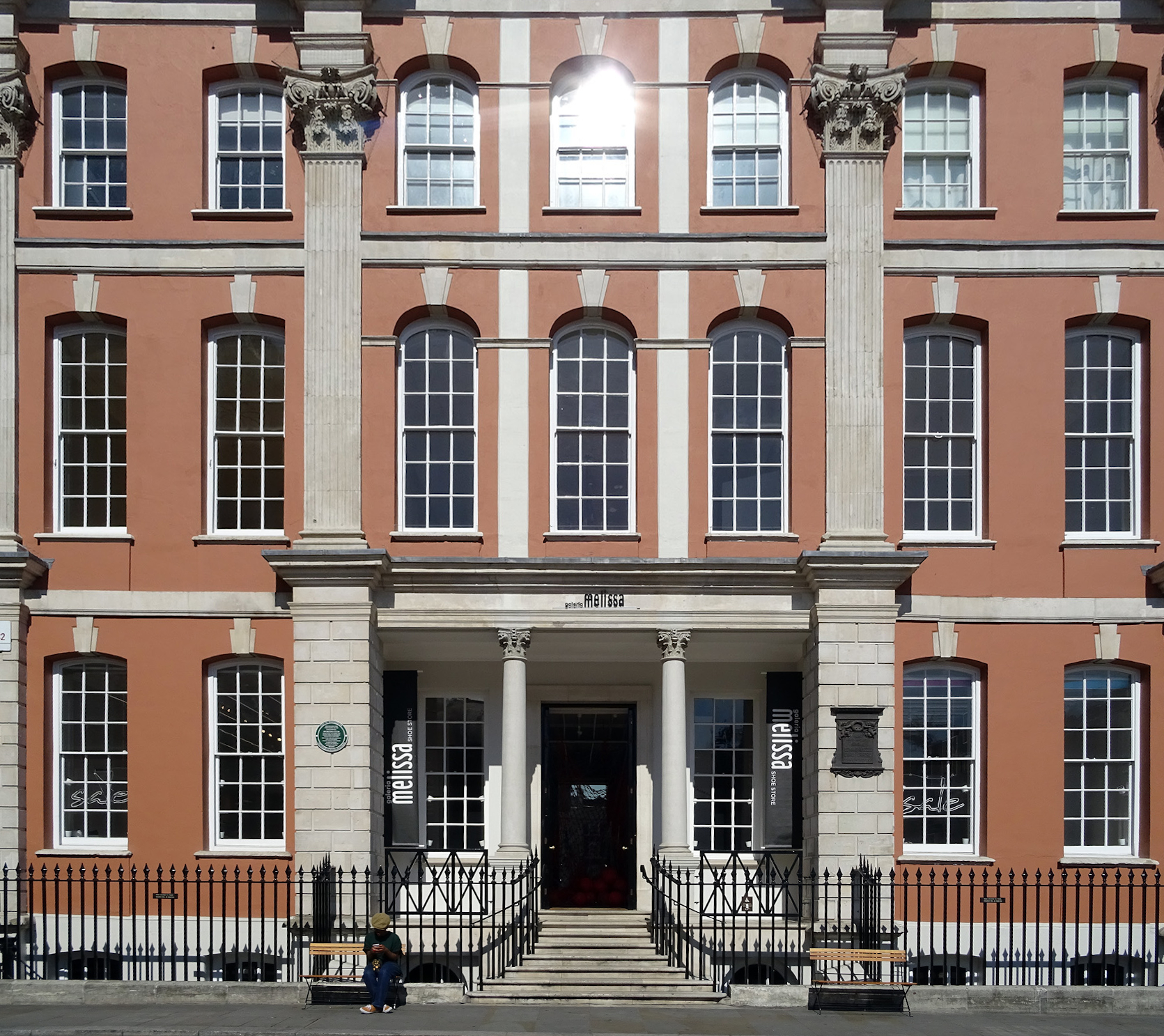
43 King Street

The venue closed in 1880, and in 1930 the upstairs rooms in the building were occupied by the Players' Theatre Club who wished to revive the music hall tradition. The cast became known as the "Late Joys" and have since provided old time music hall entertainment at a variety of other venues.

== See also ==
- List of supper clubs

== Sources ==
- Baker, Richard, Anthony (2005). British Music Hall: An Illustrated History. London: Sutton Publishing Ltd. ISBN 0-7509-3685-1.
