= List of former theatres in London =

This is a partial list of former theatres in London.

== Former theatres in London ==
=== English Renaissance theatres ===
This covers the period from the establishment of the first Tudor playhouses, through to their closure by Parliament at the beginning of the English Civil War in 1642.

=== Post Renaissance former London theatres ===
- Alhambra Theatre
- Astoria Theatre
- Bolton's Theatre Club
- Britannia Theatre
- The Bunker, Southwark
- Camden Theatre
- Cockpit Theatre
- Coronet Theatre
- Daly's Theatre
- Dorset Garden Theatre
- Empire Theatre of Varieties
- Empress Theatre (Brixton)
- Everyman Theatre, Hampstead
- Folly Theatre later Toole's Theatre
- Gaiety Theatre, London
- Garrick Theatre (Leman St)
- Gate Theatre Studio
- Gibbon's Tennis Court
- Globe Theatre (Newcastle Street)
- Golders Green Hippodrome
- Goodman's Fields Theatre
- Half Moon Theatre
- Hippodrome, London
- Holborn Theatre
- Lisle's Tennis Court
- London Opera House
- London Pavilion
- Novelty Theatre
- Olympic Theatre
- Open Space Theatre
- Opera Comique
- Original Shaftesbury Theatre
- Q Theatre
- Queen's Theatre, Long Acre
- Players' Theatre
- Princess's Theatre, London
- Royal Aquarium
- Royal Strand Theatre
- Royalty Theatre
- Rutland House
- Sans Souci Theatre
- Saville Theatre
- Scala Theatre
- St George's Hall
- St James's Theatre
- Stoll Theatre
- Surrey Theatre
- Terry's Theatre
- Theatre Royal, Marylebone
- Turbine Theatre
- Unity Theatre
- Westminster Theatre
- Windmill Theatre

== Former music halls ==
- Apollo Saloon
- Canterbury Music Hall
- Charing Cross Music Hall
- Evans Music-and-Supper Rooms
- Golders Green Hippodrome
- London Hippodrome
- London Pavilion
- Middlesex Music Hall, the Old Mo'
- Oxford Music Hall
- Strand Musick Hall
- Surrey Theatre
- Weston's Music Hall (later, the Holborn Empire)
- Wilton's Music Hall

== See also ==
- List of London venues
