= The OK Thing to Do on Sunday Afternoon Is to Toddle in the Zoo =

the ok thing to do on sunday afternoon is to toddle in the zoo

Studio album by My Little Airport
- Released: 2004
- Recorded: Unknown
- Genre: Indie pop
- Label: Harbour Records; HRCD002

My Little Airport chronology
| the ok thing to do on sunday afternoon is to toddle in the zoo (2004) | becoz i was too nervous at that time (2005) |

The OK Thing to Do on Sunday Afternoon Is to Toddle in the Zoo (在動物園散步才是正經事) is the debut album by the Hong Kong-based indie pop band My Little Airport in 2004. The title song is adapted from an 1871 Victorian street ballad and music hall monologue "Walking in the Zoo" by The Great Vance. The album was written and produced by the duo P (林阿P) and Nichole (區健瑩), who make up My Little Airport. The music magazine MCB describes it as an album with "Fresh and dreamy electronic music, featuring sometimes smooth and sometimes interesting piano sounds, and a sweet and sincere female lead singer". The album uses a lot of sounds from toy Casio keyboards, creating a whimsical and playful sound reminiscent of childhood.

== Songs ==
Most of the songs in the album start with a name, and are songs to long lost friends. The lyrics are direct and often narrate everyday experiences. They reflect on the nostalgic past, in order to cherish the present.

The song "Josephine's Shop" recalls the times of Nicole and P when they practiced guitar at their friend's music store after college classes.

== Critical reception ==
Despite its homemade origins, it has garnered attention from multiple media outlets.

Commercial Radio 903 writes "After suddenly entering the mainstream music scene, it successfully entered the top ten albums on Commercial Radio's pop chart."(translated from Cantonese).

Local magazines have also featured the album. Pi Magazine writes "Using people and things around them as the theme, each song seems to be a poetic confession.". While Milk Magazine writes "At this moment, It reminded me of Shunji Iwai's movies, of 'Hana and Alice'". EastTouch described it as "reminiscent of the fresh music of Kings Of Convenience, Belle and Sebastian.". (Note: Translated from Cantonese)

== Track listing ==
1. "coka, i'm fine"
2. "the ok thing to do on sunday afternoon is to toddle in the zoo" (在動物園散步才是正經事)
3. "victor, fly me to stafford"
4. "edward, had you ever thought that the end of the world would come on 20.9.01"
5. "audrey, about scenery" (柯德莉，關於風景)
6. "my little banana "
7. "josephine's shop"
8. "faye wong, about your eyebrows" (王菲，關於你的眉)
9. "you don't wanna be my girlfriend, phoebe "
10. "dee, it may all end tomorrow "
