= Oxford Music Hall =

Former London music hall turned retail space

- Facade of the Oxford Music Hall, 1918 postcard
- Interactive map of Oxford Music Hall
- Address: Oxford Street; Westminster, London
- Coordinates: 51.516°N 0.131°W
- Owner: Charles Morton
- Type: Music hall

Construction
- Opened: 26 March 1861
- Demolished: 1926
- Rebuilt: 1869 Finch Hill {with Paraire} 1873 Edward Paraire; 1893 Wylson and Long
- Years active: 1861-1926
- Architects: Finch Hill, with Edward Lewis Paraire

Oxford Music Hall was a music hall located in Westminster, London, at the corner of Oxford Street and Tottenham Court Road. It was established on the site of a former public house, the Boar and Castle, by Charles Morton, in 1861. In 1917 the music hall was converted into a legitimate theatre, and in 1921 it was renamed the New Oxford Theatre. In May 1926 it closed and was demolished.

The site was occupied by the first Virgin Megastore from 1979, which closed in 2009. In September 2012, a branch of the budget fashion retailer Primark opened on the site.

== Early history ==
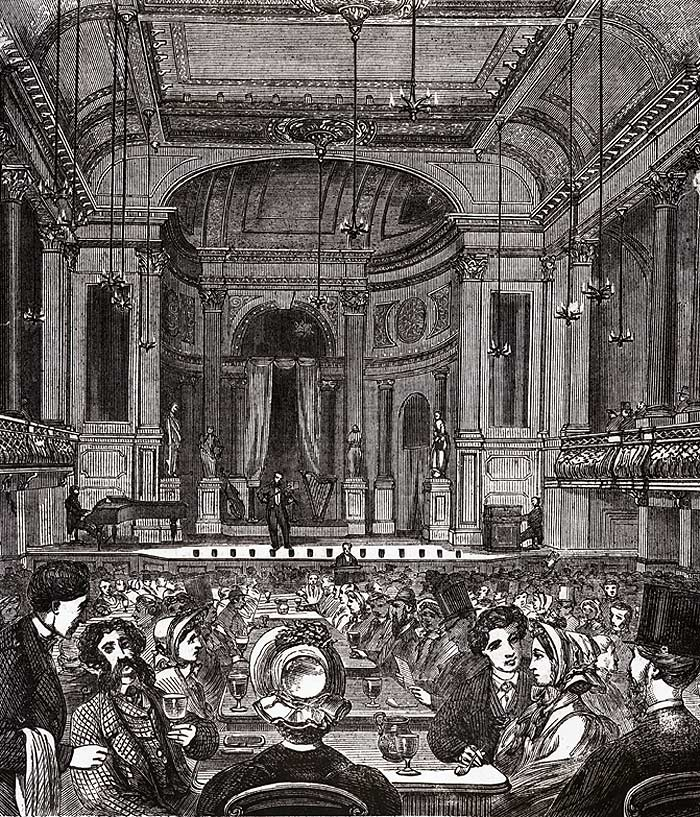
The 'apse' stage of the Oxford, ca. 1875. Patrons ate and drank in the auditorium

After the success of the Canterbury Music Hall many music halls imitating the formula opened in London. The Oxford Music Hall was designed by Messrs Finch Hill and Edward Paraire. The architecturally ambitious hall included deep balconies on three sides and a wide stage in front of an apse. It opened on 26 March 1861 as Morton's competitor to the nearby Weston's Music Hall despite Henry Weston's appeal to the magistrates that there were already too many music halls in the area. The singers Charles Santley and Euphrosyne Parepa-Rosa performed at the opening.

The hall quickly became one of London's most popular music halls. The Times commented in April 1861 that, like its rivals, the hall was "more or less thronged. 'The Oxford Music Hall', in Oxford-street, is the latest development on a grand scale of a species of entertainment now in great favour with the public." The hall was run by Morton and his brother-in-law, Frederick Stanley, who continued to run the Canterbury, with acts moving between the two halls in coaches. Many notable performers of the day appeared at the Oxford Music Hall, including Marie Lloyd, Marie Loftus, George Robey and Arthur Roberts, and the hall was famous for its lively barmaids. The barrister Arthur Munby visited the hall in March 1862 and found that:

The great gay glaring hall & balconies were crammed in every part; there was barely standing room in the crowd, which was chiefly made up of men; business men, clerks, & others, of no very refined aspect. … Socially speaking, the audience were a good deal higher than those I have seen in similar Halls at Islington & elsewhere. One result of this was, that the women present were whores, instead of respectable wives & sweethearts. Therefore another result was, that there was nothing wholesome or genial in the folks' enjoyment: they drank their grog staring gloomily or lewdly grimacing; and the worthless dread of your neighbour which halfeducated respectability creates kept them silent and selfish.

The hall burned down on 11 February 1868 and again on 1 November 1872; each time it was rebuilt by the same firm of architects; and over the years the hall was enlarged. By 1873, a square proscenium replaced the apse, and benches replaced the supper tables – with a broad promenade running where the rear balcony boxes had been – reflecting changes in the way music halls were used. The Entr'acte commented in 1881: "As a structure, the Oxford is, in our humble opinion, the handsomest hall in London."

== Later years ==
In its early years, the hall offered a significant amount of classical music in its programmes. In 1879, Charles Dickens Jr. wrote that "the operatic selections which were at one time the distinguishing feature of the Oxford have of late years been discontinued", and the hall's programmes after that date evidence a move to popular musical forms. In 1891, the Oxford became a Syndicate Hall under the management of the company that also managed the Tivoli and London Pavilion. This period of the theatre was captured by Walter Sickert in a series of paintings in 1892. The theatre was rebuilt to a design by Wylson and Long, with a conventional stage, 1,040 seats including boxes, domed ceiling and opulently decorated interior, and reopened on 31 January 1893. In 1891, George Robey and in 1895, Harry Tate made their solo debuts on the stage.

In 1917, the hall was converted into a legitimate theatre, and the musical The Better 'Ole, by the well-known cartoonist Bruce Bairnsfather, enjoyed a run of 811 performances. In 1921, the building was renamed the New Oxford Theatre, and the Phoenix Society revived Ben Jonson's long forgotten Bartholomew Fair. Later that year, the theatre was renovated by Charles B. Cochran, who presented a mix of films and plays. A London production of the hit Broadway musical Little Nellie Kelly played at the theatre between July 1923 and February 1924. In 1926, the theatre closed and was demolished.

== Later uses of the site ==
A large Lyons Corner House restaurant was later built on the site of the old Oxford. From 1979, the much-modified building was occupied by the first Virgin Megastore, which was rebranded as Zavvi in 2007 and closed its stores in 2009. In September 2012 a branch of the budget clothing retailer Primark opened on the site.

For a 1944 film, Champagne Charlie, the stage and bar of the Oxford during the 1860s were recreated with the lion comique and 'top of the bill' Alfred Vance played by Stanley Holloway.
