= Paraire =

Paraire is a surname and given name. Notable people include:

Surname

- Edward Lewis Paraire (1826–1882), British theatre and music hall architect

Given name

- Paraire Karaka Paikea (1894–1943), New Zealand Māori politician
- Paraire Tomoana (died 1946), Māori political leader
- Tapihana Paraire Paikea (1920–1963), New Zealand politician
