= Luppino family =

Luppino family may refer to:

- Luppino crime family, an Italian-Canadian crime family
- Lupino family, a British theatre family
