= Bessie Bellwood =

British music hall entertainer

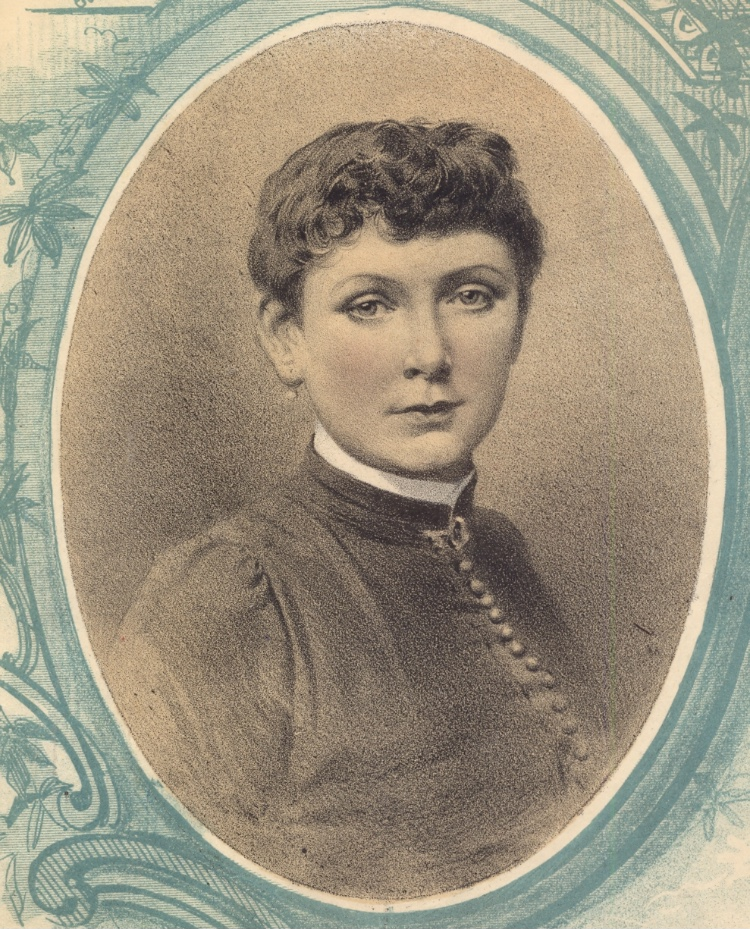
Bessie Bellwood- detail from a sheet music cover.

Bessie Bellwood (born Catherine Mahoney; 30 March 1856 – 24 September 1896) was a popular music hall performer of the Victorian era noted for her singing of 'Coster' songs, including "What Cheer 'Ria". Her onstage persona was that of an abrasive but loveable character with an ability to argue down even the toughest of hecklers.

Born in London, she made her music hall debut in Bermondsey. She became popular with cockney working-class audiences, and went on to appear on the same bill as Jenny Hill at the Canterbury Theatre of Varieties and the same bill as Vesta Tilley at Carlo Gatti's Charing Cross Music Hall. Off-stage, she became a popular figure in London for her many charitable donations to the poor. In later life Bellwood suffered from alcoholism as well as financial troubles and bankruptcy. With her health in decline, she died at her home in London, aged 40.

== Early life ==
Bellwood was born in London to Patrick Mahoney and his wife Catherine (née Ready), both of whom originated from County Cork in Ireland, and who had married in November 1849. The couple had four daughters: Mary, Ellen, Catherine and Ann Mahoney and a son, James Mahoney. As a teenager, she worked as a rabbit puller, or skin-dresser, in a local factory.

== Career ==
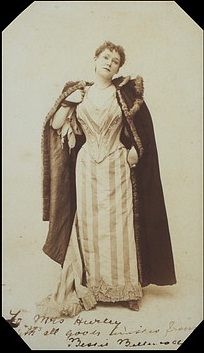
Bessie Bellwood

In 1876, aged 20, Catherine 'Kate' Mahoney assumed the stage name Bessie Bellwood and made her music hall debut at Bermondsey in London. She became a protegee of the songwriter J. W. Cherry. Songs in her repertoire included "He's Going To Marry Mary Ann", "E's Got A Wooden Leg and a Tall White 'at", "Woa Emma!", "What Cheer 'Ria?" and "Aubrey Plantagenet". On 25 March 1889, she appeared on the same bill as Jenny Hill at the Canterbury Theatre of Varieties and on August Bank Holiday in 1893 she stood in for Vesta Tilley at Carlo Gatti's Charing Cross Music Hall in London.

Although she lacked the versatility of her rivals Marie Lloyd and Jenny Hill, she nevertheless became a popular performer with working class audiences for her 'saucy' stage manner, quick witted comic talent, and her ability to argue down even the toughest of hecklers. An 1894 review wrote that "The singing is the smallest part of her performance. Her speciality is what is known in bucolic circles as 'sassin' back." Anecdotes include a five-minute dispute during her act with a 15-stone coal-heaver who then left the music hall where she was appearing and chastising another heckler by saying "I'll wipe the bloomin' 'all with him!"

Of her popular song What Cheer 'Ria?, author Peter Davison notes: "Bessie Bellwood was one of the first of the great women characters of the music halls; and she was the kind of woman who epitomised the spirit of the halls. She had a magnificent gift of repartee, she could dominate a lively audience, and with her courage and humour went a deep generosity that became a byword. This was not limited to giving money to those out of luck... "

Maurice Willson Disher (1893-1969), in his book Romance of the Music Hall, wrote of Bellwood:

Bessie Bellwood in some of her characters - The Sketch 30 September 1896.

"When Tony Pastor, the leading music hall manager of America, came over to arrange her visit to New York, she gave a great party there in his honour. In the midst of it, according to H. G. Hibbert’s account, Bessie Bellwood gave a shriek of delight when she heard a hawker crying winkles down the lane. "His stock on a japanned tea-tray slung round his neck was promptly commandeered. The shocked footmen, handing round tea, were despatched for pins, and the immortal singer of ‘Wot cheer, ‘Ria,’ whose real name was Mahoney, and who claimed to be a descendant of Father Prout,’ but who, most certainly, began life as a rabbit skinner in the New Cut, carefully divided her spoils among many applicants."

== Personal life ==
A devout Roman Catholic, she was admired by her public for her many acts of kindness to the poor, which included paying for Masses for the dead and dying, giving away her own money and possessions, taking in laundry, cleaning homes and looking after children. Despite being highly religious, Bessie's volatile and unpredictable nature was such that within four hours of having a devout conversation with Cardinal Manning about a Catholic charity she was shortly afterwards arrested in the Tottenham Court Road for knocking down a cabman she believed had insulted the man she loved. She also allegedly bit the ear of a boxing manager who she accused of slander.

On 24 September 1884 she married John Nicholson, a Commission Agent in the Register Office in Leeds. Little is known of Nicholson after the wedding, and he does not seem to have played a major part in his wife's life.

In 1890, Bellwood was briefly declared bankrupt as a result of lending a substantial amount of money to her long-time lover, the Duke of Manchester which was never repaid. Bellwood later sued the Duke unsuccessfully. She was also sentenced to 14 days in prison for failing to repay a debt.

== Death ==
Bellwood died of 'Cardiac Disease Exhaustion' on 24 September 1896, at her home at Dryden Mansions, Queen's Club Gardens, West Kensington, London, aged 40. Her early death was generally attributed to her alcohol-fueled Bohemian life-style. Her funeral cortege passed along Fulham Road and Whitechapel Road, and was witnessed by thousands of her fans, including her husband John Nicholson.

She was buried in St Patrick's Catholic Cemetery in Leytonstone. Bellwood died intestate; her estate, worth £125 (UK£14,378 in 2025 pounds), was given to Nicholson.

== Portrayals in film ==
In the 1944 film Champagne Charlie starring Tommy Trinder as George Leybourne and Stanley Holloway as Alfred Vance, the part of Bessie Bellwoood was played by Betty Warren.

In the 1975 film The Adventure of Sherlock Holmes' Smarter Brother she was used as an alias by the character played by Madeline Kahn (the film's title character immediately sees through the ruse, and states that Bellwood has been dead for over a decade by that time; in reality, Bellwood was still alive in the year the film was set, 1891).
