= Becoz I Was Too Nervous At That Time =

Studio album by My Little Airport
- Released: September 23, 2005
- Recorded: Unknown
- Genres: Indie pop Cantopop
- Length: 20:41
- Labels: Harbour; HRCD007

My Little Airport chronology
the ok thing to do on sunday afternoon is to toddle in the zoo (2004)	Becoz I Was Too Nervous At That Time (2005)	zoo is sad, people are cruel (2007)

Becoz I Was Too Nervous At That Time (只因當時太緊張) is the second studio album release by the Hong Kong-based indie pop band My Little Airport in 2005.

The fourth song of the album, Song of Depression (失落沮喪歌), was inspired by songwriter Ah P's reading of Osamu Dazai.

== Track listing ==
1. "Gigi Leung is dead" - 1:16
2. "I don't know how to download good av like iris does" - 2:26
3. "Because I Was Too Nervous at That Time" (只因當時太緊張) - 2:35
4. "Song of depression" (失落沮喪歌) - 2:26
5. "Take me as rucheng zhang" (就當我是張如城) - 1:48
6. "Pak Tin shopping center" (白田購物中心) - 1:10
7. "Leo, are you still jumping out of windows in expensive clothes?" - 2:09
8. "Your smile is like a flower" (你的微笑像朵花) - 2:37
9. "Spring is in carriage" (春天在車廂裡) - 2:39
10. "My little fish" - 2:17
