= Champagne Charlie (1944 film) =

1944 British film by Alberto Cavalcanti

- Original British quad format film poster
- Directed by: Alberto Cavalcanti
- Written by: John Dighton; Angus MacPhail; Austin Melford
- Produced by: Michael Balcon
- Starring: Stanley Holloway; Tommy Trinder; Betty Warren; Jean Kent
- Cinematography: Wilkie Cooper
- Edited by: Charles Hasse
- Music by: Ernest Irving
- Production company: Ealing Studios
- Distributed by: Ealing Distribution Ltd (UK)
- Release date: 25 August 1944 (UK)
- Running time: 105 minutes
- Country: United Kingdom
- Language: English

Champagne Charlie is a 1944 British musical film directed by Alberto Cavalcanti and loosely based on the rivalry between the popular music hall performers George Leybourne (born Joe Saunders), who was called "Champagne Charlie" because he was the first artist to perform the song of that title, and Alfred Vance, who was known as "The Great Vance".

Leybourne and Vance, portrayed by Tommy Trinder and Stanley Holloway, were London's big music hall stars of the 1860s and 1870s, of the kind called lions comiques. In the film, they are "top of the bill" at their respective music halls. The film's female leads are a music hall owner and her daughter, portrayed by Betty Warren and Jean Kent.

Champagne Charlie opens with a sing-along in a pub, and follows the rise of Leybourne as a music hall singer. The highlight of the film is a singing competition between the two protagonists. Leybourne sings "Ale Old Ale" and Vance replies with "Gin, Gin, Gin"; the competition continues, with the scene finally ending with the song of the title. The film is notable for its realistic approach to showing details of the audiences, venues and staff, with copious quantities of food and drink providing a vicarious delight for wartime audiences. In 1944, Champagne Charlie was typical of feature films designed to raise morale and generate goodwill.

== Plot ==
Joe Saunders and his brother Fred arrive in London from Leybourne in Kent, and go to the Elephant and Castle pub, the haunt of Tom Sayers, a leading boxer. While his brother, an aspiring boxer, is having a trial bout with Sayers, Joe Saunders is persuaded to sing a song to entertain the bar's customers. Initially reluctant, but persevering, his performance is a hit, leading to an offer from the landlord of a regular engagement at £1 a week and two free beers a night.

A month later, Saunders is a major hit at the bar, drawing large crowds. After receiving an invitation to sing at the local music hall, the Mogador, he unfortunately chooses to sing a slower, more melancholic song. Met with a mixture of indifference and hostility by the crowd, the Mogador's owner, Bessie Bellwood, calls the performance "horrible". Disappointed, he walks away and quietly begins to sing "Half and Half and Half" to himself, causing Bellwood to instantly change her opinion. Her job offer, however, has a catch: Saunders has to use a new name; he chooses George Leybourne, after his home town.

Soon, Leybourne establishes himself as a headlining fixture at the Mogador, performing to packed houses. When a member of the audience compares him unfavourably to "The Great Vance", whom Bellwood considers the greatest music hall performer of the era, she takes Leybourne to a performance Vance is giving; there he declares that he can be better than Vance. A new song is written for him, "Ale, Old Ale", quickly becoming a hit. An annoyed Vance, who considers drinking songs his territory, regards Leybourne as an upstart and responds with a new drinking song. A rivalry between them results in both developing fresh songs about different alcoholic beverages to outdo the other. Leybourne is eventually extremely successful with his signature hit: "Champagne Charlie".

An enraged Vance challenges him to a duel with pistols, fully expecting him to apologise. Leybourne, however, accepts the challenge, and a farcical duel takes place in which neither are hurt. Their rivalry continues, although music halls are under increasing threat from the government, which is being lobbied by theatre owners who see music halls as competitors to their business. Despite their rivalry, Vance and Leybourne begin to develop a grudging respect for each other and agree to stage a joint performance in support of the owner of one of the other music halls. A relationship also develops between Bessie Bellwood's daughter Dolly and Lord Petersfield, the young son of the duke in charge of the panel cracking down on the music halls.

Dolly resists Petersfield's repeated marriage proposals, believing that the gulf in class cannot be overcome, an impression especially fuelled by the polite but dismissive reception she receives from Petersfield's father, the Duke. Many years before, the Duke had nearly married Bessie Bellwood before being convinced by his father that she was beneath him. Bessie visits the Duke to persuade him to allow his son and her daughter to marry, reminding him of their own affair. She grows angry after discovering the Duke could ruin her because the committee he heads may close down the music halls.

During the first performance of Leybourne's latest song, a major riot is started by men paid by the theatre owners, who call upon the police to intervene. Fearing the closure of the Mogador and other music halls, performers and staff try to battle the rioters, sending out for help to the neighbouring music hall, where Vance is performing. Vance leads his own staff to the rescue. Overcoming the rioters and restoring order just before the police arrive, what is left is an orderly music hall audience listening to Leybourne's song.

Later summoned to give evidence before the committee, the performers give their evidence, expecting the worse. At the Mogador, Vance, Bellwood and Leybourne stage a joint performance. The Duke arrives, and on his announcement that the committee has decided in favour of the music halls, the entire audience erupts, drinking champagne to celebrate a secure future while singing "Champagne Charlie".

== Cast ==
- Tommy Trinder as Joe Saunders/George Leybourne
- Stanley Holloway as "The Great Vance"
- Betty Warren as Bessie Bellwood
- Jean Kent as Dolly Bellwood
- Austin Trevor as Duke
- Peter De Greef as Lord Petersfield
- Leslie Clarke as Fred Saunders
- Eddie Phillips as Tom Sayers
- Robert Wyndham as Duckworth, Mogador's Chairman
- Billy Shine as Mogador's stage manager
- Joan Carol as Mogador's barmaid
- Guy Middleton as Tipsy Swell
- Drusilla Wills as Bessie's dresser
- Frederick Piper as Learoyd
- Andreas Malandrinos as Gatti
- Paul Bonifas as Targetino
- Norman Pierce as landlord of Elephant & Castle
- Eric Boon as Clinker
- Harry Fowler as Horace
- Aubrey Mallalieu as Butler
- Kay Kendall (uncredited)

== Production ==
Champagne Charlie is set in the music halls of London in the 1860s and 1870s. The fictional Mogador (the name is borrowed from the Parisian music hall Théâtre Mogador) and the real Oxford Music Hall, at the corner of Oxford Street and Tottenham Court Road are featured.

Holloway based his performance as The Great Vance "largely on his memories" of George Lashwood (1863–1942), a popular English singer of the Edwardian era who performed in music halls throughout the country, especially in London's East End and at seaside locations such as Blackpool. Holloway had served in the First World War, but in 1939, too old for active service at 49, he made his contribution mainly in short propaganda pieces for the British Film Institute and Pathé News, narrating documentaries aimed at lifting morale in war-torn Britain. He continued to be very active as a performer during the Second World War, appearing on stage in revues and acting in films.

== Songs ==
Both Billy Mayerl and Lord Berners worked on the music for the film. Some of the featured songs include:

- "Arf of Arf and Arf"
- "The Girl Who Asked For More"
- "Don't Bring Shame on the Old Folks"
- "Ale, Old Ale"
- "Champagne Charlie"
- "Not in Front of Baby"
- "By and By"
- "Come on Algernon"

== Reception ==
Unusually for the time, Champagne Charlie premiered simultaneously at two cinemas in London on Friday, 25 August 1944: the London Pavilion and the Regal Cinema, Marble Arch. The reviewer for The Times called it "the gayest film that London has seen for some time." Most other reviews were favourable as well. The News Chronicle critic wrote that "To have any sort of musical, let alone British, maintaining a spontaneous running gaiety and an irresistible tunefulness is a new and blissful experience."

In the 1990s, film historian and critic Leonard Maltin wrote in Leonard Maltin's Movie Guide: "Splendid evocation of British music halls of the 1860s and their robust entertainers simply hasn't got enough story to last 107m. The songs are still great fun. Look for young Kay Kendall." In a 2012 review, Andy Webb, writing for The Movie Scene, observed: "... Champagne Charlie is an entertaining movie but only because of the performances from Tommy Trinder and Stanley Holloway as they deliver the various musical performances. If you watched it under the impression that you were going to have a look at the real Victorian era and a story based on two real musical performers you will end up disappointed."
