= Weston's Music Hall =

Music hall and theatre in London, England

- 1868 Royal Music Hall; Royal Holborn Empire; 1892 Royal Holborn Theatre of Varieties; 1906 Holborn Empire
- Interactive map of Weston's Music Hall
- Address: High Holborn; Camden, London
- Coordinates: 51.5174°N 0.1201°W
- Owner: Henry Weston
- Capacity: 2000 (1906)
- Type: Music hall
- Designation: Demolished 1960

Construction
- Opened: 16 November 1857
- Closed: 12 May 1941
- Rebuilt: 1886-1890 Lander and Bedells; 1906 Frank Matcham
- Years active: 1857 - 1941
- Architects: Finch Hill and Edward Lewis Paraire

Weston's Music Hall was a music hall and theatre that opened on 16 November 1857 at 242-245 High Holborn in London, England. In 1906, the theatre became known as the Holborn Empire.

== History ==
=== Early years ===
The theatre was constructed on the site of the Six Cans and Punch Bowl Tavern. Edward Weston, nephew of the previous licensee of the pub, bought the former Holborn National Schoolrooms immediately behind the pub and rebuilt it as a music hall in six months. This purpose built hall was his response to the success of Charles Morton's Canterbury Music Hall in Lambeth. In 1861, Morton struck back by opening the Oxford Music Hall, nearby in Oxford Street; a development Weston opposed on the grounds there were already too many music halls in the area.

The theatre was renamed the Royal Music Hall in 1868, and then changed names again in 1892 under the management of Arthur Swanborough (Smith) (1838-1895) and George Burgess (1843-1908), becoming the Royal Holborn Theatre of Varieties. So successful was it in that decade it began to rival Morton's Canterbury Theatre, which was the most popular and profitable in London.

The hall's early and most influential years were presided over by an exacting chairman and master of ceremonies, W. B. Fair, famous for the song Tommy, Make Room for Your Uncle. He chose the acts, warmed the audience up for each succeeding performance, and encouraged them at all times to interact with the performers throughout the evening. Fair was thus responsible for introducing to the London stage some of the most famous music hall acts, including Bessie Bellwood and JH Stead.

The theatre became moribund at the beginning of the 20th century, but was rescued by George Cray, with sketches such as The Fighting Parson.

=== Holborn Empire ===
In 1905 the theatre was bought by the variety impresario Walter Gibbons and in 1906 he had the theatre auditorium remodelled by Frank Matcham at a cost of £30,000; the theatre was renamed the Holborn Empire. The Holborn Empire was the last surviving variety theatre in the West End, also performing special theatrical matinees.

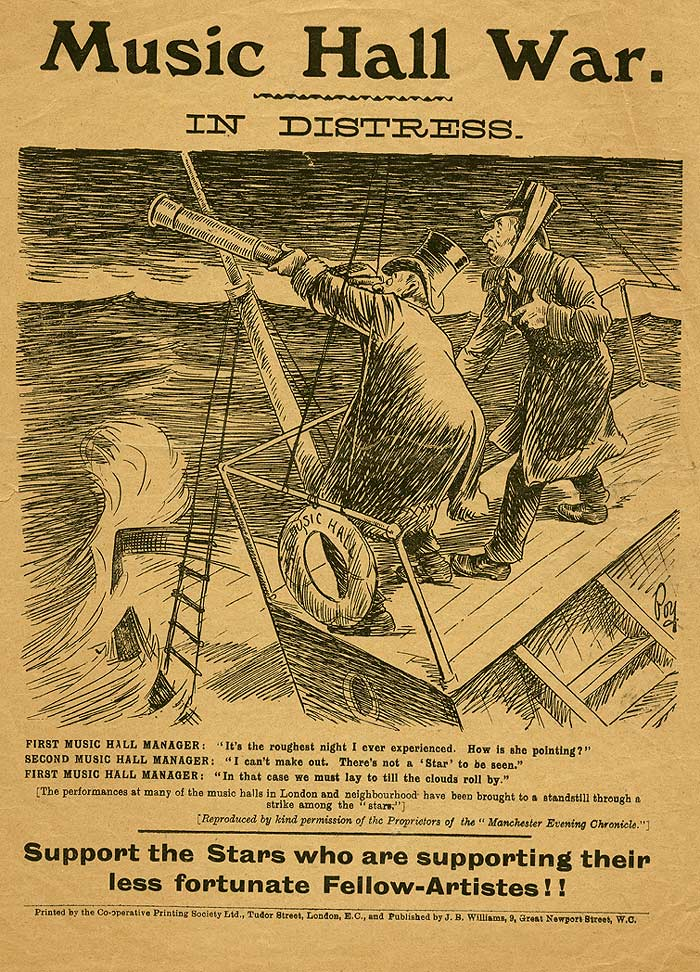
1907 poster from the Music Hall War between artists and theatre managers

On 22 January 1907, a long brewing dispute between artists, stage hands and managers of the theatres came to a head at the Holborn Empire. The artists, musicians and stage hands went on strike. Strikes in other London and suburban halls followed, organised by the Variety Artistes' Federation. The strike came to be known as the Music Hall Wars, and was against the conditions imposed by the managers. These included sole rights to a star and the ability to include additional matinee performances in the schedule without pay, or notice. Eventually the managements were forced to give in, in the face of solidarity by major stars like Marie Lloyd, and additional payments for matinee performances were introduced.

The theatre premièred the first full-length feature film in 1914, The World, the Flesh and the Devil, a 50-minute melodrama filmed in Kinemacolor. In 1926, comedians Flanagan and Allen were booked by Val Parnell for a début at the theatre, and Margaret Lockwood made her first stage appearance at the age of 12, in 1928, as a fairy in A Midsummer Night's Dream.

The Holborn Empire was where Max Miller was taken on by impresario Tom Arnold in 1926, and also where he starred in the George Black revues Haw Haw! (1939), followed by Apple Sauce (1940) featuring Florence Desmond, Jack Stanford and Vera Lynn. The theatre was closed as a result of an unexploded time bomb near the stage door, during the Blitz on the night of 11–12 May 1941, and the show transferred to the London Palladium.

The building was hit the following night by another bomb and too badly damaged to reopen. It was finally pulled down in 1960.
