= Museum Tavern =

Pub in Bloomsbury, London

Coordinates: 51°31′5.52″N 0°7′41.5″W

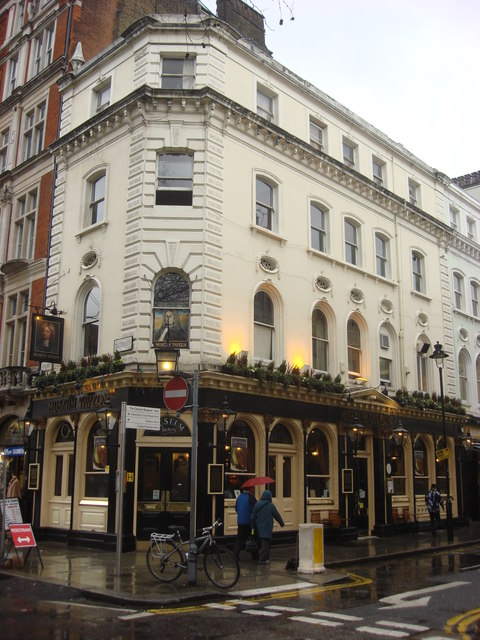
Museum Tavern

The Museum Tavern is a Grade II listed public house at 49 Great Russell Street, Bloomsbury, London.

It was built from about 1855–64 by William Finch Hill and Edward Lewis Paraire. It traces its origins back to 1723. From 1723 to 1762 the pub was called the Dog and Duck (so called because duck hunting was popular in the ponds in the Long Fields behind Montagu House in the 17th and 18th centuries).

It is a CAMRA Heritage Pub, with a Regionally Important historic interior. Unusually, it is a regular outlet for Theakston's Old Peculier on cask.

Karl Marx was a notable regular to the pub as it was near the British Museum Reading Room, where he wrote Das Kapital. The pub is sometimes included as part of the Karl Marx pub crawl.
