= Finch Hill =

British 19th century architect

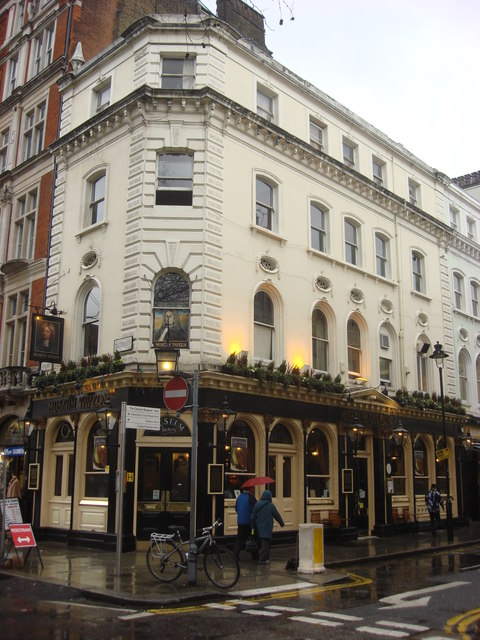
Museum Tavern, London, designed by Finch Hill and Edward Lewis Paraire

William Finch Hill was a British theatre and music hall architect of the Victorian era.

Little is known of Finch Hill's early life; he possibly obtained his early architectural experience in church building. He set himself up as 'surveyor and architect', predominantly building public houses. In 1856, he exhibited his designs for Evans Music-and-Supper Rooms, at the Royal Academy. Between 1856–70, he worked with his partner Edward Lewis Paraire (1826–1882). Together they worked on many music halls and theatres, including Weston's Music Hall (1857), the Islington Philharmonic (1860), the Oxford Music Hall (1861), the Royal Cambridge (1856, in Shoreditch), and the Britannia Theatre (1841, Hoxton) – the last of whose designs was exhibited by Paraire in 1859.

The designs showed "Finch Hill was a master of the opulent but never licentious classicism of the 1850s. Audiences knocked back their beers in sumptuous settings designed by an architect who knew the churches of Gibbs, Archer and Hawksmoor".

The partnership was based in separate houses in the same street, and on its dissolution Paraire returned to designing banks, churches and public houses.

Hill's remaining works can be seen around Museum Street, in Bloomsbury. A row of houses (with shops beneath) together with the Museum Tavern, a public house, are Grade II listed buildings.
