= Lupino family =

British theatre family

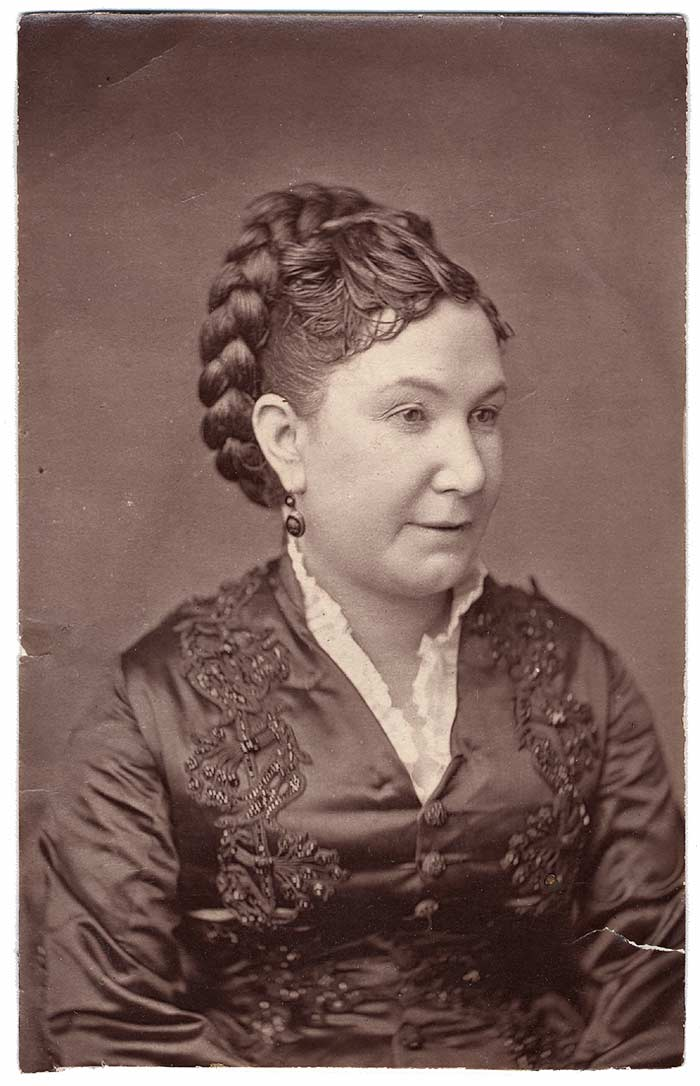
c.1870 Sarah Lane The Queen of Hoxton

The Lupino family (Italian: [luˈpiːno]) is a British theatre family which traces its roots to an Italian émigré of the early 17th century. The "Lupino" name is derived from two unrelated families:

- the original Luppino or Lupino family, seventeenth century emigres from Italy to England
- the later Hook family, which assumed the Lupino surname.

Actress and director Ida Lupino (1918–1995) and theatre and movie actor, dancer, singer, acrobat and author Lupino Lane (Henry George Lupino, 1892–1959), descend from the Hook line.

Several of the Hook family adopted the surname Lane from Sarah Lane, the director of the Britannia Theatre, Hoxton, to whom they were related.

== Family descent ==
=== Luppino family ===
Giorgio Luppino came from a family of Italian puppet makers. He fled to England as a political refugee

George William Luppino (1632–1693), son of Georgius, a singer, reciter and puppet master.

George Charles Luppino (1662-1???), son of George William, a performer and puppeteer from age of 8.

George Charles Luppino II (1683–1723), son of George Charles, a dancer, known as The Motion Master of Long Acre. He married Charlotte Mary Estcourt, daughter of the actor and playwright Richard Estcourt.
George Richard Estcourt Luppino (1710–1787), son of George Charles, a dancer, an apprentice to John Rich, the founder of English Pantomime. He married Rosina Volante, daughter of the rope-dancer and theatre company manager Signora Violante.

Thomas Frederick Luppino (1749–1845), son of George Richard Estcourt, a dancer and scenic artist. He married Elizabeth.

Samuel George Lupino (1766–1830), son of Thomas Frederick, an acrobatic dancer.

Harry Lupino and his son Lupino Lane, in Jack and Jill, 1907–8 at The Prince's Bristol

=== Hook family ===
Unrelated dancer George Hook (George Hook Lupino, 1820–1902) assumed the surname Lupino after working with members of the Lupino family. He became famous in the role of Harlequin and married Rosina Sophia Proctor (1831–1908) and had 16 children, at least 10 of whom became professional dancers, two of them marrying into the family of Sara Lane, manager of the Britannia Theatre Hoxton.

Of George Hook Lupino's 16 children:

- George Lupino (1853–1932), performed in Drury Lane pantomimes of the 1890s, with Dan Leno and was the father of George Barry (Barry) Lupino (1884–1962), Mark Lupino (1889–1930) and Vaudeville performer, actor, and writer Stanley Lupino (1893–1942) (father of Ida)
- Arthur Lupino (1864–1908) Animal impersonator. First to play the role of Nana in Peter Pan in 1904
- Harry Charles Lupino (1867–1925), married into the Lane family and was the father of Lupino Lane (Henry William George Lupino, 1892–1959) and Wallace Lupino (1898–1961).

Other members from this second line include Peter Lupino (1912–1994) and Antoinette Lupino (1921-1982), children of Barry Lupino; and Rita Lupino (1921–2016), sister of Ida.

Living descendants of the Lupino family who maintain the family tradition include Sara Lupino Lane (granddaughter of Lupino Lane), patron of The Music Hall Guild of Great Britain and America, and Patricia Lupino Thompson. Thompson, former principal of a dance school in Manchester, is now a Fellow, examiner, lecturer, technical committee member and director of the International Dance Teachers Association, and a dance adjudicator for the British Federation of Festivals.

=== Selected Lupino family tree - second (Hook) line ===
George Hook Lupino; 1820-1902
George Lupino; 1853-1932	Arthur Lupino; 1864-1908	Harry Charles Lupino; 1867-1925
Barry Lupino; 1884-1962	Mark Lupino; 1889-1930	Stanley Lupino; 1893-1942	Lupino Lane; 1892-1959	Wallace Lupino; 1898-1961
Peter Lupino; 1912-1994	Antoinette Lupino; 1921-1982	Ida Lupino; 1918-1995	Rita Lupino; 1921-2016	Lauri Lupino Lane; 1921-1986	Richard Lupino; 1929-2005
Sara Lupino Lane

== See also ==
- List of entertainment industry dynasties
