= Forever Tarkovsky Club =

Forever Tarkovsky Club 永遠懷念塔可夫斯基
- Origin: Hong Kong
- Genres: Indie rock, pop rock
- Years active: 2007–2009
- Labels: Zoo Records
- Past members: Ah P, Ho Shan, Siu Ding, Thomas Chow, Eddie Cheng...

Forever Tarkovsky Club (traditional Chinese: 永遠懷念塔可夫斯基; simplified Chinese: 永远怀念塔可夫斯基) is a Hong Kong–based indie band made up of Ah P (My Little Airport) and Ho Shan (Pixeltoy). It released its album on July 1, 2009 (a strong symbol, July 1 being the date of a popular protest rally in Hong Kong) and dissolved on July 5, 2009, after a two-night concert they had baptized "All Farewells Should Be Sudden" (and which featured Christina Chan Hau-man). It reunited on January 8, 2010, when Legislative Councillors voted the funding of the controversial Hong Kong - Guangzhou Express Rail, to lend support to the protestors encircling the Legislative Council.

== Origins ==
The band originated from a group of friends who used to meet to watch movies together. The gatherings quickly evolved into sessions, where Ah P would recite disenchanted poems of his own making (dedicated to prostitutes and other sleazy characters) and Ho Shan indulge in experimental rêveries with his guitar. The magic exuding from their informal collaboration eventually drove the pair to form a band in 2007. Because the group started with the screening of movies by the late Russian director Andreï Tarkovski, it was named after him.

The band first hit the newspapers in December 2008, after the controversy raised by their debut concert : "X-Mas Half-Nude Party" (聖誕半裸派對). The naughty Facebook advertisement for the show – a picture of their female friend Siu Ding posing half-nude with Ah P's melodica across her chest – in line with the title of the concert and the music video (the first nude MV Hong Kong had ever seen), had some fear an orgy was on plan. And, although, in reality, "X-Mas Half-nude Party" is but the title of the band's third song, the moral fuss which had developed around the concert prompted the Wan Chai Police to intervene (on the grounds that it is illegal to host a public function in a private premise) and the show was eventually cancelled. The incident inspired the band to write the song "Adventures in Wan Chai Police Station" (灣仔差館奇遇記).

== Style ==
Their debut concert finally took place at Kubrick, a well-known bookstore and cinema located in Yau Ma Tei (which also happens to be workplace of the heroes of Ah P's notorious poems), on December 28, 2008, and took a more respectable name : "Healthy Moral Christmas Party". Disillusioned and cynical yet humorous and enthusiastic, Forever Tarkovsky Club's music revolves around themes such as politics (disguised as a love song, 上街的理由 aims at convincing people to take to the street on July, 1st), poverty ("Don't Sell Flags in Sham Shui Po"), unemployment ("Give Him a Job") and prostitution. A collaborative effort, the band used to invite their friends (Siu Ding, Thomas Chow etc.) to perform on stage and can be said to be part of a new wave of Hong Kong indie bands, more prone to tackle political and social issues.

== Reception ==
A Ming Pao critic said the band's songs "reflect a grassroots and youthful essence". According to the reviewer, the songs "Christmas Half-Naked Party", "The Bay Area Police Station Adventure", and "give him a job" are "unconventional, sharp, and candid". Regarding the song "Tying Up Gwei Lun-mei", the critic wrote, "The fleeting nature of this love is classical, yet carries a lightness reminiscent of the cyber-generation's 'infinite resurrection', embodying a new era's sensibility. It remains niche while speaking to universal emotions." An Apple Daily reviewer characterised the band's works as having "a more gloomy style" compared to My Little Airport songs. The reviewer found that the band's songs talk about themes that mainstream musicians seldom discuss like sex workers and responsibility.

== Album ==
1. give him a job 2. 上街的理由 3. 請不要在深水埗賣旗 4. 灣仔差館奇遇記 5. 綑綁桂綸鎂 6. 我會在暗中保護你 7. 依波拉病毒電影地下鑑賞會 8. 永遠懷念塔可夫斯基會歌 9. 露體狂小丁 10. 聖誕半裸派對

== Trivia ==
All Forever Tarkovsky Club's music videos are edited by Gregor Samsa, a German movie artist : 格勒戈爾.森武沙.
