= Charles Morton (impresario) =

London music hall manager

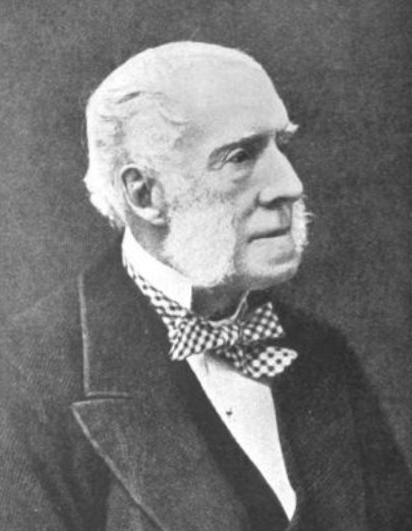
- Born: 15 August 1819; Hackney, London, England
- Died: 18 October 1904 (aged 85); London, England
- Occupation(s): Music hall and theatre manager

Charles Morton (15 August 1819 – 18 October 1904) was a music hall and theatre manager. Born in Hackney, east London, he built the first purpose-built Tavern Music hall, the Canterbury Music Hall, and became known as the Father of the Halls.

== Career ==
=== Canterbury Hall ===
Morton and Frederick Stanley, his brother in law, purchased the Canterbury Arms, in Upper Marsh, Lambeth, south London, in 1849. Morton had been impressed with the entertainments at Evans Music-and-Supper Rooms in Covent Garden and decided to offer a "harmonic meeting", held on Saturdays, in the back room of the public house. Soon, a Thursday evening programme was added to accommodate the crowds and admit women, giving the venue wider appeal than the old-time song and supper rooms, which were male preserves. Entry was free, but the profits from the sale of food and drink allowed the construction in 1852 of a 700-seat hall on the site of an adjacent skittle alley. This made sufficient profit to fund the building of a 1,500 seat hall, around the old hall.

The old building was demolished in one weekend and the New Canterbury opened in December 1856. In 1855, and again in 1856, Morton was prosecuted under the Theatres Act 1843 for the presentation of 'legitimate drama' in sketches – this still being reserved to a small number of licensed theatres. Even this setback was turned to advantage by taking advertisements in The Times – the first such for this type of behaviour.

Their success at the Canterbury allowed Stanley and Morton to build The Oxford, in Holborn, as a competitor to the nearby Weston's Music Hall, opening on 26 March 1861. The pair managed both the Canterbury & Oxford halls, with acts moving between the halls in coaches. With their interests now established in the West End, on Boxing Night 1867, Morton relinquished management of the Canterbury to William Holland.

Acts included Vesta Tilley and Harry Champion.

=== Variety theatre ===
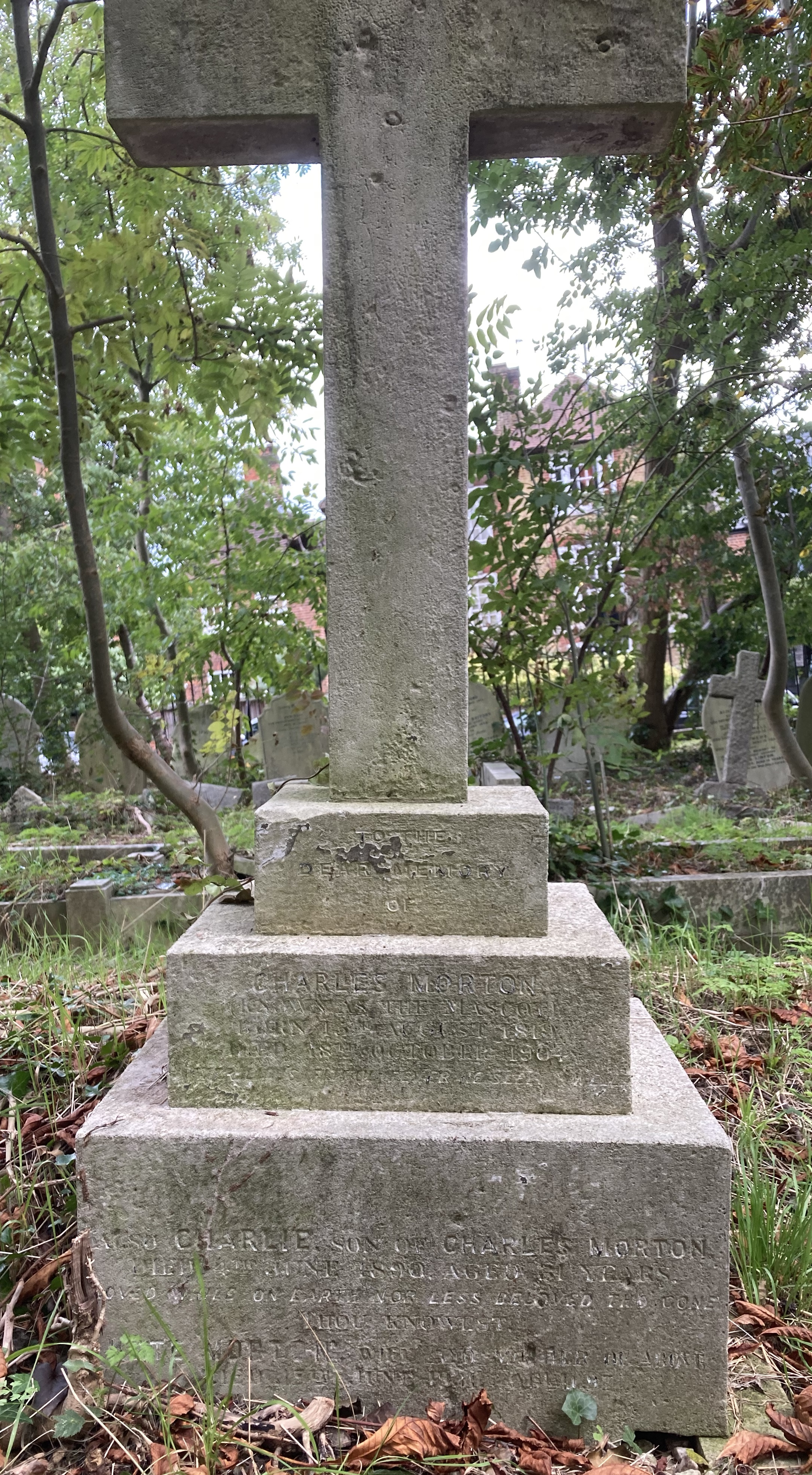
Family grave of Charles Morton in Highgate Cemetery

In 1877, Morton became the manager of the Alhambra Theatre, in Leicester Square. The theatre fell into financial difficulties following the decision by the Middlesex Magistrates not to grant a Music and Dancing Licence in October 1870. It was destroyed by fire in December 1882. Morton took it over and made a success, presenting a programme of variety. The theatre reopened on 18 October 1884, with Morton in charge.

Morton announced his retirement in 1891, but in 1893, at the invitation of Sir Augustus Harris he took over the management of the Palace Theatre of Varieties, which he ran successfully with a programme of variety theatre, until his retirement shortly before his death, at his home in London on 18 October 1904. He is buried in a family grave on the eastern side of Highgate Cemetery.

=== Legacy ===
His biography, Sixty Years Stage Service, was published in 1905 by his brother and Henry Chance Newton, and did much to establish his reputation as The Father of the Halls. Morton appears to have been the first to coin the term "music hall" and popularised the concept through aggressive advertising in The Times.

Many aspects of the entertainment had already been tried elsewhere, especially in the northern provinces and by the 1840s, the artistes themselves had already formed a benevolent society. Morton was able to combine these ideas into a package of entertainments and make them widely popular with many imitators. He went on to anticipate the move from the halls to the large variety theatres of the Edwardian era and to manage some of the most profitable and notable.

== Personal life ==
Morton was a non-smoker and vegetarian.
