= My Little Airport =

Hong Kong indie pop band

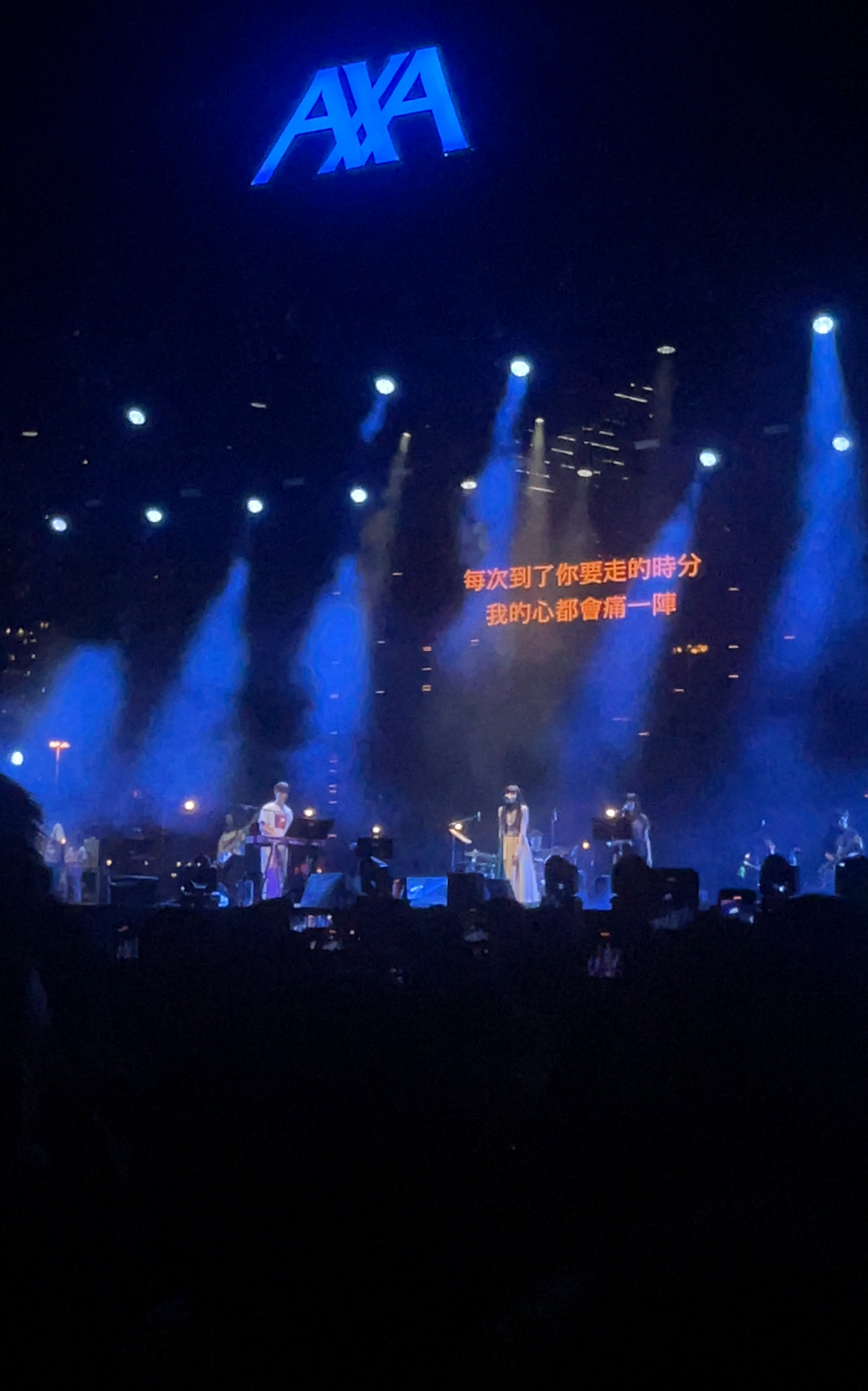
- My Little Airport in 2024

Background information
- Origin: Hong Kong
- Genres: Twee pop, Hong Kong English pop, indie-pop, Cantopop
- Years active: 2004–present
- Labels: Harbour Records, Elefant Records
- Members: Ah P, Nicole
- Website: mylittleairport.com

My Little Airport (stylized as my little airport) (Note: The name of the band is conventionally written with lowercase letters by the band itself on album covers, the band website and the label website.) is a Hong Kong–based indie pop band. They are distinguished by the outspoken political lyrics and distinctive local flavor of their songs, many of which featuring English lyrics influenced by the unique spelling, grammar, and rhythm of Hong Kong English. Since their inception, the band has been actively involved in local political movements, most notably their participation in the Umbrella Movement in 2014, and was banned in mainland China in 2019 for their support of the protests in Hong Kong of the same year. Despite this, My Little Airport continues to be popular on the mainland and is one of the most well-known indie bands in Hong Kong. Their Cantonese songs convey metaphors of politics as well.

The band's lyrics and music are written by Ah P (Lam Pang) and sung by Nicole (Nicole Au Kin-ying). The duo occasionally invites friends (Ah Suet, who speaks French, for instance) and relatives (Nicole's younger sister) to participate in their albums and shows.

== Career ==
The band originated during the duo's time as journalism students at Hong Kong Shue Yan College (now Hong Kong Shue Yan University) in 2001, where they began writing songs in both English and Cantonese. In 2004, the duo, along with four other indie bands from Hong Kong, founded Harbour Records and released their debut album The OK Thing to Do on Sunday Afternoon Is to Toddle in the Zoo. They joined Elefant Records in 2006, hoping to gain distribution beyond Hong Kong's small indie fanbase.

In 2009, the group started writing politically themed songs such as "Divvying Up Stephen Lam's $300,000 salary" (referring to the former Chief Secretary of Hong Kong) and "Donald Tsang, Please Die", the latter of which was written after Tsang suggested that the Tiananmen Square protests of 1989 were insignificant compared to China's current economic power (such social/political themes had already been extensively explored by Ah P with Forever Tarkovsky Club, a side project he had set up with Pixeltoy's Ho Shan between 2007 and 2009).

A fourth album entitled Poetics – Something Between Montparnasse and Mongkok was released on 23 November 2009, which contains many of those politically charged songs. A fifth album entitled Hong Kong is One Big Shopping Mall was released on 26 August 2011, which received numerous awards (including the title of third best album in Cantonese 2011, by Sina Weibo). In October 2012, the band released their sixth album, Lonely Friday, on the Harbour Records label.

On 30 November 2011, Hong Kong arts and culture magazine Muse named My Little Airport Hong Kong's 'Next Big Thing' cultural heroes of 2011. The song "You Don't Wanna Be My Girlfriend, Phoebe" was covered by the Scottish indie band BMX Bandits.

== Style and influence ==
Dubbed the "local indie pop darlings" of Hong Kong by the South China Morning Post, My Little Airport is recognized for their "saccharine vocals and simple, almost dreamlike melodies," as well as the satirical and humorous nature of their lyrics. Their musical style draws inspiration from 60s French singer-songwriter Serge Gainsbourg and has been described as "soft", "quirkily erotic", and "bittersweet".

The duo is also notable for their quirky song titles, often addressed to friends, such as "Leo, Are You Still Jumping Out Of The Windows In Expensive Clothes?" and "Victor, Fly Me to Stafford", or addressed to celebrities, such as "Gigi Leung Is Dead", "Faye Wong, About Your Eyebrows".

== Discography ==
=== Studio albums ===
Release year	Title	Notes
2004	The OK Thing to Do on Sunday Afternoon Is to Toddle in the Zoo	Harbour Records/HRCD002
2005	Becoz I Was Too Nervous At That Time	Harbour Records/HRCD007
2007	We Can't Stop Smoking in the Vicious and Blue Summer	Harbour Records/HRCD010
2009	Poetics – Something between Montparnasse and Mongkok	Harbour Records/HRCD012
2011	Hong Kong is One Big Shopping Mall	Harbour Records/HRCD014
2012	Lonely Friday	Harbour Records
2014	The Right Age for Marriage	Harbour Records
2016	Fo Tan Lai Ki	Harbour Records/HRCD024
2018	You Said We'd Be Back	Harbour Records/HRCD025
2021	Sabina's Tears	Harbour Records/HRCD026
2022	Just Kidding	Harbour Records/HRCD027

=== Compilation albums ===
Release year	Title	Notes
2004	Come Out and Play	Various artists compilation album
2004	In the Name of AMK	Various artists compilation album
2005	Grassland Music (草地音樂合輯)	Various artists compilation album Silent Agreement/SAIP008
2007	Zoo Is Sad, People Are Cruel	Elefant Records/ER-1124

=== Singles ===
Release year	Title	Notes
2005	"Victor, Fly Me to Stafford"	Radio Singles
2005	"I Don't Know How to Download Good Av Like Iris Does"	Radio Singles
2005	"When I Listen to the Field Mice"	CD Singles
2005	"Gigi Leung Is Dead"	CD Singles
2009	"I Love the Country But Not the Party" (我愛郊野, 但不愛派對)	
2021	"Didn't Know Then" (那陣時不知道)	
2021	"If I Let It Out" (因講了出來)	
2021	"Year of Strolling" (散步之年)	
2021	"Every Time You Left" (每次你走的時分)	
2022	"LUNCH"	
2022	"Nausea" (嘔吐)	
2022	"You've Given My" (你把我的)	
2023	"Camel" (駱駝)	Digital release
2024	"Whiskey" (威士忌)	Digital release
