= Signora Violante =

Actor, acrobat & theatre manager (1682–1741)

- Born: 1682; Italy or France
- Died: 1741 (aged 58–59); Edinburgh, Scotland
- Other names: Madam Violante, Signora Larini
- Occupation(s): Rope-dancer, acrobat, actress, theatre company director
- Era: 18th Century
- Style: Commedia dell'arte
- Spouse: Senor Violante

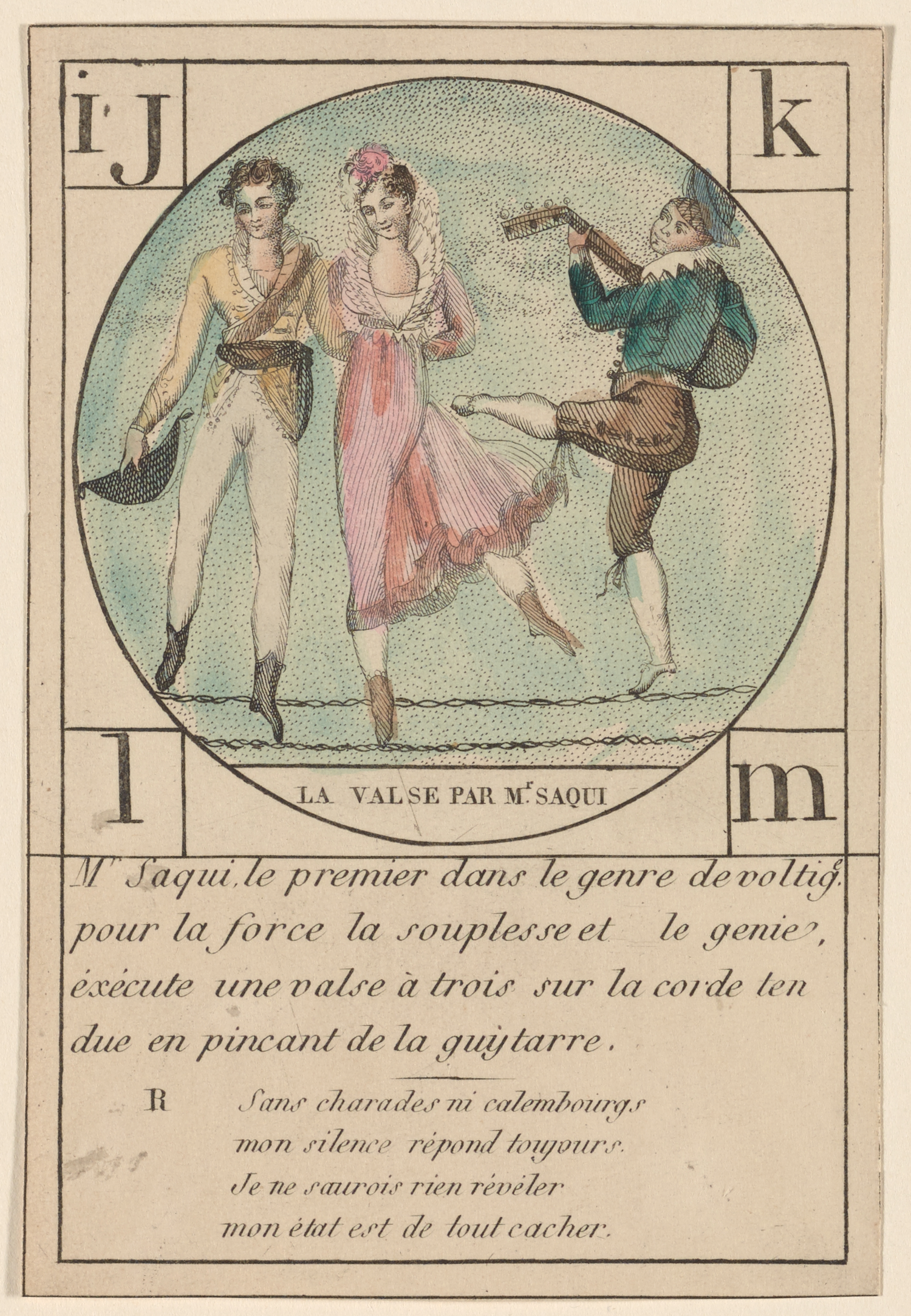
Rope dancing

Signora Violante (1682–1741) was a rope-dancer, acrobat, commedia dell'arte actor and theatre company manager.

== Early life ==
=== Background ===
Signora Violante was Italian or French, and was active as a performer from 1720. She was married to an Italian, Senor Violante, a rope-slider. Neither her maiden or married name are known for certain, and she and her husband are also sometimes named as Larini in contemporary newspaper accounts. She is also known as Madam Violante and Mrs Violante in 18th century sources.

=== Family ===
Her children were among the performers in her troupe. Her daughter Rosina Violante, a dancer, later married dancer George Richard Estcourt Luppino, son of dancers George Charles Luppino and Charlotte Mary Estcourt, and forebear of the Lupino family of performers and designers.

== Career ==
Violante's first appearances in London, in the spring of 1720, were working with De Grimbergue's French company at the King's Theatre and Lincoln's Inn Fields theatres. Her performances in these shows included rope dancing with flags, sometimes advertised in bills as "The Flourishing of the Colours"; her rope-dancing inspired a poem published in Oxoniensis on 6 June 1720. Another reported act of Violante's was, while on the slack rope, to dance a minuet, with a child hanging from each ankle. In 1727 Violante is said to have danced on the tight rope with swords tied to her legs, a child balanced on her shoulders, and two children on her ankles.

Violante returned to London in 1726 to the Haymarket Theatre, where she stayed for a season of 70 nights, performing acrobatics, dancing and pantomime, between 2 November 1726 and 28 April 1727. She was in Dublin in 1727, and returned to London's Haymarket Theatre with a new company to perform regularly from 23 October to 6 May 1728, including a pantomime The Rivals in which she featured in the role of Colombina. The company performed The Rivals in Bristol in the summer of 1728, where her husband Senor Violante slid on a rope across the River Severn, from St Vincent's Rocks in Clifton, a distance of 550 yards in thirty seconds, before a crowd of spectators.

Violante had a large impact on the Dublin theatre scene of the early 18th century. She worked in Dublin for three theatre seasons, during which time, in 1730, Violante and her principal dancer Lalauze established the Dame Street Booth, a rival to the Theatre Royal, Smock Alley in Dublin.

She then travelled to Edinburgh where she lived in Carruber's Close. In Edinburgh, magistrates refused her company permission to perform in their jurisdiction. after this, her company performed throughout Britain, and it is possible they also performed in Paris. One show was a pirated version of The Beggar's Opera, the cast of which included Peg Woffington, whom Violante "discovered" as a child, carrying water to her mother's wash-house, and subsequently coached.

In 1735 Signora Violante settled in Edinburgh, where she rented the lower floor of the hall of the Incorporation of Mary's Chapel from 1738 and continued to perform as a rope-dancer, and ran a dance school.

== Death ==
Signora Violante died in 1741.
