= Zoo Is Sad, People Are Cruel =

Compilation album by My Little Airport
- Released: June 25, 2007
- Genre: Indie pop Cantopop
- Length: 31:59
- Label: Elefant Records; ER-1124

My Little Airport chronology
Becoz i was too nervous at that time (2005)	Zoo Is Sad, People Are Cruel (2007)	We Can't Stop Smoking In The Vicious And Blue Summer (2007)

Zoo Is Sad, People Are Cruel is a 14 track compilation album by the Hong Kong indie pop group My Little Airport released in 2007 by Spain-based label Elefant Records. Nearly all the tracks are selected from the two previously released studio albums of My Little Airport except "When I Listen To The Field Mice" and "Mountaintop, Doll, Lollypop" (山頂,公仔,波板糖).

== Track listing ==
1. "Edward, Had You Ever Thought That the End of the World Would Come on 20.9.01?"
2. "The OK Thing To Do On Sunday Afternoon Is To Toddle In The Zoo" (在動物園散步才是正經事)
3. "Gigi Leung Is Dead"
4. "Victor, Fly Me To Stafford"
5. "Leo, Are You Still Jumping Out of Windows in Expensive Clothes?"
6. "I Don’t Know How To Download Good AV Like Iris Does"
7. "You Smile Like A Blossom" (你的微笑像朵花)
8. "Josephine's Shop"
9. "When I Listen To The Field Mice"
10. "Mountaintop, Doll, Lollypop" (山頂,公仔,波板糖)
11. "My Little Banana"
12. "Because I Was Too Nervous At That Time" (只因當時太緊張)
13. "You Don't Wanna Be My Girlfriend, Phoebe"
14. "Dee, It May All End Tomorrow"
