= Walking in the Zoo =

1869 song by Alfred Lee and Hugh Willoughby Sweny

- Sheet music for "Walking in the Zoo"

Song
- Published: 1869
- Composer(s): Alfred Lee
- Lyricist(s): Hugh Willoughby Sweny

"Walking in the Zoo" is a popular English music hall song published in 1869. It was composed by Alfred Lee with lyrics by Hugh Willoughby Sweny, and was first and most successfully performed by Alfred Vance, billed as "The Great Vance".

The song is notable for first popularising, in Britain, both the Americanism "O.K.", and the word "zoo" as a short form of "zoological gardens" – specifically, the London Zoological Gardens. It also introduced to British audiences the American slang word "skedaddle". The song's chorus goes: "Walking in the Zoo, walking in the Zoo / The O.K. thing on Sunday is walking in the Zoo"; and a verse contains the lines "My cousin bolted off without any more ado / And I skidaddled also looking very blue."
