= Tommy Trinder =

English stage, screen and radio comedian (1909–1989)

Tommy Trinder CBE
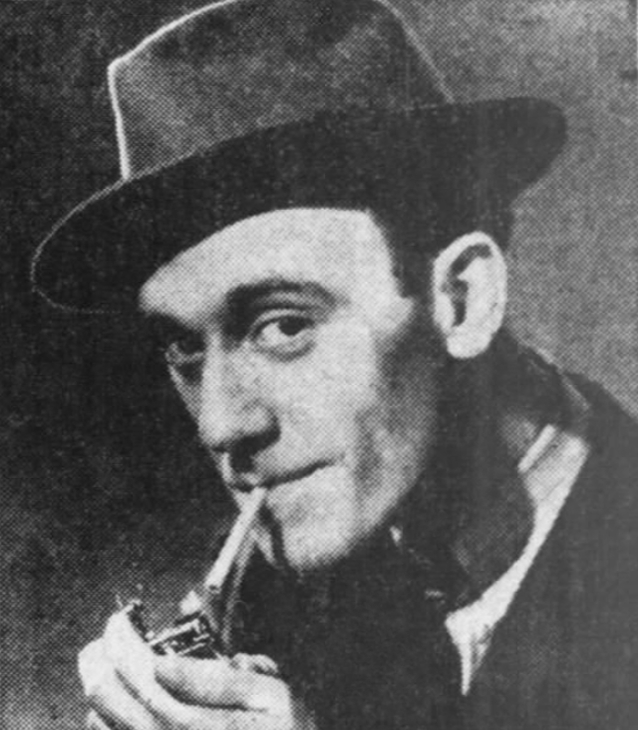
- Trinder in 1947
- Born: Thomas Edward Trinder; 24 March 1909; Streatham, London, England
- Died: 10 July 1989 (aged 80); Chertsey, Surrey, England
- Occupation: Comedian

Thomas Edward Trinder (24 March 1909 – 10 July 1989) was an English stage, screen and radio comedian whose catchphrase was "You lucky people!". Described by cultural historian Matthew Sweet as "a cocky, front-of-cloth variety turn", he was one of the United Kingdom's foremost entertainers during the Second World War.

Known for his confident and direct style of comedy, Trinder first found recognition with his music hall revues in the late 1930s. During the war, he worked for ENSA and maintained a successful film career, starring in a string of Ealing Studios films including Sailors Three (1940), Champagne Charlie (1944) and Bitter Springs (1950). Triinder achieved television success in the 1950s, notably as the original host of Sunday Night at the London Palladium (1955–1958). In 1959, he was became the chairman of Fulham Football Club, a position he maintained until 1976. He continued to perform into the 1980s.

== Biography ==
=== Early life (1909–1937) ===
Tommy Trinder was born at 54 Wellfield Road, Streatham, South London, on 24 March 1909, the son of Thomas Henry Trinder, a London tram driver from Shilton, Oxfordshire, and his Scottish wife Jennie Georgina Harriet (née Mills). The family moved to Fulham after Trinder's father was transferred to Hammersmith. As a boy, Trinder would sneak into Fulham Football Club's Craven Cottage ground when the Thames was at low tide to watch the club play.

Trinder left school early for a job as an errand boy. He made his first stage appearance at the age of twelve in a talent competition at Collins's Music Hall. Trinder's singing act won the contest and when collecting his award, he was approached by Will Murray who recruited him for his Casey's Court juvenile comedy show. Trinder made his first appearance with the company on 5 June 1921 in Oldham. The company, which also featured Jimmy Wheeler at the time, toured music halls including Sunderland Empire Theatre.

After a few years with Casey's Court, Trinder then joined a dancing act called Phil Rees' Stable Lads. At the age of 14, he performed with them at Folies Bergère, Paris. By 1926, the 17-year-old Trinder was the star of Archie Pitt's travelling variety comedy shows, often appearing at the Queen's Theatre, Poplar, London. Trinder also performed in concert parties and working men's clubs. By the mid-1930s, Trinder was appearing in variety shows across the United Kingdom with an act titled "The Load of Nonsense".

=== Stardom and Ealing Studios (1937–1950) ===
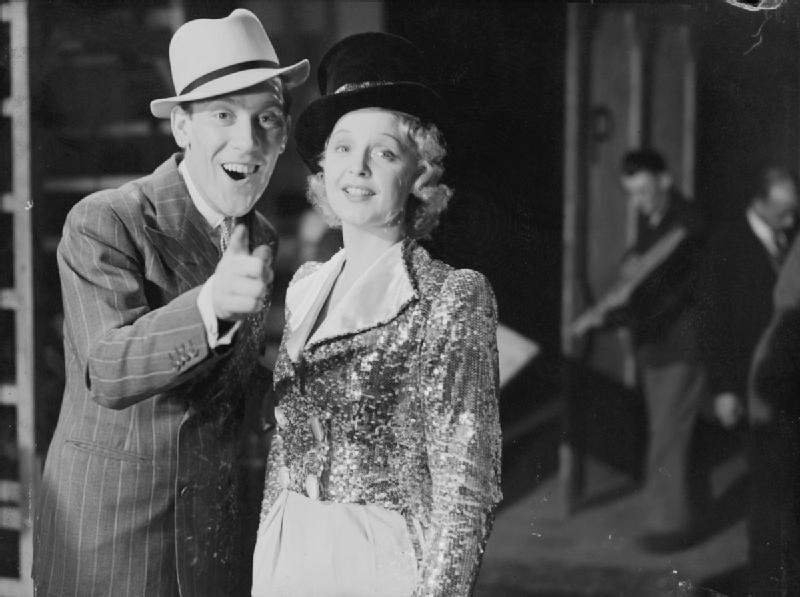
Trinder with Jean Colin during the making of Communal Kitchen: Eating Out With Tommy Trinder for the Ministry of Information in 1941

Trinder began to achieve national recognition in 1937 with the touring revues Tune In and In Town Tonight. Trinder's stage persona was confident and cheeky with what historian Matthew Sweet has described as a "transcendental self-belief" typified by his "you lucky people!" catchphrase. His act was fast-talking and direct, with topical allusions and ad libs. Trinder would often begin his act with "The name's Trinder. That's T-R-I-N-D-E-R, pronounced Chumley", a dig at the upper classes. In December 1938, Trinder was spotlighted in an end-of-year review in The Era, who said "Tommy Trinder has established himself firmly in his own special niche, as we knew he would. But it is not a niche easy of attainment. To abolish deliberately the proscenium, to get down among the audience, treat individual members of it with easy familiarity, pinch their cigarettes and chocolates and to be loved for doing it... well, I have seen other artists try something like it, and their reward has been the frozen face and the indignant murmur. Tommy Trinder is a truly great artist". In July 1939, Trinder starred alongside Arthur Askey in Jack Hylton's stage version of the BBC's radio comedy series Band Waggon at the London Palladium.

By the time of the Second World War, Trinder was one of Britain's foremost entertainers and regularly appeared in his own shows at the London Palladium. He performed for British armed forces personnel as part of ENSA (Entertainments National Service Association) and would joke that the organisation’s name stood for Every Night Something Atrocious. Trinder would later dub its successor CSE (Combined Services Entertainment) "Chaos Supersedes ENSA". In 1941, he appeared in Eating Out with Tommy Trinder, a public information film promoting wartime British Restaurants.

Trinder was known for his self-promotion and claimed that, had he not entered showbusiness, he would have worked in publicity. When appearing in George Black's musical revue Happy and Glorious in 1944, he arranged for large posters to be displayed across London bearing the slogan "If it's laughter you're after, Trinder's the name". One of the posters, in the East End of London, was in Yiddish. The Stage has described Trinder as one of the first artists to recognise the importance of advertising.

Trinder began a film career in 1938, making his film debut in Welwyn Studios' Save a Little Sunshine. He starred alongside Pat Kirkwood, who later described him as "rude and insulting and downright nasty". Trinder was then signed up to Michael Balcon's Ealing Studios when it became clear that George Formby was to be wooed away. His first work for the company was the comedy Sailors Three (1940), about three British sailors (Trinder, Claude Hulbert and Michael Wilding) who accidentally find themselves aboard a German pocket battleship. It was Trinder's most successful comedy film and one of its featured songs "All Over The Place" (words by Frank Eyton; music by Noel Gay) was among the most popular of the war. In 1944, Trinder starred in the musical film Champagne Charlie, playing the 19th-century music hall performer George Leybourne opposite Stanley Holloway as his peer Alfred Vance. In the same year, Trinder appeared in Fiddlers Three, a loose sequel to Sailors Three. He also took straight acting parts, playing an army driver in charge of a gang of French refugee children in The Foreman Went to France (1942) and a AFS fireman in The Bells Go Down (1943). Bitter Springs (1950) has been described as Trinder's last significant film and features the comedian as a failing travelling conjuror who makes a new life as a stockman in the Australian Outback.

=== Tours and television (1950–1960) ===
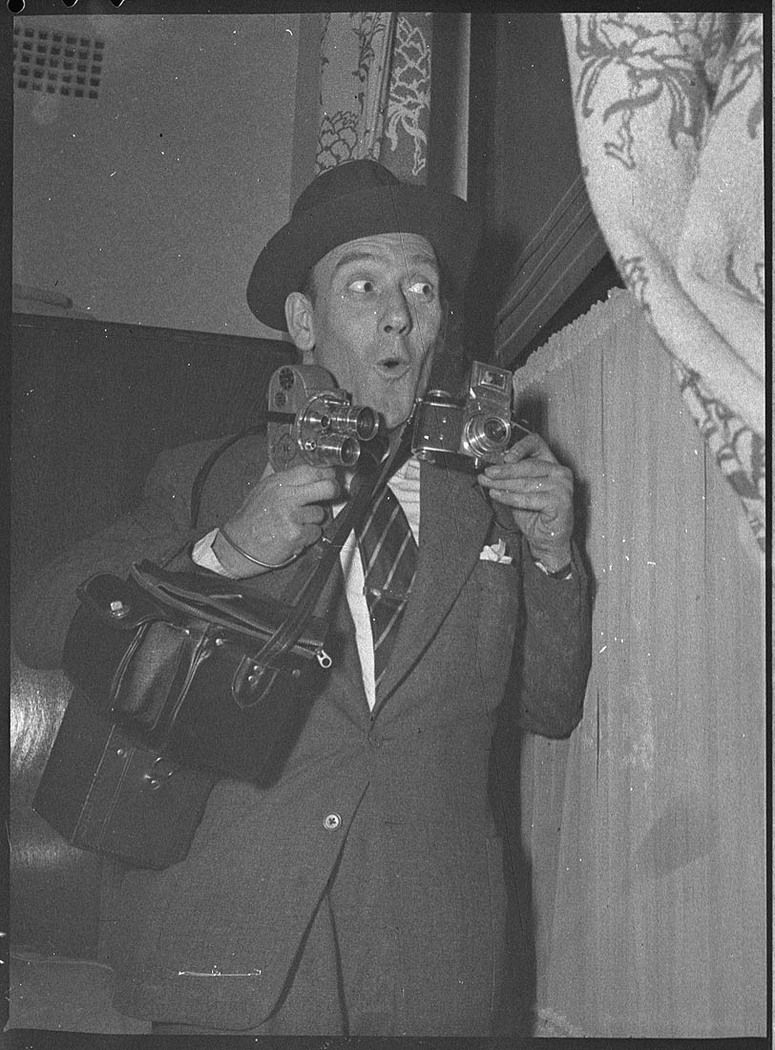
Trinder in New South Wales, 1954

After the war, Trinder concentrated mainly on his stage act. He attempted to break America, appearing on a New York bill with Frank Sinatra in the spring of 1950. Advertised as "the English Bob Hope", Trinder found the American audience "not as friendly towards English artists as English audiences are to American" and never returned. In 1952, Trinder began a tour of Australia scheduled to last three months. Upon his arrival in Sydney, he described himself as "just a pommy trying to make good". Trinder ultimately stayed in the country for almost two years. Whilst there, he raised £150,000 for charities and was consequently made life governor of 19 hospitals. Upon his return to Britain in June 1954, he observed great changes in the types of entertainers heading variety bills. He began to work in television, describing the medium as "a powerful, but legitimate, rival to the theatre".

In 1955, Trinder became the original compere for the ATV television programme Sunday Night at the London Palladium. A live variety show featuring the game show segment Beat the Clock, the programme regularly attracted an estimated twelve million viewers. As he had in his stage act, Trinder often included pointed topical gags in the programme, a feature that sometimes proved controversial. Among Trinder's targets were fellow entertainers Bob Monkhouse, Liberace and Frank Sinatra. Explaining his position in 1956, he commented "It is expected of me to make jokes about current topical items of interest. I gag about Lady Docker and Diana Dors. If I happen to be in the news, I gag about myself."

In October 1957, Trinder mounted a successful tour of South Africa. Sunday Night used a number of guest presenters in his absence. Trinder returned to Britain in March 1958 to complete the series. Having offended the managing director of ATV, Val Parnell, and his deputy, Lew Grade, on multiple occasions, Trinder was dropped after the end of the series. He was replaced by Bruce Forsyth, a younger comedian widely considered similar to Trinder who had previously appeared as a guest on the show. In 1967, Trinder and Forsyth appeared together in a pantomime production arranged to ensure the two would not share a scene.

In 1955, Trinder lent his catchphrase to his first film in five years, Adelphi Films' You Lucky People!. On 28 February 1956, he appeared on American television in an edition of The Bob Hope Chevy Show broadcast from London. Beginning in 1957, Trinder was a regular panellist on the BBC Light Programme radio show Does the Team Think?. In May 1959, he was the subject of the 100th edition of This Is Your Life when he was surprised by Eamonn Andrews. He moved to the BBC to host his own television series, Trinder Box, in 1959. The programme was short-lived, as was a 1960 comedy quiz show It's Only Money. Trinder never fully warmed to the medium of television, believing that the amount of daily rehearsal sapped performances of their spontaneity.

=== Fulham FC (1960–1976) ===
Trinder was a lifelong supporter of Fulham Football Club. By 1948, he was a director at the club and from 1959 until 1976, he was chairman of the club. In this position, Trinder championed the midfielder Johnny Haynes. Confident that football's £20 maximum wage would remain in place, Trinder told Haynes that he would pay him £100 a week if he could. He repeated this to the press, telling them "If he asks for it, who am I to deny it to the best player in the world?". The wage cap was lifted in 1961 and Trinder kept his word. The rise kept Haynes from signing with A.C. Milan and he remained with Fulham until 1970. The Daily Mail sports columnist J. L. Manning described Trinder's move as "a bold, brave and sensible application of soccer’s New Deal". During his chairmanship, Trinder continued to perform in provincial theatres, pantomime and holiday camps and jokes about Fulham became a regular part of his act. He also continued to make occasional film appearances.

Trinder's television appearances were largely limited to guest spots on programmes including The Dickie Valentine Show during the 1960s. In May 1964, he reprised his Champagne Charlie character in the first of several appearances on the BBC music hall programme The Good Old Days. Later that year, Trinder adapted to the satire boom with appearances in six episodes of the BBC series Not So Much a Programme, More a Way of Life.

Trinder performed before the British royal family in six Royal Variety Performances between 1945 and 1980. From 1937 onwards, he was a member of the exclusive entertainment fraternity, the Grand Order of Water Rats. He served three non-consecutive terms as its "King Rat" in 1955, 1963 and 1965. In 1956, Trinder was President of the Lord's Taverners cricketing charity. Trinder celebrated 50 years in showbusiness in 1971. In 1975, he was appointed a CBE for services to charity.

=== Final years and death (1976–1989) ===
In later years, Trinder performed in pantomime, appeared in holiday camps and worked as a warm-up act for Tyne Tees Television in Newcastle. In his act, he would often make bitter allusions to Lew and Leslie Grade and his reaction to new trends in his sphere was "isn’t the 'alternative' to comedy just straight acting?". One notable latter-day television appearance was in a 1979 edition of The Old Boy Network (BBC2), with Trinder performing his act at Great Yarmouth's Windmill Theatre and presenting a condensed history of his life and career. In 1982, Trinder was reported to be earning only £17 a week in a summer season in Jersey. The following year, he was hospitalised after collapsing whilst appearing in the pantomime Aladdin and His Wonderful Lamp and was said to have been experiencing exhaustion. Trinder collapsed on stage again during a show in Rotherham in April 1985 and during a Burton-on-Trent show in January 1986.

After a stroke, Trinder used a wheelchair for the remainder of his life. He continued to work, appearing on television in the game show The Parlour Game. He made his last television appearance in February 1989, recalling his contemporary Max Miller in the BBC 40 Minutes documentary I Like The Girls Who Do. The same year, he came out of stage retirement to make a final appearance at the London Palladium in a variety show celebrating the founding of BBC local radio. An exhibition of photographs and ephemera was held at Streatham Library in March 1989 to mark Trinder's 80th birthday. He died at St Peter's Hospital, Chertsey on 10 July 1989. Among the tributes, Ernie Wise described Trinder as "one of the best ad lib comedians we have ever produced – he was in the same class as Max Miller". The BBC repeated Trinder's edition of The Old Boy Network on 25 July.

== Personal life ==
=== Family and relationships ===
Trinder married Violet Bailey in 1932. In 1939, the couple moved into Du Cane Court, an Art Deco apartment block on Balham High Road, Balham, South London. According to biographer Patrick Newley, Violet grew to dislike Trinder so much that she refused to laugh at his jokes. After the couple separated and subsequently divorced, Trinder then married Gwyn (Toni) Lancelyn Green and moved to a large private estate, Burwood Park in Hersham, Surrey.

=== Political views ===
Interviewed in 1968, Trinder expressed admiration for the Labour Party politician Barbara Castle.

== Legacy ==
A biography by Patrick Newley, You Lucky People! – The Tommy Trinder Story, was published by Third Age Press in 2008. Trinder was placed 83rd in Channel 4's The 100 Greatest Stand-Ups in 2007. In 2010, comedian Ross Noble campaigned for people to vote for Trinder in an online poll for an updated version of the list, saying "Tommy Trinder was a top act and it would be funny to have an act from the 50s top the list. Last time I was ahead of Lenny Bruce so it's bollocks anyway". The campaign received support from fellow comics Tim Minchin, Alan Davies, Jason Manford and Viz co-founder Simon Donald. Trinder ultimately placed 44th in the 2010 list. In August 2009, BFI Southbank celebrated Trinder's centenary with a season of his film work.

== Filmography ==
- 1938 – Save a Little Sunshine
- 1938 – Almost a Honeymoon
- 1939 – She Couldn't Say No
- 1940 – Laugh It Off
- 1940 – Sailors Three (US: Three Cockeyed Sailors)
- 1942 – The Foreman Went to France
- 1943 – The Bells Go Down
- 1944 – Champagne Charlie
- 1944 – Fiddlers Three (US: While Nero Fiddled)
- 1950 – Bitter Springs
- 1955 – You Lucky People!
- 1959 – Make Mine a Million
- 1963 – The Damned (US: These are the Damned)
- 1964 – The Beauty Jungle (US: Contest Girl)
- 1969 – Under the Table You Must Go (documentary)
- 1974 – Barry McKenzie Holds His Own
