= Betty Warren =

English actress (1907–1990)

Betty Warren as Bessie Bellwood in Champagne Charlie (1944)

Babette Hilda Hogan (31 October 1907 – 15 December 1990), known professionally as Betty Warren, was a British actress active from the 1930s to the 1950s. She was best known for her comedy roles in Champagne Charlie (1944) and Passport to Pimlico (1949).

== Life and career ==
Born in Fareham, Hampshire, England, she appeared in Goody Two Shoes at the Prince's Theatre in Bristol from 1930 to 1931, and in the musical play Balalaika, which opened in London at the Adelphi Theatre on 22 December 1936 and which ran for 569 performances. In 1945, she appeared in the 'musical extravaganza' Magic Carpet at the Princes Theatre in London.

In 1933 she married the composer Lawrence Wright, who published under the name Horatio Nicholls. In 1947 she remarried, to the trumpet virtuoso Lloyd Shakespeare.

Warren's first film appearance was in Magyar Melody in 1939. This was followed by The Farmer's Wife (1941), Secret Mission (1942), Variety Jubilee (1943), They Met in the Dark (1943), Champagne Charlie (1944, as Bessie Bellwood), The Magic Bow (1946), Passport to Pimlico (1949, with Stanley Holloway), So Long at the Fair (1950), and Tread Softly Stranger (1958).

Her television work included three episodes of Douglas Fairbanks, Jr., Presents (1953–1954). She toured the United Kingdom in 1955 in the first production of Sandy Wilson's The Buccaneer.

Betty Warren died in Yeovil, Somerset, England in 1990, aged 83.
