= Britannia Theatre =

Coordinates: 51.530°N 0.080°W

- Royal Britannia Saloon and Britania Tavern; 1913–1940 Gaumont Cinema
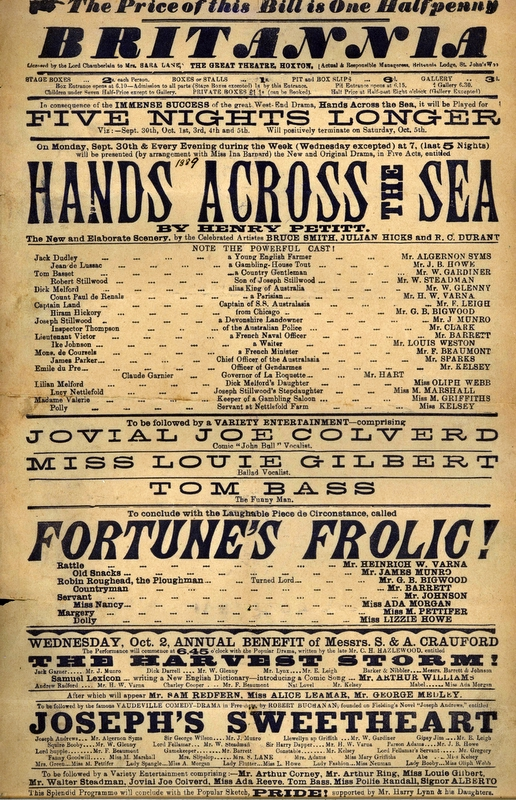
- c.1890 Playbill
- Interactive map of Britannia Theatre
- Address: Hoxton High Street (now Hoxton Street); Hackney, London
- Owner: Sam and Sarah Lane
- Capacity: 3000 seated and standing
- Type: Theatre, melodrama and pantomime
- Designation: Demolished
- Current use: Block of flats (on site)

Construction
- Opened: Easter Monday 1841
- Rebuilt: 1858 Finch Hill and Edward Lewis Paraire
- Years active: 1840–1900 (circa)

The Britannia Theatre (1841–1900) was located at 115/117 High Street, Hoxton, London. The theatre was badly damaged by a fire in 1900, forcing the sale of the lease. The site was reused as a Gaumont cinema from 1913 to 1940, before being demolished to make room for a more modern cinema which was never built. Housing has now been built on the site, which is marked by a London Borough of Hackney historic plaque.

A typical night's entertainment at the Britannia Theatre would include 3–4 plays, with variety acts in the intervals between. Many music hall acts would appear during the interval, and sometimes their acts were woven into the performance. The plays varied, from Shakespeare, Victorian melodrama and comedy. During the winter season pantomime was performed.

Unusually for a theatre, food and drink were served in the auditorium, in the style of contemporary music halls.

== History ==
=== Origins ===
Samuel Haycraft Lane was born in Lympstone, Devon in 1803. In 1821, he decided to escape the life of a fisherman and walk to London. After living hand to mouth and educating himself, with the help of a friend, William Brian, he encountered a troupe of actors who he had previously met on his journey. He helped the leader of the troupe, Jack Adams, to find premises for performance at the Union Tavern in Shoreditch. This hall catered for 500–seated and a similar number standing. Jack Adam's company performed a successful programme of drama, song, dance and acrobatics. Sam married Jack's daughter Mary, in 1835.

The troupe always had ambitions to perform serious drama, and in 1839, the company performed Othello, breaking the law on theatrical performance, as they were not a patent theatre. Lane lost his licence and paid a substantial fine. With the increase in London's population, and the increasing popularity of live entertainment, the law was finally changed with the Theatres Act 1843.

In 1840, Lane and his colleagues thought they had identified a loophole whereby performances could be offered without charge, with profits made from the sale of programmes, food and drink. The Britannia Tavern in Hoxton was identified as suitable premises. This was the former Pimlico tea gardens, an Elizabethan tavern and had a large hall attached, holding about 1,000 people. The Royal Britannia Saloon and Brittania Tavern was opened on Easter Monday 1841 by Sam Lane. The theatre was a success. Sadly, private life was more difficult, Mary became pregnant, and slipped and fell at a rehearsal, both she and the baby died. By 1858 having purchased the leases of surrounding properties, the theatre was rebuilt in larger form, with 3,000 seats. This building designed by Finch Hill, consisting of two circles, a pit and a gallery and had a reported record attendance of 4,790.

The Britannia was notable for melodramas. These included The String of Pearls (1847), the first stage adaptation of the story of Sweeney Todd, written specifically for this venue by George Dibdin Pitt. The theatre had a resident dramatist, C.H. Hazlewood, who wrote many melodramatic spectacles for it, often based on successful novels of the time, including an adaptation of Lady Audley's Secret (1863).

Sam married Sarah Borrow in 1843. She was the daughter of an old friend, William Borrow, who Lane had appointed to a managerial position in the Britannia. On Lane's death in 1871, Sarah, succeeded him as proprietor and manager, and continued until her own death in August 1899. She appeared regularly as principal boy, in the Britannia's annual pantomimes and in the annual benefit night, appearing in a final tableaux as The Queen of Hoxton. Her name "appeared on . . . playbills as the author of a series of plays translated and adapted from the French." Sarah Lane made her last stage appearance at the Britannia's 1898 Christmas show, aged 76. Large crowds lined the route of her funeral procession from the theatre to Kensal Green Cemetery. Her estate was valued at a quarter of a million pounds, a significant sum in 1889.

=== Dickens' description ===
Charles Dickens was a frequent visitor to the theatre, and noted in the Uncommercial Traveller (1861):

Magnificently lighted by a firmament of sparkling chandeliers, the building was ventilated to perfection. [...] The air of this theatre was fresh, cool, and wholesome. [...] It has been constructed from the ground to the roof, with a careful reference to sight and sound in every corner; the result is, that its form is beautiful, and that the appearance of the audience, as seen from the proscenium -- with every face in it commanding the stage, and the whole so admirably raked and turned to that centre, that a hand can scarcely move in the great assemblage without the movement being seen from thence -- is highly remarkable in its union of vastness with compactness. The stage itself, and all its appurtenances of machinery, cellarage, height, and breadth, are on a scale more like the Scala at Milan. or the San Carlo at Naples, or the Grand Opera at Paris, than any notion a stranger would be likely to form of the Britannia Theatre at Hoxton, a mile north of St Luke’s Hospital in the Old-street-road, London. The Forty Thieves might be played here, and every thief ride his real horse, and the disguised captain bring in his oil jars on a train of real camels, and nobody be put out of the way. This really extraordinary place is an achievement of one man’s enterprise, and was erected on the ruins of an inconvenient old building, in less than five months, at a round cost of five-and-twenty thousand pounds.

=== King Doo-Dah ===
A review of King Doo-Dah, the Christmas pantomime, 1900, at the Britannia Theatre, appeared in the News of the World:

Biggest, brightest best, and jolliest pantomime ever produced at "The Brit," is the Hoxtonian verdict upon Mr. Crauford's latest Christmas production, King Doo-Dah. Indeed, the fourteen scenes that are utilised in telling the story are so full of good things that it would be quite impossible to do justice to them in the space at our command. The ever-popular Albert and Edmunds troupe, assisted by Mr. Fred Lawrence and the Montrose Bros., very clever and humorous acrobats, keep the fun at boiling point from start to finish. Mr. H.G. Sharplin made an imposing figure as Cerberus, his magnificent voice delighting the vast audience. Miss Josephine Henley looked a dapper little Prince, and Miss Emmie Ames a charming Princess. Her first song, "Matilda," in which she introduces several mechanical toys with excellent effect, brought down the house. Miss Lily Sharplin's imitations of Marie Collins, Bessie Wentworth, and Billie Barlow, were the best we have seen. The same young lady also fetched the audience with a clever descriptive song, "The Language London Talks." The Imperial Russian Troupe of Singers and Dancers are an innovation in pantomime. Their singing and dancing were so excellent that they scored one of the greatest successes of the evening. Miss Emma Chambers, as a high class domestic, was quaint and humorous, and Miss Kate Sharplin sang sweetly as Titania. In fact, there was not a mediocre character in the whole show. The flying ballet, concluding with a shower of gold, was really magnificent, as was the grand transformation scene. The pantomime does the greatest credit to the talents of the Britannia's popular stage manager, Mr. Bigwood, and is a distinct score for Mr. Crauford.

=== Lupino family ===
George Hook Lupino, c. 1890

The Lupinos were a theatrical family who often claimed that their scion arrived in England in 1620, as a penniless refugee. George William Lupino was a puppeteer and the family continued to earn a theatrical living becoming associated with the harlequinade at Drury Lane. George Lupino Hook (1820–1902) adopted the stage name Lupino from performing with the family and was associated with the Britannia, performing in leading roles and taking the role of Harlequin in pantomime. A prolific man, reputed to have had 16 children, many became singers, dancers and actors, receiving their first experience in the company. The eldest son, civil registration as George Emanuel Samuel Hook (1853–1932) became both a clown and a prominent actor, amongst his grandchildren was the Hollywood actress Ida Lupino. Lupino Lane was the son of Harry Charles Lupino (1825–1925), a favourite of Sarah Lane and pursued a career in films and musical theatre. Lupino Lane originated The Lambeth Walk, in the 1937 musical Me and My Girl'.

=== Fire and refit ===
Soon after the 1900 pantomime, a serious fire damaged the building. The cost of bringing the building up to standard, forced the sale of the lease. It came into the hands of the Gaumont organisation, and became a cinema in 1913. The original theatre was demolished to make way for a modern cinema which was never built because of the war. In 1940 the nearby Toy Theatre [Pollock's Toy Museum], was destroyed in World War II by German bombing but the theatre building had already gone by this time.

== Legacy ==
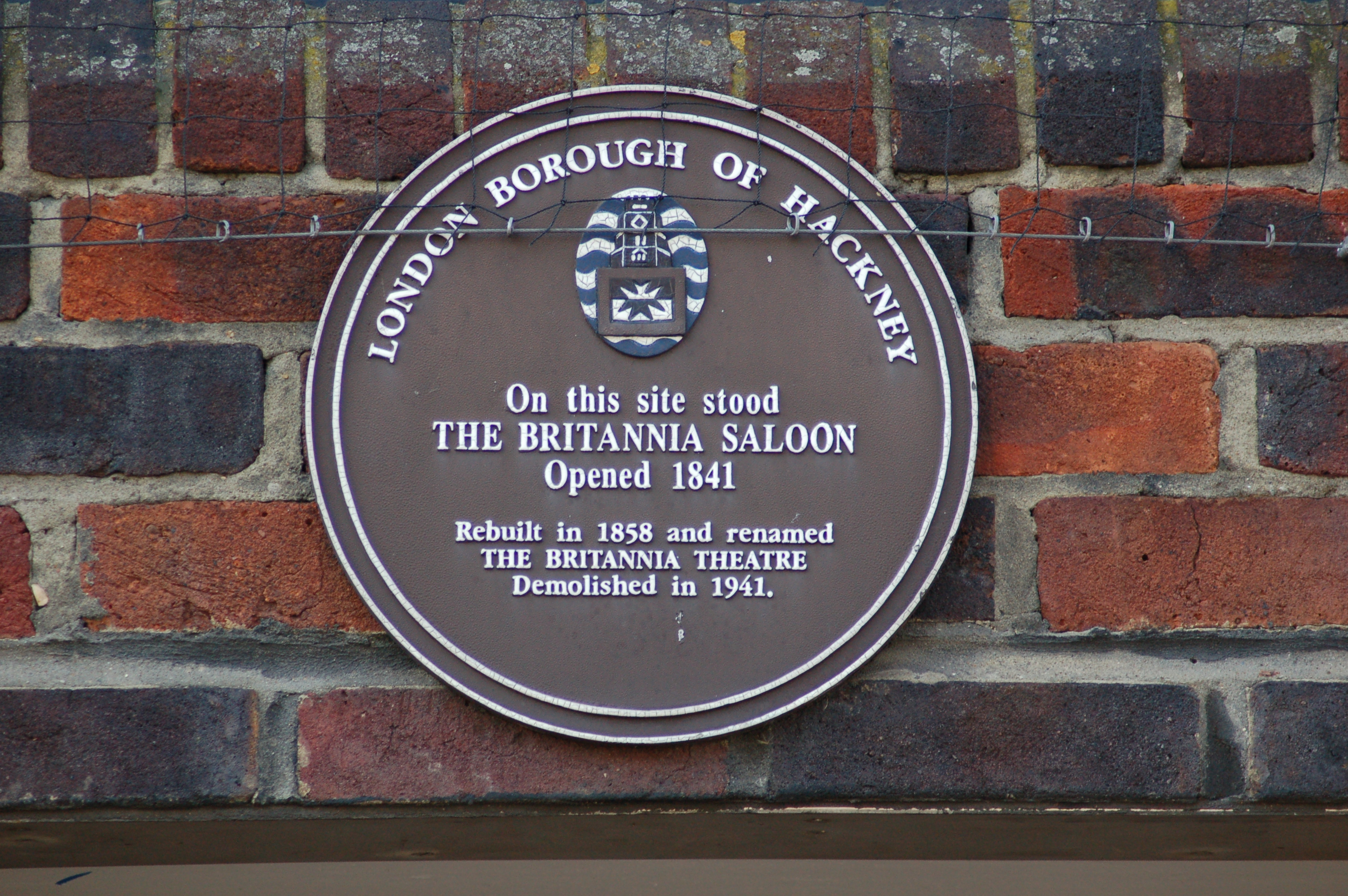
LBH heritage plaque, now attached to modern flats

The Britannia Theatre was unique amongst theatres of the time, for a number of reasons. Entry to the entertainment was always cheap, the income was made from sales of food and drink. There was an extraordinary continuity of management, the theatre was in the hands of the same family throughout its lifetime. The theatre also nurtured talent, many of the regular artistes were taken on at an early stage in their careers and remained with the theatre until retirement. The theatre prospered with the increasing free time and prosperity of its audience, and declined with the introduction of the cinema and later, radio.

Author and critic Compton Mackenzie summed up the enduring legacy of the Britannia, in Echoes (1954):

If I were asked to name the audience that expressed beyond any other the spirit of London I would say the Britannia Theatre, Hoxton, at a pantomime. This was the apotheosis of the Cockney. This was the incarnation of his humour and gaiety and warm humanity. The women in their plumed hats! The costers in their pearlies! The oranges and nuts! That immense audience would seethe with enjoyment: it was a vast bubbling kettle of mirth. This was the stuff out of which came the London able to 'take it' forty years on. I used to have tears in my eyes just from the pleasure of being one in such a gathering. The man who was never one of an audience at the Britannia, Hoxton, has missed something in the life of London.

The Britannia Theatre was the subject of a 1933 novel Sam and Sallie: A novel of the theatre by Alfred L. Crauford. The Craufords had a long association with the Britannia, and Alfred was one of Sarah Lane's many nephews.

In Sarah Waters' 1998 novel Tipping the Velvet, her lead characters are engaged to play pantomime in the theatre.

The venue is mentioned in Chas and Dave's song "Harry was a Champion", describing performer Harry Champion as "king of 'em all at the music hall or down at the Old Britannia".

== Notable performers ==
- Dan Leno actor and comedian
- Lupino Lane (actor and film director, actually great-nephew of Sarah Lane)
- Vesta Tilley (male impersonator)
- Arthur Lloyd (Scottish singer, songwriter, comedian)
- Joseph Reynolds (actor)
- George Barnes Bigwood (Resident low comedian, and occasional stage manager)
- James Anderson, a renowned Shakespearian actor of the time, was engaged at a salary of £180 a week in 1851.

== Sources ==
- Brandreth, Gyles (1977). The Funniest Man on Earth: The Story of Dan Leno. London: Hamish Hamilton. ISBN 978-0-241-89810-9.
