= Edward Louis Paraire =

British architect

- Born: 1826
- Died: 1 August 1882 aged 56; London
- Occupation: Architect
- Known for: Theatres, music halls and public houses
- Notable work: Museum Tavern

Edward Louis Paraire (1826–1882) was a British theatre and music hall architect of the Victorian era.

== Career ==
=== Partnership with Finch Hill ===
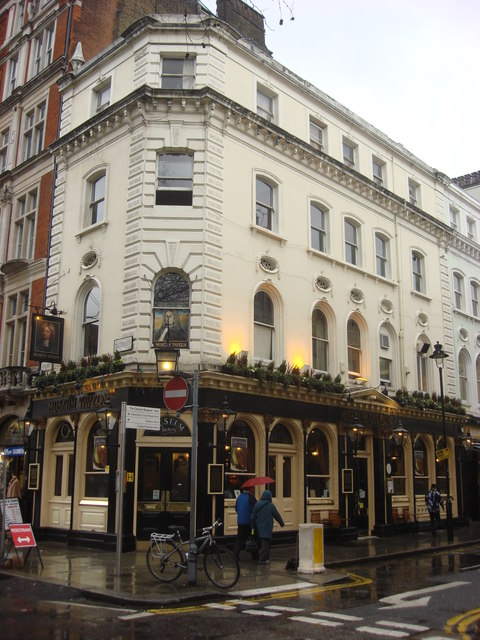
Museum Tavern, London, designed by Finch Hill and Paraire

Between 1856–70, Paraire worked with his partner Finch Hill. Together they worked on many music halls and theatres, including Weston's Music Hall (1857), the Islington Philharmonic (1860), the Oxford Music Hall (1861), the Royal Cambridge (1856, in Shoreditch), and the Britannia Theatre (1841, Hoxton) – the last of whose designs was exhibited by Paraire in 1859.

=== Solo work ===
The partnership was based in separate houses in the same street, and on its dissolution Paraire returned to designing banks, churches and public houses.

The Museum Tavern, a public house, is a Grade II listed buildings.

== Death ==
Paraire died on 1 August 1882 at 36 Mornington Crescent, Regents Park, London, aged 56 years.
