= Alfred Vance =

English singer

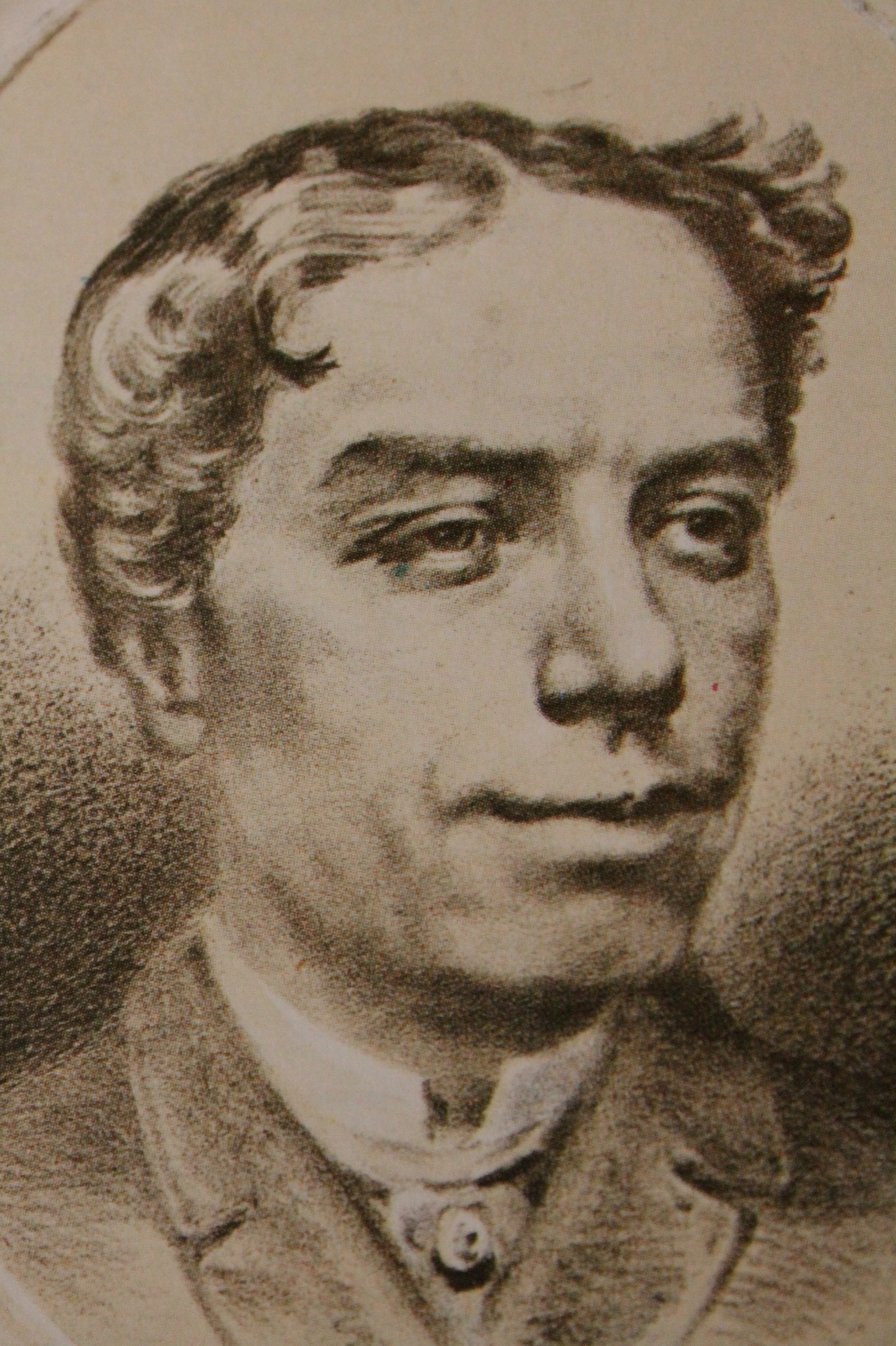
- Alfred Vance
- Born: Alfred Peck Stevens; 1839; London, England
- Died: 26 December 1888 (aged 48–49); Sun Music Hall, Knightsbridge, London
- Other names: The Great Vance; Alfred Glanville Vance
- Occupations: Music hall singer, entertainer

Alfred Glanville Vance (born Alfred Peck Stevens; 1839 – 26 December 1888), often known as The Great Vance, was an English music hall singer, regarded as "one of the most important of the early music-hall performers".

== Biography ==
Vance was born in London in 1839. He worked initially as a solicitor's clerk before appearing in music halls as an actor, and worked under Edmund Falconer in Preston, Lancashire. In the late 1850s he ran a dancing school in Liverpool, and possibly one in Carlisle. He then toured provincial theatres with his own one-man show, featuring his acting, singing and dancing. "He played up to 20 parts at each performance, equally at ease in male or female roles."

He first appeared on stage in London in 1859, and the following year made his first music hall appearance, as part of a blackface act with his brother. His first solo appearance – not in blackface – was at the South London Palace in 1864. He quickly became popular singing cockney songs in character, such as "The Chickaleery Cove", although it was said of him that he was a better dancer than singer.

He developed a new style of music hall performance as a "heavy swell" or Lion comique, at the same time as George Leybourne took a similar approach. In this style, performers relied less on copying burlesque, and instead sought inspiration in their everyday experiences and the colourful characters of daily street life. Audiences loved to join in the chorus and "give the bird". Vance and Leybourne developed a strong rivalry, with Vance's song "Walking in the Zoo" answered by Leybourne with "Lounging in the Aq"; and Leybourne's "Champagne Charlie" answered by Vance with the song "Clicquot". "Walking in the Zoo" has been cited by Desmond Morris as the earliest known use in the UK of the term "O.K." in its current sense; the chorus of Vance's song begins with the line "Walking in the zoo is the O.K. thing to do." It is also one of the first uses of the term "zoo" in place of the full name of "zoological garden". The song refers specifically to the Zoological Gardens at Regent's Park, London.

Vance became a personal favourite of the Prince of Wales. His popularity continued after the demise of the Lion comique fashion, and he performed more "motto songs" in the style of Harry Clifton, and comic songs in character. These included "Come to Your Martha", a relatively bawdy sketch of a bathing machine attendant. He toured with his own concert party, an approach developed by another contemporary rival, Arthur Lloyd.

== Death ==
Vance suffered from heart disease, and died on 26 December 1888, at the age of about 49, while performing on the stage of the Sun Music Hall, Knightsbridge. He is buried in Nunhead Cemetery, although his headstone no longer exists.

== Critical reception ==
Vance toured Cornwall in 1880. Writing in The Cornishman newspaper (14 October 1880), a reporter described him as a broad, not to say vulgar singer who should not be allowed to dispense to the people such songs as the London Music Halls encourage; and suggested that, "The feelings of well-disposed and peaceful citizens are outraged by the so-called improvised songs or topical allusions of this very low comedian. Respectable people are held up to ridicule." The writer further suggested that if Vance should choose to tour Cornwall again, the citizens of Falmouth should follow the example of Redruth and Liskeard, and make his visit a far from pleasant one.

== Songs ==
- "The Brokin 'arted Butler"
- "The Chickaleery Cove"
- "Carrie"
- "A Country Life for Me"
- "Covent Garden in the Morning"
- "Dick Murphy of T.C.D."
- "Fair Girl Dress'd in Check"
- "The Husband's Boat"
- "The Kerrect Kard"
- "Jolly Dogs"
- "Walking in the Zoo"
- "Clicquot"
- "Act on the Square, Boys"
- "The Young Man of the Day"
- "The Naughty Young Man"
- "Old Brown's Daughter"
- "Peter Potts the Peeler"
- "Serjeant Sharp of Lincoln's Inn"
- "Slap Bang Here We Are Again"
- "The Style"
- "Tick! Tick! Tick!"
- "The 'Ticket-of-Leave' Man"
- "Toothpick and Crutch"

== In popular culture ==
- Vance makes a cameo appearance in the novel Lestrade and the Brother of Death by M. J. Trow.
- Vance is played by Stanley Holloway in the 1944 Ealing comedy film Champagne Charlie, opposite Tommy Trinder as George Leybourne and Betty Warren as Bessie Bellwood.
