= Sarah Lane (theatre manager) =

English actress, playwright and theatre manager

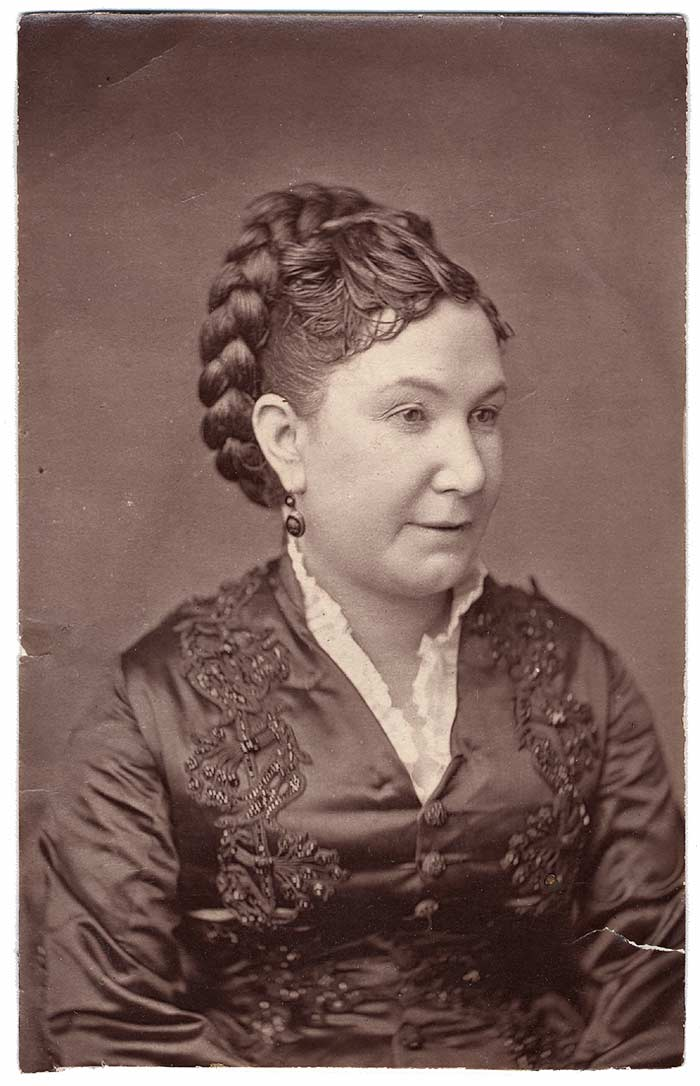
- Born: Sarah Borrow; 22 September 1822; London, England
- Died: 16 August 1899 (aged 76); London, England
- Resting place: Kensal Green Cemetery
- Occupations: Theatre manager, actress
- Spouse: Sam Lane
- Writing career
- Genre: plays

Sarah "Sallie" Lane (22 September 1822 – 16 August 1899) was an English actress, playwright and theatre manager. She was known as "The Queen of Hoxton".

== Biography ==
The daughter of William Borrow and Sarah Fowles, she was born Sarah Borrow in Clerkenwell, London on 22 September 1822. She began performing as a singer and dancer at the age of seventeen under the stage name Sarah Wilton.

In 1843, she married Sam Lane, the manager of the Britannia Theatre. From 1873 to 1881, she wrote or translated from French eight melodramas that were presented at the theatre, including The Faithless Wife and Bad Josephine. Lane presented the works of at least six women playwrights, including Melinda Young. She also took on the role of principal boy in the theatre's productions.

Following her husband's death in 1872, Lane managed the theatre until her own death at her home on Finchley Road on 16 August 1899. During the 1880s and 1890s, she regularly appeared in the theatre's pantomimes.

She was buried at Kensal Green Cemetery.

Sara Lane Court, a block of flats in Hoxton, is named after her.
