= Canterbury Music Hall =

Music hall in London, England

- Canterbury Hall; Canterbury Palace of Varieties; Canterbury Theatre; Canterbury Theatre of Varieties
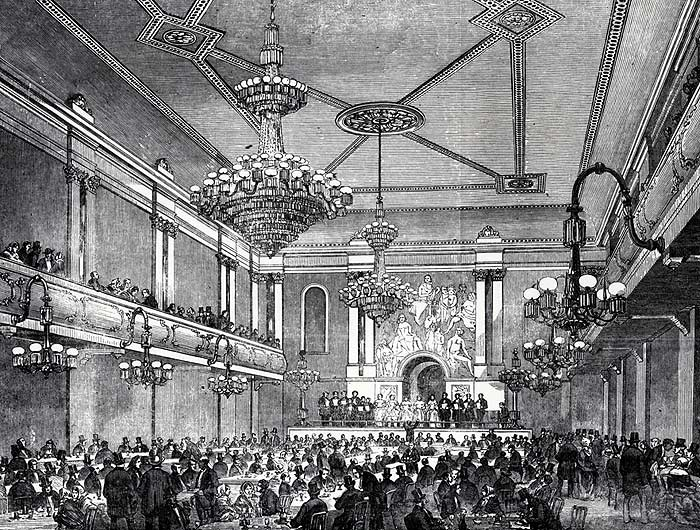
- Interior of the Canterbury Hall, shown in a print of 1856
- Interactive map of Canterbury Music Hall
- Address: 143 Westminster Bridge Road; Lambeth, London
- Coordinates: 51.4991°N 0.1134°W
- Owner: Charles Morton
- Capacity: 1852 700 seated 1854 1,500
- Type: Music hall
- Designation: Demolished

Construction
- Opened: 17 May 1852
- Closed: 1942 (bomb damaged)
- Rebuilt: 1852, 1854, 1858 Samuel Field; 1876 E. Bridgeman; 1890 Frank Matcham; 1902 Wylson and Long

The Canterbury Music Hall was established in 1852 by Charles Morton on the site of a former skittle alley adjacent to the Canterbury Tavern at 143 Westminster Bridge Road, Lambeth. It was one of the first purpose-built music halls in London, and "probably the largest and grandest concert-room ever attached to a public house" in London. Morton came to be dubbed the Father of the Halls as hundreds of imitators were built within the next several years. The theatre was rebuilt three times, and the last theatre on the site was destroyed by bombing in 1942.

== History ==
=== Establishing the hall ===
Morton and Frederick Stanley, his brother in law, purchased the Canterbury Arms, in Upper Marsh, Lambeth, in 1849. Morton was experienced in presenting 'Gentlemen Only' entertainments in his other pubs, and he had been impressed with the entertainments at Evans Music-and-Supper Rooms in Covent Garden and decided to offer a harmonic meeting, held on Saturdays, in the back room of the public house. He brought in smart tables, with candlesticks, allowing audiences to sit and eat comfortably while watching concerts known as 'Sing-Songs' or 'Free and Easys' on Mondays and Saturdays. Soon, a Thursday evening programme was added to accommodate the crowds. Morton encouraged women to attend the entertainments, giving the venue wider appeal than the old time song and supper rooms, which were male preserves. Entry was free, but the profits from the sale of food and drink allowed the construction of a larger hall on the site of the former skittle alley, at the back of the public house.

This 700–seat hall took a year to build and opened as the Canterbury Hall on 17 May 1852, described as "the most significant date in all the history of music hall". The hall charged a modest admission and looked like most contemporary concert rooms within public houses of the period. It specialised in programmes of light music and ballads. Professional performers could earn high fees, and this attracted performances of selections from opera, including the first performances of Jacques Offenbach's music in England.

=== First purpose-built tavern music hall ===
The venture was profitable, and a new theatre was built in 1856, of unprecedented size, seating 1,500. In order not to interrupt the flow of profits, the theatre was constructed around the walls of the 1852 hall, and when it was complete, the old building within was demolished in a single weekend. This new theatre was the first purpose-built tavern music hall and opened in December 1856, as the New Canterbury Hall.

The building had a grand entrance with extensive windows and a glazed roof that could be withdrawn to let the cigar and pipe smoke out. The bar was installed on a balcony over the hall, reached by ascending a grand staircase. The fittings were luxurious, with chandeliers and painted walls. At the end of the main hall there was a simple stage with a grand piano and harmonium to provide entertainment between the acts. The 'chairman' sat on the stage, introduced the acts, provided his own 'patter' and exhorted the patrons to drink. The entrance fee was 6 pence downstairs, and 9 pence upstairs. Customers sat at small tables, and waiters brought food and drink to them. The 1859 expansion of the viaducts carrying trains to Waterloo railway station separated the theatre entrance from the auditorium, and patrons entered through a long arched tunnel under the railway, entertained by an aquarium. In 1861, Blondin walked a tightrope fixed between the balconies of the hall.

Their success at the Canterbury allowed Stanley and Morton to build The Oxford, in Holborn, as a competitor to the nearby Weston's Music Hall, opening on 26 March 1861. The pair managed both halls, with acts moving between the halls in coaches.

On Boxing Night 1867, William Holland took over management of the Canterbury and refurbished the hall at considerable cost. When informed that his purchase of a 1,000 Guinea carpet was too good for his clientele, he invited them "to come in and spit on it". Further popularity accrued to the venue when classical music was removed from the bill and George Leybourne was engaged at £20 a week as lion comique. Leybourne remained top of the bill for some twenty years, before succumbing to the effects of the champagne he promoted here under the guise of "Champagne Charlie".

=== Enlarged theatre ===
1893 programme cover

R. E. Villiers took over the management in 1876 and spent £40,000 to enlarge the theatre. He reintroduced a popular ballet item featuring the dancers Phyllis Broughton and Florence Powell. Topical ballets, such as Plevna and Trafalgar (both by the Belgian choreographer Henri Leopold De Winne), drew in the crowds, including the Prince of Wales. In 1877, the Queen's theatre in Long Acre and the Canterbury were joined by overhead wires, and public demonstrations of the Cromwell Varley telephone were given. Several simple tunes were transmitted and emitted softly from a large drum-like apparatus suspended over the proscenium. Robert W. Paul's Theatrograph was used at the theatre from 27 April 1896, a year after it had first been demonstrated at the Alhambra in Leicester Square. The film programme included Boxers and Lady Gymnast. These early experiments in films were only a partial success.

In his autobiography, former Lambeth resident Charlie Chaplin recalls seeing his father, Charles Chaplin Senior, performing at the Canterbury. Later Chaplin, himself, played there.

The hall was rebuilt as the 3,000–seat Canterbury Theatre of Varieties in 1890 by Frank Matcham; and alterations were made in 1902. By 1915, this theatre came to be used as a cinema and was extensively damaged by bombing in 1942. The remains were finally demolished in 1955.
