= Wal Pink =

English music hall performer

Walter Augustus Pink (10 May 1862—27 October 1922) was an English music hall performer, writer and theatre producer.

Wal Pink was born in Paddington, London, and started his career as a singer in smoking concerts, before appearing on the music hall stage. He became a popular performer, as well as a lyricist of songs and monologues for other performers. His usual co-writers included Frank Aylmer and George Le Brunn, and he wrote for such artists as Charles Godfrey ("The Seventh Royal Fusiliers", written with Le Brunn, 1891), James Fawn, Vesta Tilley, Harry Tate, and Marie Lloyd.

He was one of the founding members of the Grand Order of Water Rats charitable organization in 1889, became its first Secretary ("Scribe Rat") and was responsible for writing the group's governing principles, as well as their theme song. There are conflicting accounts of the reason for adopting the name "Water Rats"; according to Wee Georgie Wood it was adopted at Pink's suggestion, "rats" being a reversal of the word "star". Pink was also involved in setting up the Variety Artistes Federation, with Joe O'Gorman and others.

Pink became well known for writing comedy sketches and pantomimes, and for writing and producing theatrical revues, particularly at the Hippodrome in London. He was a member of the organising committee for the first Royal Variety Performance, in 1912, afterwards commenting that "the music hall has come into its kingdom".

His death came after he had driven from London to Sheffield, in order to see a production of Smoke Rings, a revue which he had written for Albert de Courville. On the journey, he contracted a chill, which resulted in double pneumonia; he was aged 60.
