= J. P. Harrington (lyricist) =

English lyricist of music hall songs and writer

- Born: May 1, 1865
- Origin: England
- Died: August 19, 1939 (aged 74)
- Occupations: Lyricist of music hall songs, and Writer.

John Patrick Harrington (1 May 1865 – 19 August 1939) was an English lyricist of music hall songs, and writer.

He was born in Holborn, London, and started work at the age of 12 as an assistant to songwriter Joseph Tabrar, who tutored him as a lyricist. He attempted to go it alone, writing music as well as lyrics, but had little success as a songwriter until he joined forces with composer George Le Brunn in about 1885. They worked together in partnership for some twenty years, until Le Brunn's early death in 1905, writing such songs as "The Seven Ages of Man" (sung by Charles Godfrey, 1888) and "Ev'rything In The Garden's Lovely!" (1894; popularised by Marie Lloyd). Harrington also worked as a writer on popular magazines such as Funny Folks.

He became a partner of James W. Tate in a theatrical agency, and moved into publishing, writing numerous music hall sketches and monologues for popular music hall performers of the day, including Marie Lloyd and Vesta Tilley. He also continued to write songs, such as "I Know Where the Flies Go (On a Cold and Frosty Morning)", written with Sam Mayo in 1920. He is said to have written over one thousand published songs. He became relatively prosperous, moving to a house in Bedford which he named Lyric Lodge, while travelling to London each day by train in morning coat and top hat. However, in his later years the popularity of his songs had largely evaporated, the music halls had vanished, and he was obliged to move back to rented rooms. He died in Barnet in 1939, aged 74.
