= Joe O'Gorman (senior) =

Irish-born comedian

- Born: Joseph O'Gorman; 24 May 1863; Dublin, Ireland
- Died: 1 August 1937 (aged 74); Barnes, Surrey, England
- Occupation(s): Comedian, singer, dancer, organiser

Joseph O'Gorman (24 May 1863–1 August 1937) was an Irish-born comedian. He formed a popular and innovative double act in British music halls with Joe Tennyson, Tennyson and O'Gorman, in the 1880s and 1890s, before becoming a solo performer. He was also an organiser of theatrical artistes, and was the father of Joe and Dave O'Gorman, "The O'Gorman Brothers".

== Life and career ==
He was born in Dublin, developed skills as a dancer and singer, and came to England in 1879. He formed a duo with Horace Wheatley, and then, from 1881, with Joseph Tennyson (born in Manchester, 12 July 1861–5 September 1926). As Tennyson and O'Gorman, they became one of the leading music hall acts in Britain, developing the idea of cross-talking. Earlier minstrel acts had used the idea of "Mr Interlocutor" bantering with the other performers, but Tennyson and O'Gorman had both performers at centre stage, Tennyson as the comic and O'Gorman as the foil.

They wore top hats and frock coats and were often billed as "The Two Irish Gentlemen", countering the racist idea that the Irish were all roughly-dressed and ignorant. As well as performing comic sketches, they sang and danced as a duo, and were also known as "The Patter Propagators". Their most successful song, "The Wild Man of Poplar (A Very Pop'lar Ditty)", was a cumulative tale starting with "The Wild Man of Poplar has just come to town" and continuing through ten permutations ("the wife of the Wild Man.....", "the child of the wife of the Wild Man...", etc.). Tennyson and O'Gorman peaked in popularity in the early 1890s. They toured extensively, including several visits to the United States, Canada and Australia, before ending their partnership in 1901. Tennyson later performed in a double act with William Wallis, and from 1915 worked as a solo act.

O'Gorman became a solo performer, and was also actively involved in the organisation of music hall performers. He was a founder member of the charitable organization, the Grand Order of Water Rats. He was elected King Rat in both 1898 and 1901, and was later Chief Booker of the Water Rats. With the growth of the music hall and theatre circuit in Britain, and the need to protect performers against undue exploitation by theatre agents and owners, O'Gorman was involved, with Wal Pink and others, in establishing the Variety Artistes' Federation, becoming the first chairman of the trade union. He led the performers in the Music Hall Strike of 1907, which resulted in important legal victories, but this in turn led to him finding work hard to get as agents and theatre owners turned against him. O'Gorman was also involved, with Joe Elvin, in setting up Brinsworth House in Twickenham, a care home for retired entertainers which opened in 1911.

In 1914, he teamed up again with Wal Pink and Harry Tate to form TOP Productions. Their first revue, Irish and Proud of it, was based around O'Gorman's performances as a comedian, dancer and singer. The show was a success, and was followed by others with a similar approach, As Irish as Ever and Shamrock Time. O'Gorman later retired as a performer, but made a comeback in 1933 with a Veterans' Variety Company.

He was married four times. He married Maggie Coleman in 1887; their two sons, Joe and David, later became a leading comic duo in variety shows as well as radio and films, peaking in popularity between the 1920s and 1940s. Joe and Maggie divorced in 1897; he alleged her misconduct with three named men, while she countered with claims of cruelty and misconduct. Joe then remarried, to Jessie Grace (née Prosser), a slack wire performer known as "The Beautiful Jessica"; she died in 1908. His third marriage, to Irma Berenyi, again ended in divorce, in 1912. In 1923, he married Lily Rose Stone, who outlived him.

Joe O'Gorman died in Barnes, Surrey in 1937, aged 74, and was buried in Putney Vale Cemetery. In 2014, the Music Hall Guild restored his grave.
