= Harry Freeman (music hall performer) =

English entertainer (1858–1922)

- Freeman c. 1890
- Born: 29 July 1858; Bromsgrove, Birmingham, England
- Died: 30 July 1922 (aged 64); St Peter's Hospital Covent Garden
- Occupation: Entertainer
- Movement: Grand Order of Water Rats

Harry Freeman (29 July 1858 – 30 July 1922) was an English music hall performer of the Victorian era and early twentieth century, and the first King Rat of the show business charity the Grand Order of Water Rats. Among his popular songs were 'Leicester Square' and 'The Giddy little Girl said, "No!"'

Sheet music cover of Freeman's 'They Were All Occupied' (1898)

Freeman was born near Bromsgrove in Worcestershire in 1858. In his early teens he moved to Birmingham where he was mainly to be based as an entertainer until his death. His first public appearance was aged 19 in 1877 at a 'Free and Easy' at the Imperial Theatre in Walsall. This was such a success that he received bookings at all the main music halls in the Midlands. He made his London debut at 'Lusby's Music Hall' in 1881. Freeman became a popular entertainer in the music halls of London and the provinces, but he never gained the fame or success in these that he held in his native Birmingham. His songs included 'Can't Stop', 'They're After Me', 'It Never Troubles Me', 'The Giddy little Girl said, "No!"', 'They Were All Occupied' and 'Leicester Square'. A popular success was the song 'Wot Cher Trilby', written by Cart Howard following the success of the stage play Trilby, and which Freeman sang dressed in female attire.

During the early 1890s Freeman was living in London, and when the Grand Order of Water Rats was formed in 1890 by Joe Elvin and Jack Lotto, music hall star Dan Leno was to have been the first King Rat of the order, but he preferred not to be King for the first year, and the office went instead to Freeman. In 1896 he appeared on the bill at 'The Paragon Theatre of Varieties' on the Mile End Road in London's East End.

Freeman was one of the 231 figures depicted in Walter Lambert's 'Popularity', a vast painting depicting the music hall stars of the early 1900s. His last public appearance was in Norwich in May 1922.

Harry Freeman died on 30 July 1922 following an abdominal operation in St Peter's Hospital in Covent Garden. He was buried in St Mary's Church, Handsworth in his native Birmingham on 4 August 1922.
