= Martinetti =

Martinetti is a surname. Notable people with this surname include:

- Angelo Martinetti (1830–date of death unknown), Italian painter, mainly of still-lives depicting game
- Daniele Martinetti (born 1981) is an Italian footballer
- David Martinetti (born 1970), Swiss wrestler
- Étienne Martinetti (1940–2002), Swiss wrestler
- Grégory Martinetti (born 1972), Swiss wrestler
- Jimmy Martinetti (born 1946), Swiss former wrestler
- León Martinetti (1926–1999), Argentine basketball player
- Maria Martinetti (1864–1921), Italian painter
- Nella Martinetti (1946–2011), Swiss singer-songwriter
- Nicolas Martinetti (born 1989), French professional football player
- Paul Martinetti (1846–1924), French-American pantomimist and entertainer, who settled in Britain
- Piero Martinetti (1872–1943), Italian philosopher
- Raphaël Martinetti, Swiss President of the International Federation of Associated Wrestling Styles

In fiction

- Luis Martinetti, Contortionist, a 1894 short film produced by the Edison Manufacturing Company

== See also ==
- Martinelli
