= Joe O'Gorman =

English cricketer and entertainer (1890–1974)

Personal information
- Full name: Joseph George O'Gorman
- Born: 24 July 1890; Walworth, London, England
- Died: 26 August 1974 (aged 84); Weybridge, Surrey, England
- Batting: Right-handed
- Bowling: Right-arm legbreak
- Role: Bowler

Domestic team information
- Years: Team
- 1927: Surrey
- FC debut: 18 May 1927 Surrey v Glamorgan
- Last FC: 10 June 1927 Surrey v Leicestershire

Career statistics
Competition	First-class
Matches	3
Runs scored	106
Batting average	106.00
100s/50s	0/0
Top score	42*
Balls bowled	384
Wickets	4
Bowling average	41.75
5 wickets in innings	0
10 wickets in match	0
Best bowling	2/49
Catches/stumpings	1/–
- Source: CricketArchive, 9 August 2015

Joseph George O'Gorman (24 July 1890 – 26 August 1974) was a British entertainer and cricketer. With his brother Dave (1894–1964) he formed a song, dance and comedy act called the O'Gorman Brothers. Starting by touring the variety halls of England, in the 1930s they also became popular in the United States and earned a fortune.

== The entertainer ==
In becoming entertainers, the two brothers were following in the footsteps of their father, also called Joe O'Gorman (1863–1937). He was an Irishman who moved to England in 1879, where he had considerable success as a comedian. In both 1898 and 1901 he was elected King Rat of the Grand Order of Water Rats and he was also the first chairman of the newly formed Variety Artistes' Federation. He had a double act with Joe Tennyson; they were known as The Two Irish Gentlemen or The Patter Propagators.

In 1907 Joe and Dave began appearing as the O'Gorman Brothers, their act including acrobatic dancing, singing and comedy. They had considerable success, and toured South Africa in 1913 and visited Berlin, Vienna and Budapest the following year. Eventually the format settled into that of a comedy double act. They toured their own shows Round the Town, Finnegan’s Follies and Fools in Paradise. In the 1920s they became noted for the so-called "Crazy" style of comedy. They frequently appeared at the Holborn Empire and toured their London Palladium shows.

They toured the United States in 1931 and 1932 for Paramount and RKO. From this time their act was renamed "Dave and Joe O’Gorman", in accordance with American convention. Around this time they made their first appearance in pantomime, and quickly became recognised as masters of the form. In 1936 they appeared in the film Variety Parade.

During World War II they made broadcasts on BBC radio, and toured in shows that included The Boys of the BBC and Hello Playmates with Arthur Askey. During this time they developed a very popular comedy ventriloquist routine. They also did much work entertaining the troops with ENSA, this including visiting Italy, India and Burma.

They appeared in the 1946 Royal Variety Show and continued to appear in variety and pantomime. In 1948 they were chosen to lead a British version of the American show Hellzapoppin, which following initial performances in London toured the country. Their final tour was in 1954 with the Victoria Palace show Knights of Madness.

In 1956 Dave followed his father in being elected King Rat. He died eight years later.

== The cricketer ==
Both brothers were keen amateur cricketers, playing for clubs including Honor Oak and Richmond. In club cricket Joe took over 1.500 wickets. Both brothers also played for the Surrey second eleven, where Joe in particular was very successful. As a result, in May 1927 he was selected to play two games at The Oval for the Surrey first team, making his debut at the relatively late age of 36. A leg-spinner described as having a "great repertoire of deliveries", he took four wickets, including one with his first ball in first-class cricket. Batting at number nine, he had three not out scores of 31, 20 and 42. His variety commitments meant that he was unable to play in the next - away - match. He made only one further appearance for the first team, the following month, when he was out for 13. This left him with the freakishly high career first-class batting average of 106.

His grandson Tim O'Gorman also played first-class cricket.
