= Bandon Hill Cemetery =

Cemetery in London

Coordinates: 51°21′54″N 0°8′5″W

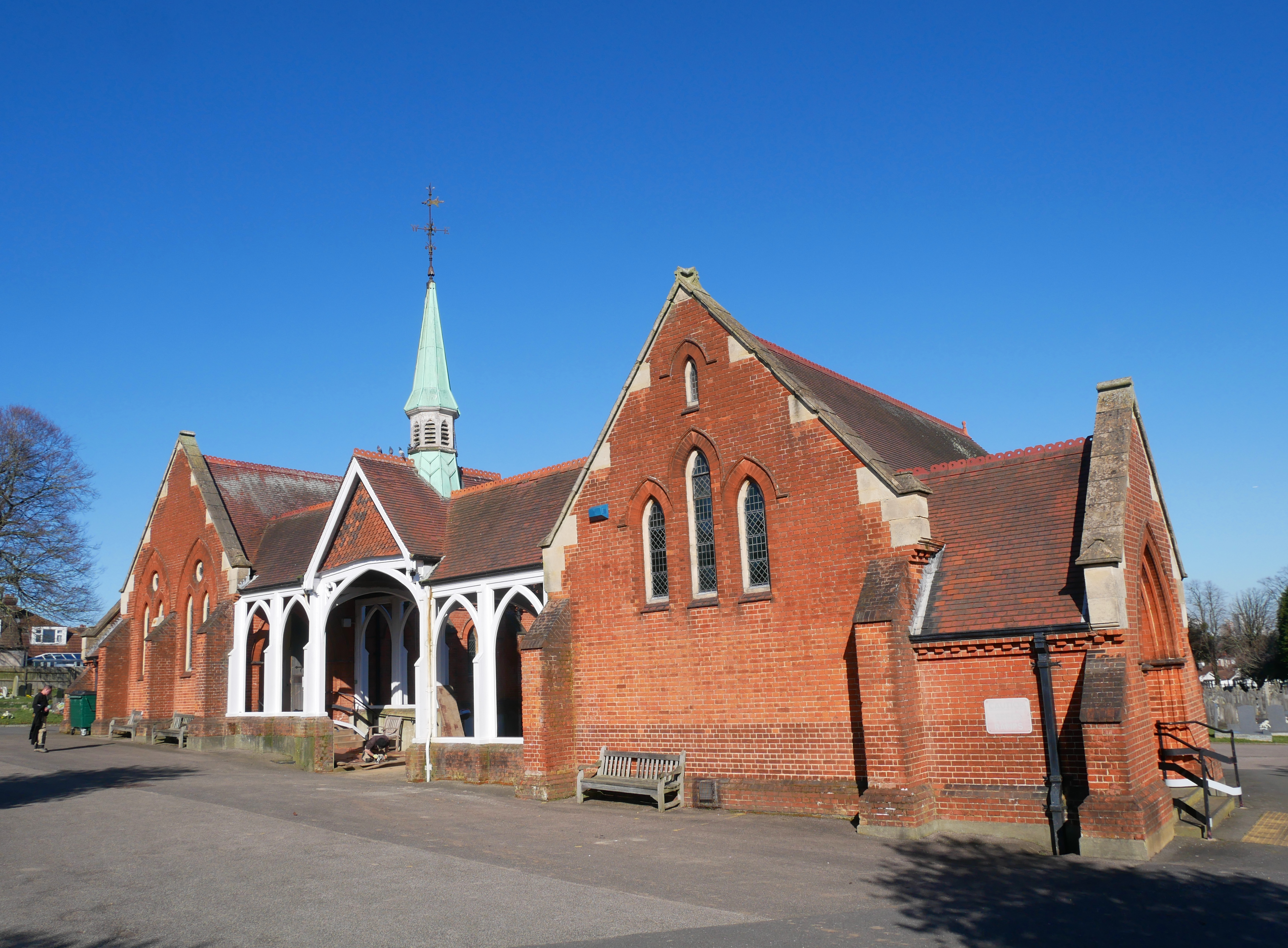
The chapel at Bandon Hill Cemetery

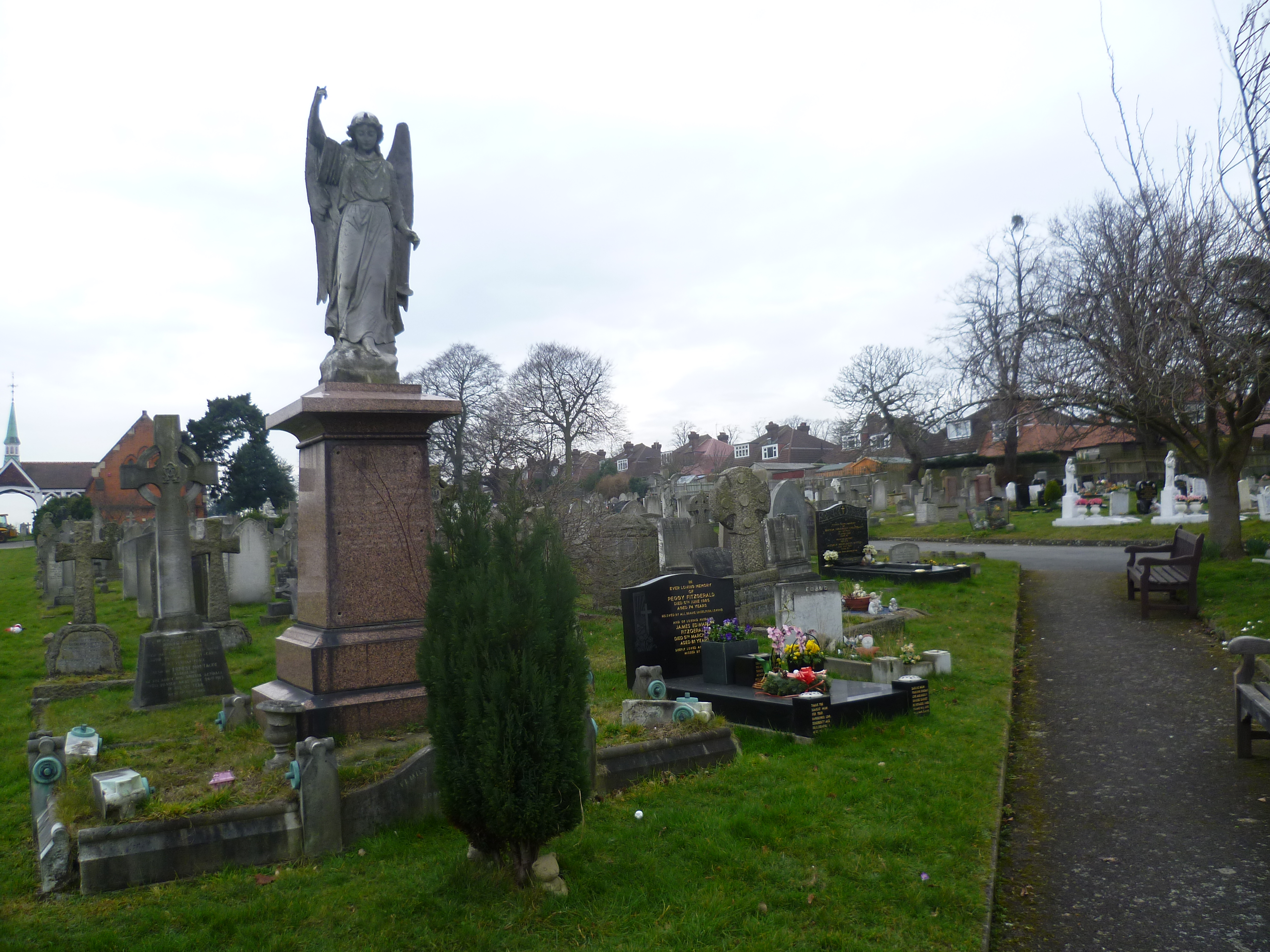
The cemetery

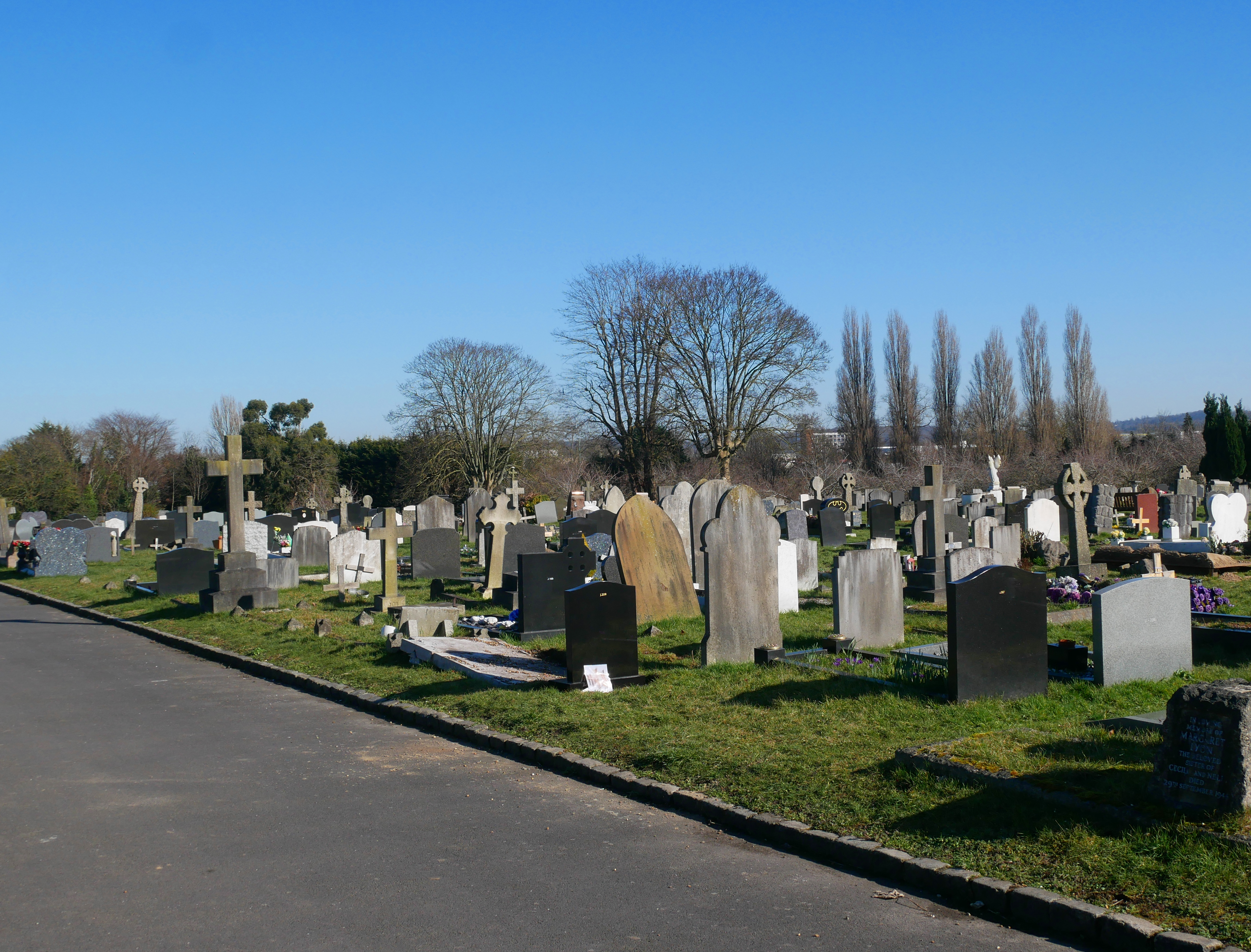
Southeast-facing view across the graves

Bandon Hill Cemetery is a cemetery in Wallington, south-west London. While it was founded in 1900 by the Croydon Rural District Council, it is actually located in the London Borough of Sutton and upon the formation of London Boroughs in 1965, was jointly run by the London Boroughs of Croydon and Sutton. It has an area of about 15 acres, (6¼ hectares) and contains about 14,000 grave spaces.

== History ==
The cemetery's first interment occurred on Wednesday, 7 March 1900. On Friday, 24 March 2006 the cemetery carried out its 30,000th interment.

== Notable interments ==
- Samuel Coleridge-Taylor, English composer who achieved such success that he was once called the "African Mahler"
- Eugene Stratton, American-born dancer and singer, whose career was mostly spent in British music halls
- Joe Elvin, Cockney comedian and music hall entertainer and a Founder of the Grand Order of Water Rats, a show business charity
- Jack Lotto, music hall performer of the late Victorian and Edwardian eras whose specialty was a trick-cycling act

The Cemetery also contains the war graves of 124 Commonwealth service personnel of both World Wars
