= My London Country Lane =

English song

Song
- Language: English
- Published: 1900
- Genre: Music Hall
- Composer: Albert Perry
- Lyricist: Edgar Bateman

"My London Country Lane" (Roud 32453) is popular cockney song of the early 20th century, written by Edgar Bateman.

== History and description ==
The song's lyrics were written by Edgar Bateman and the music composed by Albert Perry. It was most famously performed by Alec Hurley.

The song describes someone who has recently moved to London from the countryside, and reminisces about his previous home by walking down Drury Lane and imagining it as a country lane, with fresh produce for sale.

== See also ==
- If It Wasn't for the 'Ouses In Between
