= Fred Russell (ventriloquist) =

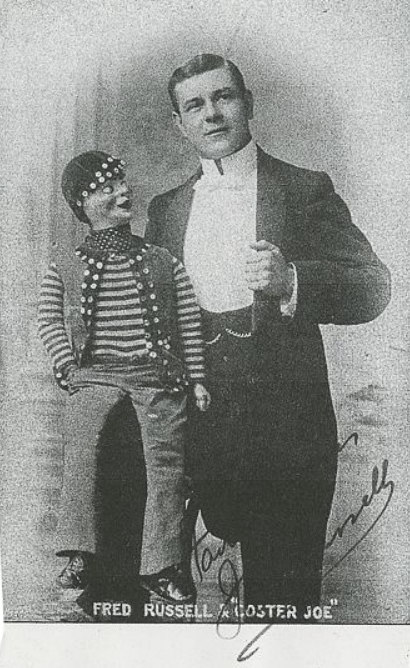
c. 1895

Thomas Frederick Parnell OBE (29 September 1862 – 14 October 1957), known professionally as Fred Russell, was an English ventriloquist. He is known as "The Father of Modern Ventriloquism" because in the 1890s he used only one dummy on stage creating a fast moving comedy team rather than a multi-figure act which, at the time, was the accepted format for a ventriloquial presentation.

== Biography ==
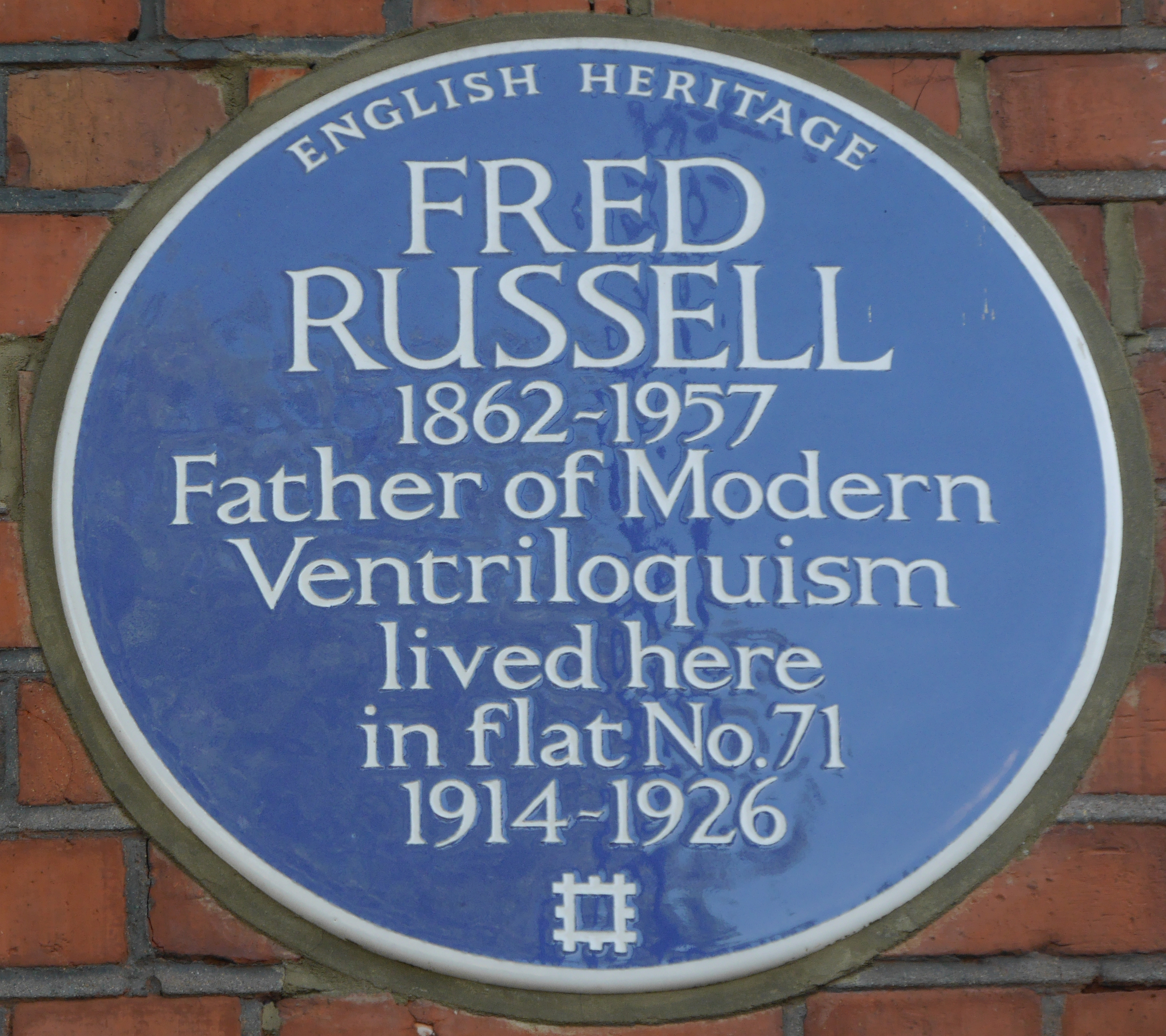
Blue plaque, Putney, London

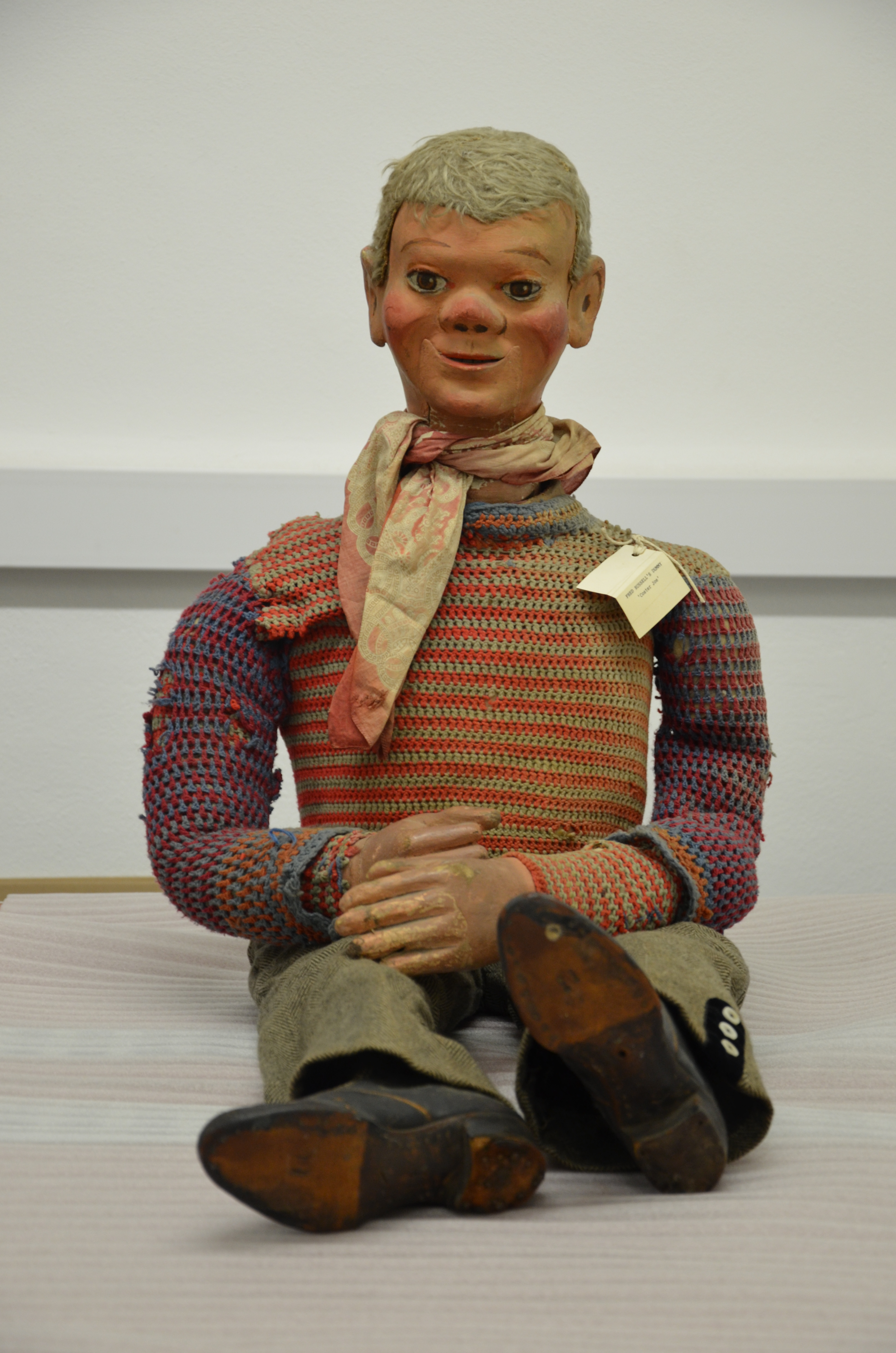
Image of "Coster Joe", held by University of Bristol Theatre Collection.

Russell was born in London, and began his career as a journalist, but from 1882 began performing his hobby of ventriloquism in public. In 1896, when he was editor of the Hackney and Kingsland Gazette, he was offered a professional engagement at London's Palace Theatre and took up his stage career permanently. According to The Times obituary, he changed his name because of the political flavour of "Parnell".

His act, based on the cheeky-boy dummy "Coster Joe", broke from the prevailing format of a family of dummies, establishing a precedent for performers such as Edgar Bergen and Paul Winchell. He remained popular for several decades, involving prolonged tours of Britain, Australia, New Zealand and South Africa, as well as visits to the United States and Ceylon. In 1932, and again in 1952 at the age of 90, he appeared at the Royal Command Performance.

He was active in promoting the variety show genre and was a founder of the Variety Artistes' Federation in 1906 and its chairman in 1908. He was managing director of the VAF's news sheet, The Performer, from 1915 to 1945. In 1910, he published a book on his craft entitled Ventriloquism and Kindred Arts. He was also an early and leading member of the Grand Order of Water Rats charity, and was 'King Rat' on four occasions, in 1903, 1914, 1929 and 1939.

In 1948 he was awarded an OBE for his long services to the profession. He continued to perform late in life, giving televised music hall performances in 1952, billed as "the oldest ventriloquist in the world". He died in Wembley, aged 95.

One of his sons, Val Parnell, became a leading television and theatrical impresario.

== Blue plaque ==
Fred Russell lived in Kenilworth Court in Putney, London, from 1914 to 1926. A blue plaque by the entrance of Kenilworth Court commemorates him.
