= Gavin Ewart =

English poet (1916–1995)

Gavin Ewart FRSL
- Born: Gavin Buchanan Ewart; 4 February 1916; London, England
- Died: 23 October 1995 (aged 79); London, England
- Education: Wellington College; Christ's College, Cambridge
- Occupation: Poet
- Spouse: Margo Bennett (m. 1956)
- Children: 2
- Awards: Cholmondeley Award, 1971; Michael Braude Award for Light Verse, 1991

Gavin Buchanan Ewart FRSL (4 February 1916 – 23 October 1995) was a British poet who contributed to Geoffrey Grigson's New Verse at the age of seventeen.

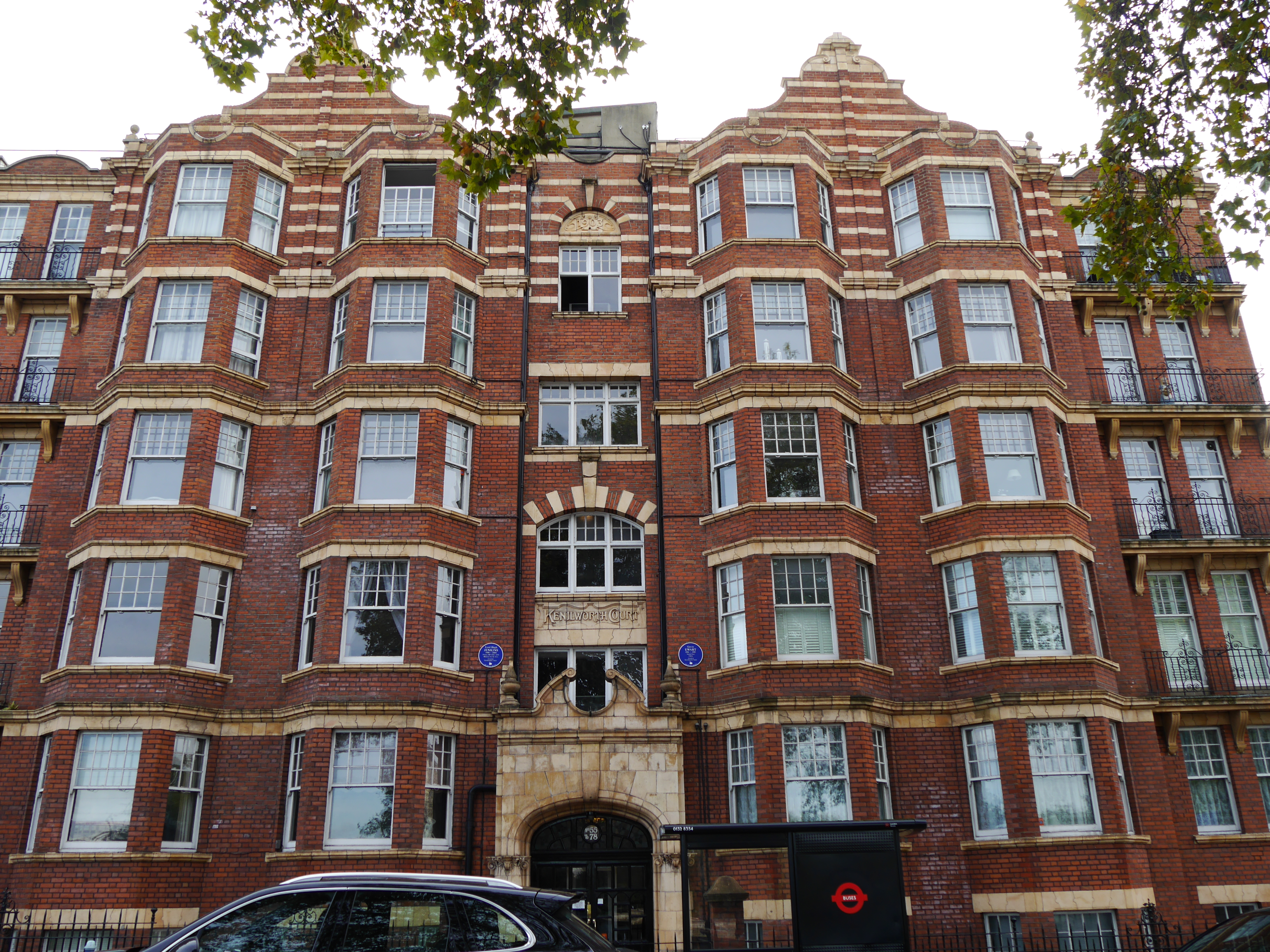
Kenilworth Court, Putney, London

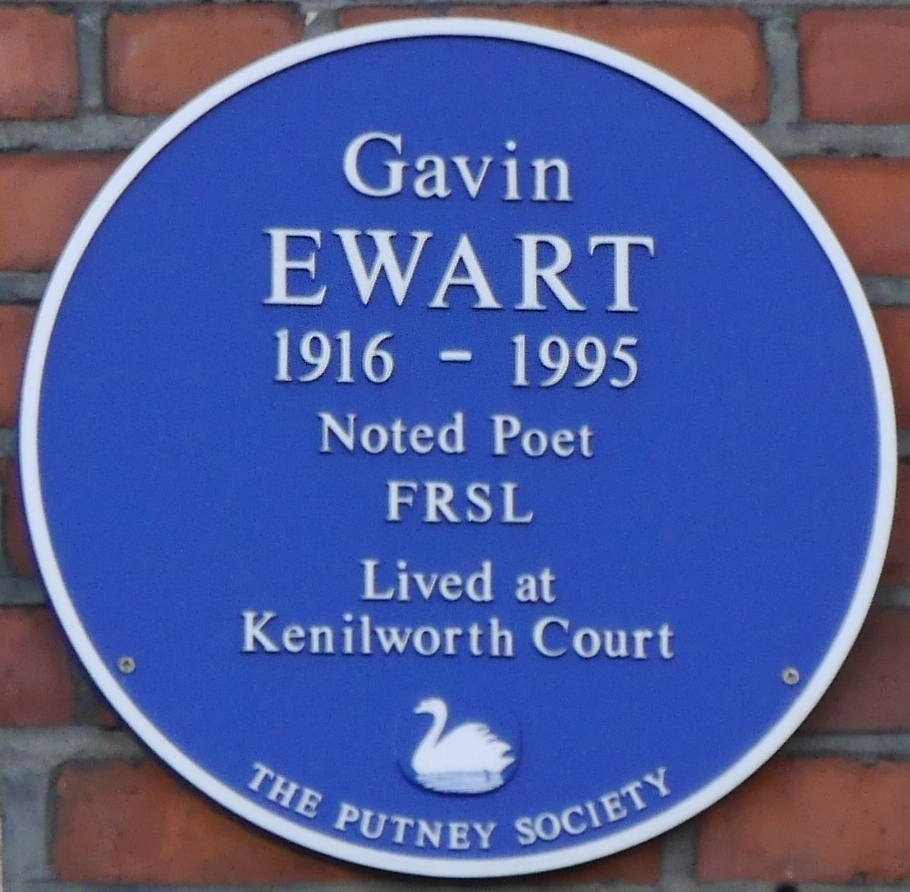
Kenilworth Court blue plaque

== Early life ==
Gavin Ewart was born in London to George and Dorothy (née Turner). His father, a distinguished surgeon at St George's Hospital, came from an intellectually robust lineage; his paternal grandfather, James Cossar Ewart, was a renowned Scottish zoologist. His familial milieu included two younger sisters, Nancy and Jean, born in 1917 and 1920, respectively.

Educated at Wellington College, Ewart progressed to Christ's College, Cambridge, where he received a B.A. in 1937 and an M.A. in 1942. The outbreak of World War II saw him serve as a Royal Artillery officer, a period which inevitably interrupted his poetic endeavours. Post-war, his career meandered through publishing and the British Council, culminating in his role as an advertising copywriter from 1952 onwards. His residence at Kenilworth Court in Putney, London, is commemorated by a blue plaque.

== Poetry ==
Ewart’s poetic journey began under the aegis of Geoffrey Grigson, with his work appearing in New Verse at seventeen. Early collections such as Phallus in Wonderland and Poems and Songs (1939) showcased his wit and lyrical deftness. However, the war years stymied his poetic output, and it wasn’t until Londoners in 1964 that he published another volume. Nevertheless, he contributed the English lyrics for the “World Song” of the World Association of Girl Guides and Girl Scouts during this hiatus.

The post-1964 period was prolific for Ewart. His collections, including The Gavin Ewart Show (1971), No Fool like an Old Fool (1976), All My Little Ones (1978), The Ewart Quarto (1984), The Young Pobble’s Guide to His Toes (1985), and Penultimate Poems (1989), firmly established his reputation. The Collected Ewart: 1933–1980 (1980) and Collected Poems: 1980–1990 (1991) consolidated his oeuvre.

Ewart’s poetry, noted for its irreverent eroticism and sharp commentary on human behaviour, was both entertaining and thought-provoking. This very irreverence led to the banning of The Pleasures of the Flesh (1966) by W.H. Smith. His editorial acumen was evident in anthologies such as The Penguin Book of Light Verse (1980), and his contribution to light verse earned him the Michael Braude Award in 1991.

Ewart’s life and legacy are chronicled in Civil Humor: The Poetry of Gavin Ewart by Stephen W. Delchamps (Fairleigh Dickinson University Press, 2002), a testament to his enduring influence. As an editor, he produced numerous anthologies, including The Penguin Book of Light Verse (1980). He was the 1991 recipient of the Michael Braude Award for Light Verse.

== Personal life and death ==
In 1956, Ewart married Margo Bennett, and they had two children. An atheist, he was actively involved with the British Humanist Association. Ewart died from prostate cancer at Royal Trinity Hospice on 23 October 1995, at the age of 79. Nigel Spivey recalled interviewing Ewart for the Financial Times over a convivial lunch the day before his death, at which 'the main item on the agenda was alcohol, not food'. The following day Spivey received a call from Mrs Ewart: "There are two things you need to know," she said. "The first is that Gavin came home yesterday happier than I have seen him in a long time. The second – and you are not to feel bad about this – is that he died this morning."

== Selected bibliography ==
- 1939: Poems and Songs
- 1964: Londoners. Pleasure of the Flesh
- 1971: The Gavin Ewart Show
- 1976: No Fool like an Old Fool
- 1977: Or Where a Young Penguin Lies Screaming
- 1978: All My Little Ones
- 1980: The Collected Ewart: 1933–1980
- 1984: The Ewart Quarto
- 1985: The Gavin Ewart Show: Selected Poems 1939–1985
- 1985: The Young Pobble's Guide to His Toes
- 1987: Late Pickings
- 1989: Penultimate Poems
- 1991: Collected Poems: 1980–1990

=== As editor ===
- 1980: The Penguin Book of Light Verse

== Honours ==
- Cholmondeley Award, 1971
- Fellow of the Royal Society of Literature (FRSL), 1981
