= Don Smoothey =

British variety performer

- Born: Donald Ralph Smoothey; 11 April 1919; Fulham, London, England
- Died: 17 May 2015 (aged 96); Kingston Upon Thames, London, England
- Other names: Don Maxwell; Chester Ladd
- Occupations: Stage actor, variety entertainer, comic
- Years active: 1932 - 1990

Donald Ralph Smoothey (11 April 1919 – 17 May 2015) was a British stage actor, variety entertainer and comic.

== Career ==
=== Theatre ===
At the age of twelve, Smoothey attended the Italia Conti Academy of Theatre Arts where his brother Len Lowe was already a student, and began his show business career as a child in 1932 appearing at the Holborn Empire in a production of Where the Rainbow Ends. This was followed by a time in the production of Cavalcade at Drury Lane.

Smoothey joined the army at the outbreak of World War II and entertained troops as half of a double act with Len Marten. In 1942, he became a member of the official army organization Stars in Battledress. He left the service in 1946 and returned to civilian life and variety entertainment by appearing at The Grand, Clapham Junction. During this time he used several stage names, including Don Maxwell and Chester Ladd. He completed a long tour in the production of The Old Town Hall, which was followed by Ralph Reader's The Gangs All Here.

=== Variety entertainment ===
In 1950, Smoothey joined his brother Len Lowe as half of a new act called "Lowe and Ladd". They enjoyed success in England, as well as touring in Australia and New Zealand until 1956, when Len wished to turn his own attentions to television and the team parted. From that point Smoothey used his own name appearing as a solo comedian.

When singer Dickie Valentine persuaded Smoothey that Tommy Layton wished to work with him, the team of "Smoothey and Layton" was created and performed together until 1960. On Boxing Day 1959 they appeared in BBC TV's The Good Old Days at Christmas. After the team separated in 1960, Smoothey continued his solo career performing in variety theatre, Summer shows, and pantomimes, and at such venues as the London Palladium.

==== Career personal highlight ====
Asked what he has enjoyed most about his long time in show business Smoothey stated:

"I have to say appearing in the Royal Variety Performance in the presence of Her Majesty Queen Elizabeth The Queen Mother in 1982 in the feature Underneath the Arches was very special. This took place at the Theatre Royal, Drury Lane. In our particular sketch there was Roy Hudd, Joe Black, Tommy Godfrey, Billy Gray, Peter Glaze, Christopher Timothy and myself.

"A highlight of the Royal Command Performance was the appearance of Ethel Merman who flew in especially from America to sing There's No Business Like Show Business. Sitting with her hairdresser before going on stage, she asked if she could have her hair all up front. The stylist remarked that there would be nothing to cover the back of her head. 'Honey, my name is Ethel Merman', replied the great singer, 'and I've never turned my back on an audience in all my life. So put it all up at the front and to hell with what anyone behind sees!'

"Backstage, dressed in a terrible old dressing gown, Ethel stumbled by mistake into our dressing room. She apologised, 'Oh boys I'm sorry, I've got the wrong dressing room.' 'You'll be alright,' said my colleague Tommy Godfrey. 'You stay with us, darling,' and sat on her knee. 'That's it boys' she exclaimed. I’m dressing in here from now on!' - and she stayed there for ages talking about American Vaudeville."

=== Television ===
Smoothey made a few television appearances from 1964 through 1990. In 1964 he appeared as himself in an episode of the Frankie Howerd comedy variety show. In 1967 he performed for an episode of the variety show The Good Old Days, and in 1968 performed in all 7 episodes of the BBC comedy variety series Kindly Leave the Stage. He returned to television in 1983 for an episode of the Channel 4 spoof talk show For 4 Tonight , and his last television appearance was in 1990 in an acting role of the series You Rang, M'Lord?.

=== Service ===
Smoothey was a member of the Grand Order of Water Rats from 1967 until his passing, and sat as King Rat in 2001. His late brother Len Lowe had been "King Rat" in 1983, marking Smoothey emplacement as the first time two brothers of the order had been King Rats.

Donald Ralph Smoothey was initiated into Hamilton Lodge No.3309 on 21 April 1971. WM 1983. He was presented with Provincial Honours in 1995 by Companion of the Grand Order of Water Rats, HRH Prince Michael of Kent, KCVO. He joined Chelsea Lodge No.3098 19 May 1995.

Smoothey served as secretary of The Vaudeville Golfing Society for many years, and was a respected member of the executive committee of The Entertainment Artistes' Benevolent Fund until his retirement from the role in June 2013.
