= Anne Chamney =

British medical engineer, inventor

Anne Rosemary Chamney
- Born: 16 April 1931; Amersham
- Died: 9 December 2008 (aged 77); Totteridge, London
- Occupations: Medical engineer, inventor
- Parents: Ronald Martin Chamney (father); Eleanor Margery Hampshire (mother)

Anne Rosemary Chamney CEng MIMechE (16 April 1931 – 9 December 2008) was a British mechanical engineer specialising in medical equipment. She is best known for her invention of a novel oxygen tent which was much cheaper than existing tents, much lighter and therefore easier to transport.

== Early life ==
Anne Rosemary Chamney was born in Amersham on 16 April 1931 to Eleanor Margery Hampshire and Ronald Martin Chamney. She had one older brother John, born in 1928. According to the 1911 census, her father Ronald was an engineer with the National Telephone Company and held a BSc in engineering. As a young child, Chamney was ambidextrous. She attended an all girls school from the age of nine until she was 16. She earned an MS in biomechanics at the University of Surrey and a PhD in physiology which focussed on the effect of carbon monoxide during pregnancy in rats, which influenced later research into the effect of smoking on humans during pregnancy.

== Career ==
Chamney studied at the Royal Aeronautical Society and became an apprentice at the De Havilland Aircraft Company in Hatfield from 1953 to 1958. She moved to become a Technical Assistant in the Medical Development Group at the British Oxygen Company between 1959 and 1961. Chamney patented an apparatus for humidifying gases in 1960 whilst working there.

Later she became a senior technician at University College Hospital Medical School in London where she evaluated hospital equipment. Whilst working there, in 1966 she invented of a novel oxygen tent which was much cheaper than existing tents, it was also lighter and therefore easier to transport. The oxygen tent was published in The Lancet in 1967 and received international publicity, with coverage in the United States stating that her invention cost only $50, when other oxygen tents cost up to $750. She credited being able to work closely with medical staff and developing clinical knowledge as being vital to the development of relevant and useful medical equipment.

By 1985, Chamney was Chief Technician in the Department of Anesthesia at the Royal Free Hospital in Hampstead.

Chamney was awarded the first James Clayton Prize in Medical Engineering from the Institution of Mechanical Engineers, and received an additional award in acknowledgement of her research and development work.

Chamney was also a Fellow of the Irish Genealogical Research Society and a member of the Women's Engineering Society.

Anne Chamney died on 9 December 2008 and was cremated on 16 December at Hendon Cemetery and Crematorium in north London.

== Selected publications ==
- Wayne, D.J., and Chamney, A.R. (1969) Oxygen tent performance. Physics in Medicine & Biology, 14(9) Oxygen tent performance
- Wayne, D.J., and Chamney, A.R. (1969) Oxygen tents: A comparison of two techniques. Anaesthesia, 24(4) Oxygen tents.: A comparison of two techniques
- Chamney, A.R. (1969) Humidification Requirements and Techniques. Including a Review of the Performance of Equipment in Current Use, 24(4) Humidification requirements and techniques.: Including a review of the performance of equipment in current use
