= Michael Braude Award for Light Verse =

Poetry award

The Michael Braude Award for Light Verse is a biennial award given for light verse in the English language, regardless of the author's nationality. It is presented by the American Academy of Arts and Letters and is accompanied by a $5,000 payment. Mrs. Lillian Braude established the award in memory of her husband, Michael Braude, in 1987.

== Recipients to date ==
- 2012: Roger Angell
- 2008: Christopher Reid
- 2006: John Fuller
- 2004: R. S. Gwynn
- 2002: Henry Taylor
- 1999: Thomas M. Disch
- 1997: Robert Conquest
- 1995: Wendy Cope
- 1993: Turner Cassity
- 1991: Gavin Ewart
- 1989: X. J. Kennedy

== See also ==
- American poetry
- List of poetry awards
- List of literary awards
- List of years in poetry
- List of years in literature
