= Daddy Wouldn't Buy Me a Bow Wow =

Song

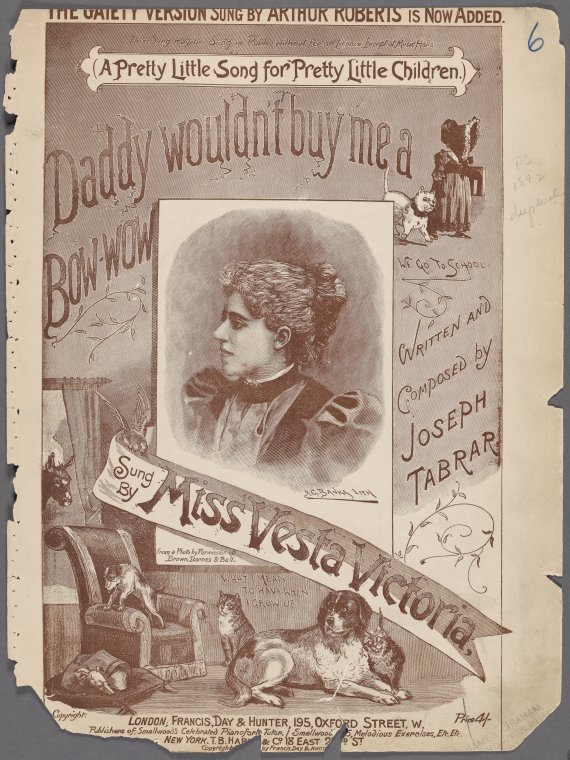
Sheet music cover from 1892

"Daddy Wouldn’t Buy Me a Bow Wow" is a song written in 1892 by prolific English songwriter Joseph Tabrar.

It was written for, and first performed in 1892 by, Vesta Victoria at the South London Palace, holding a kitten. The same year it was recorded by Silas Leachman for the North American Phonograph Co. of Chicago (Talking Machine Company of Chicago/Chicago Talking Machine). In 1895 Toulouse-Lautrec painted May Belfort singing it. The comedian Arthur Roberts also had success in the 1890s with the song.

The song featured in the 1934 musical movie Evergreen, sung by Jessie Matthews, and was also revived after World War II.

The chorus was sung by Helen Mirren and Peter Sellers in the 1980 movie The Fiendish Plot of Dr. Fu Manchu. It is also the tune Sarah Jane Smith whistles when she leaves the Doctor at the end of the Doctor Who episode "The Hand of Fear". It is sung by the EastEnders cast, led by Anna Wing (Lou Beale, as part of the 1985 EastEnders Sing Along. In the first episode of the 1983 BBC series Reilly, Ace of Spies, one of Sidney Reilly's mistresses performs a striptease to a phonograph recording of the song.

== On CD ==
- A version of Vesta Victoria singing the song can be found on the CD 60 Old-Time Variety Songs ISBN 0-86175-008-X
- It also appears on the Ultimate Pub Sing-A-Long Album

== Lyrics ==
I love my little cat, I do
His coat is oh so warm.
It comes with me each day to school
And sits upon the form
When teacher says "why do you bring
That little pet of yours?"
I tell her that I bring my cat
Along with me because

Daddy wouldn't buy me a bow-wow! bow wow!
Daddy wouldn't buy me a bow-wow! bow wow!
I've got a little cat
And I'm very fond of that
But I'd rather have a bow-wow
Wow, wow, wow, wow

We used to have two tiny dogs
Such pretty little dears
But daddy sold 'em 'cause they used
To bite each other's ears
I cried all day, at eight each night
Papa sent me to bed
When Ma came home and wiped my eyes
I cried again and said

Daddy wouldn't buy me a bow-wow! bow wow!
Daddy wouldn't buy me a bow-wow! bow wow!
I've got a little cat
And I'm very fond of that
But I'd rather have a bow-wow
Wow, wow, wow, wow

I'll be so glad when I get old
To do just as I "likes"
I'll keep a parrot and at least
A half a dozen tykes
And when I've got a tiny pet
I'll kiss the little thing
Then put it in its little cot
And on to it I'll sing

Daddy wouldn't buy me a bow-wow! bow wow!
Daddy wouldn't buy me a bow-wow! bow wow!
I've got a little cat
And I'm very fond of that
But I'd rather have a bow-wow
Wow, wow, wow, wow
