= Hendon Cemetery and Crematorium =

Cemetery and crematorium in London, England

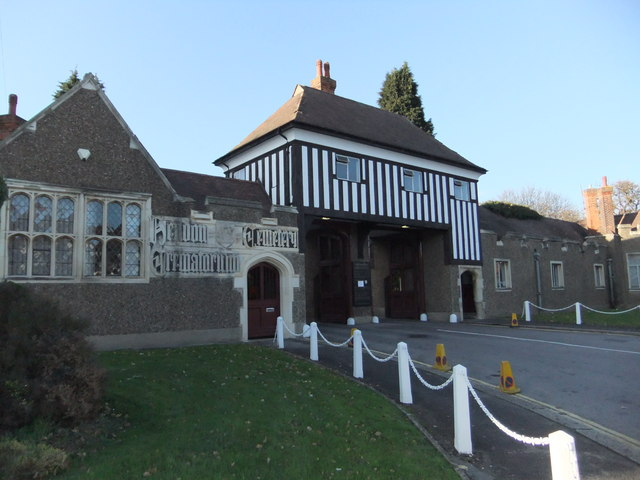
- Entrance
- Interactive map of Hendon Cemetery and Crematorium

Details
- Established: 1899
- Location: Holders Hill Road NW7 1NB
- Country: United Kingdom
- Coordinates: 51.6012°N 0.2095°W
- Type: Public
- Owned by: London Borough of Barnet
- Size: 42 acres (17 ha)
- Website: Hendon Cemetery and Crematorium
- Find a Grave: Hendon Cemetery and Crematorium

Hendon Cemetery and Crematorium is a cemetery and crematorium in north London, on Holders Hill Road between Mill Hill East tube station and the Great North Way. Originally developed by the Abney Park Cemetery Company Ltd, the cemetery opened in 1899 and the crematorium was added in 1922. It is in the London Borough of Barnet, which now runs it, and contains Muslim, Japanese, Greek Orthodox and Commonwealth War Graves Commission sections.

== War graves ==
The cemetery contains the war graves of 69 Commonwealth service personnel of World War I and of 156 from World War II. Those whose graves could not be marked by headstones are listed on two Screen Wall memorials near the Cross of Sacrifice, as are 14 casualties from the latter war who were cremated at Hendon Crematorium.

== Notable burials ==
- Anne Chamney, English mechanical engineer (cremated)
- W. H. Clemart, English ventriloquist
- Abul Fateh, Bangladeshi diplomat and statesman
- Semyon Frank, Russian philosopher
- Nazia Hassan, Pakistani singer-songwriter
- Buatier de Kolta, French magician
- Ruby Lindsay, Australian illustrator
- Nikolai Medtner, Russian composer and pianist
- Lynsey de Paul, English singer-songwriter and record producer
