= Kenilworth Court =

Coordinates: 51°27′58.01″N 0°12′56.85″W

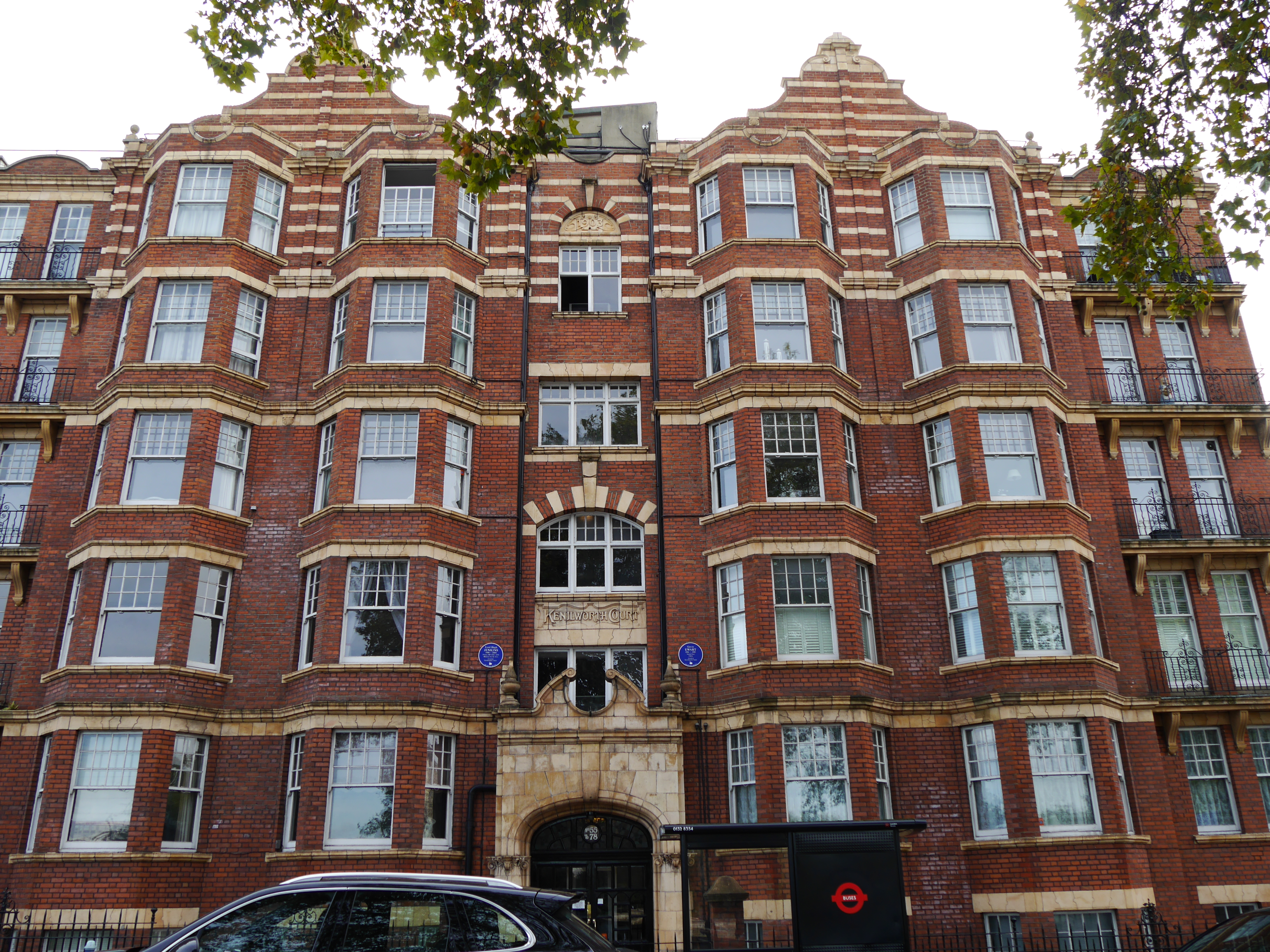
- Kenilworth Court from Lower Richmond road
- Interactive map of Kenilworth Court
- Location: Lower Richmond road, Putney, London SW15, England

History
- Built: 1903

Site notes
- Architect: R.C. Overton

Kenilworth Court is an Edwardian residential building in Putney in the London Borough of Wandsworth, it has had several notable residents.

== Location ==
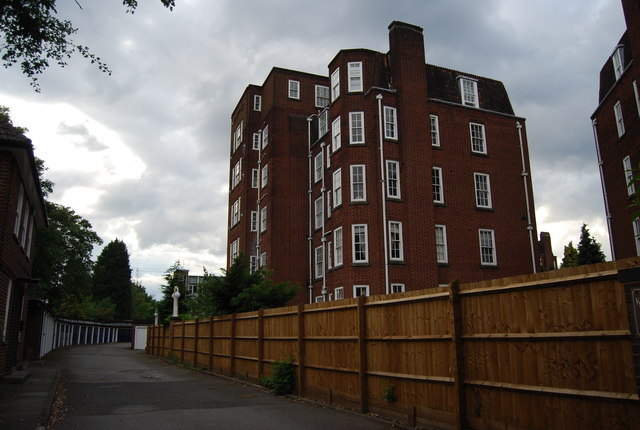
Kenilworth court from Kingsmere close

The building is on the south side of the Lower Richmond road, bordered with Waterman street and Kingsmere close, it lies within the Putney Embankment Conservation Area. Kenilworth Court contains four postcodes, SW15 1EN, SW15 1EW, SW15 1HA and SW15 1HB.

== Architecture and history ==
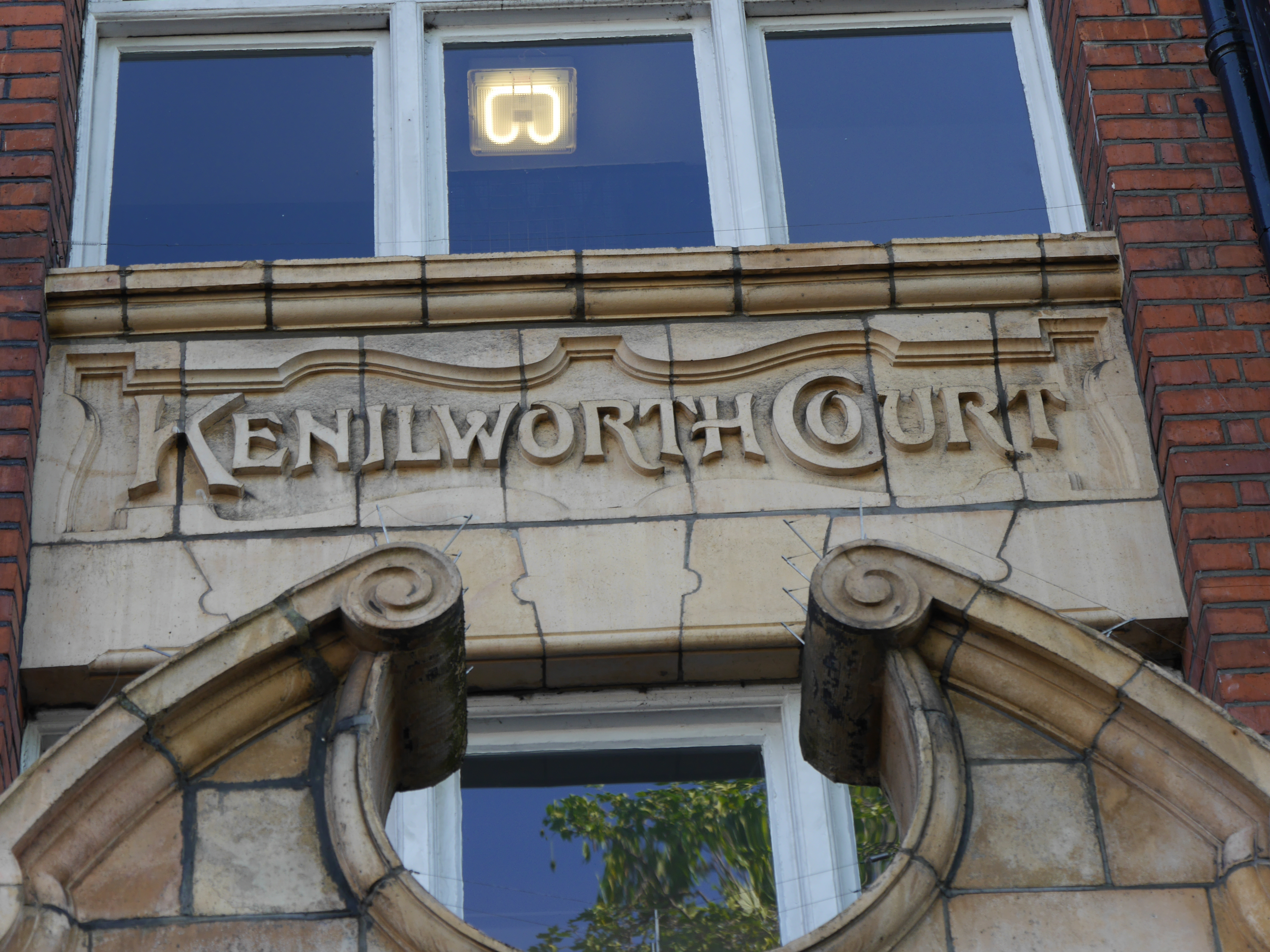
Kenilworth Court name on block

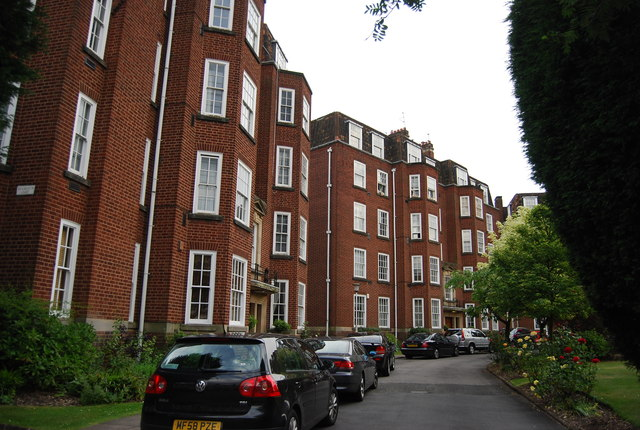
Kenilworth Court with garden

Kenilworth Court was designed by architect R. C. Overton, it was built from 1902 and completed by 1906. The building has Dutch gables, bracketed stone balconies, stone architraves over the windows and iron railings, with 'Kenilworth Court' displayed over the entrance to each block. There are 150 flat with an on site management teams spread between eight mansion blocks. The central courtyard had a tennis court before World War II, it was then used for growing vegetables and is now a managed garden.

It was originally built as rented family accommodation, but between the 1950s and 1970s residents acquired individual apartment leases, and gained freehold of the overall property. In 1976 'Kenilworth Court (Putney) Management Limited' was registered by seven residents under the Industrial and Provident Societies Act 1965. In 1986 the company changed its name to Kenilworth Court Co-Ownership Housing Association Limited, who have managed the building since then.

== Notable residents ==
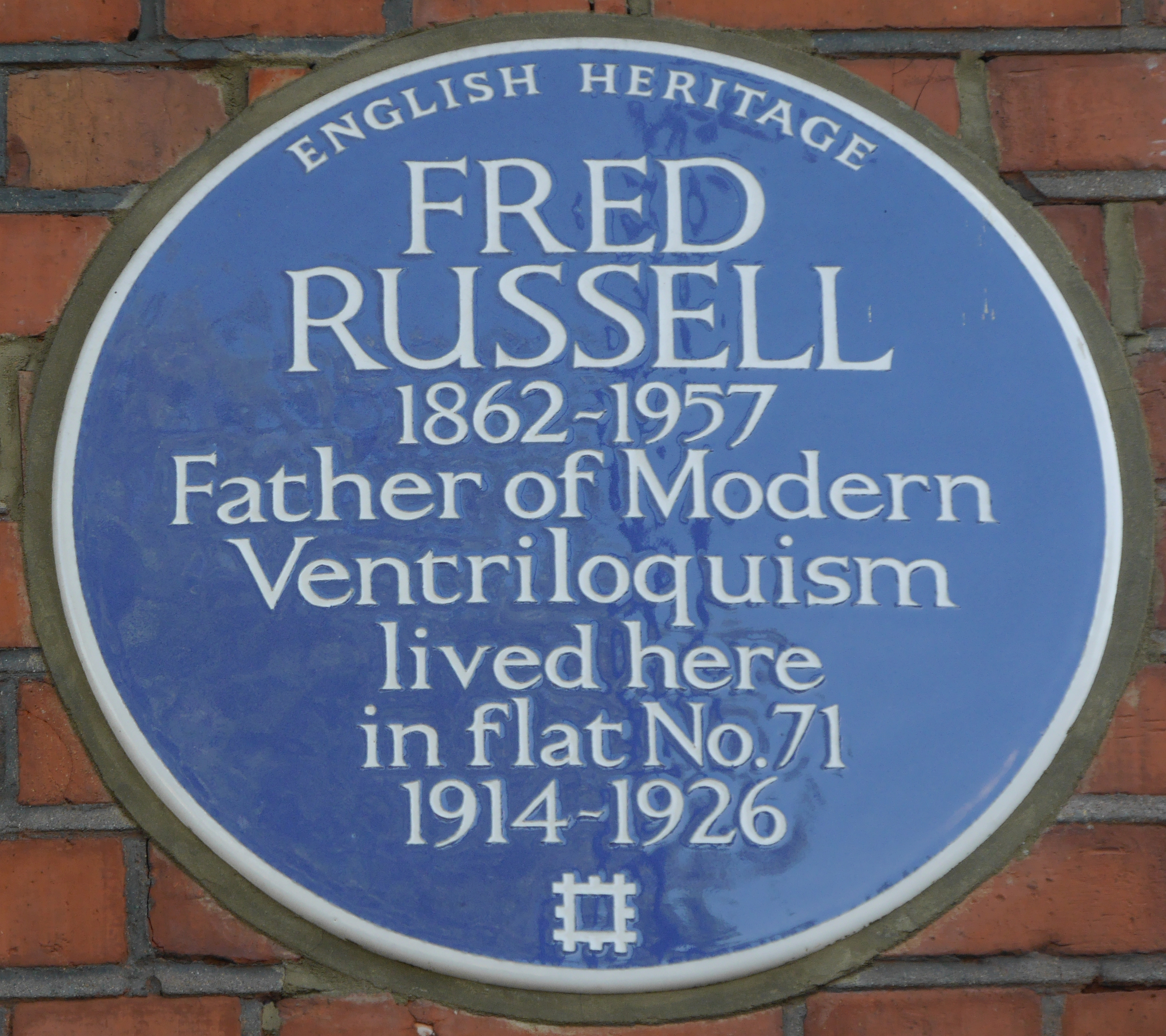
Fred Russell blue plaque

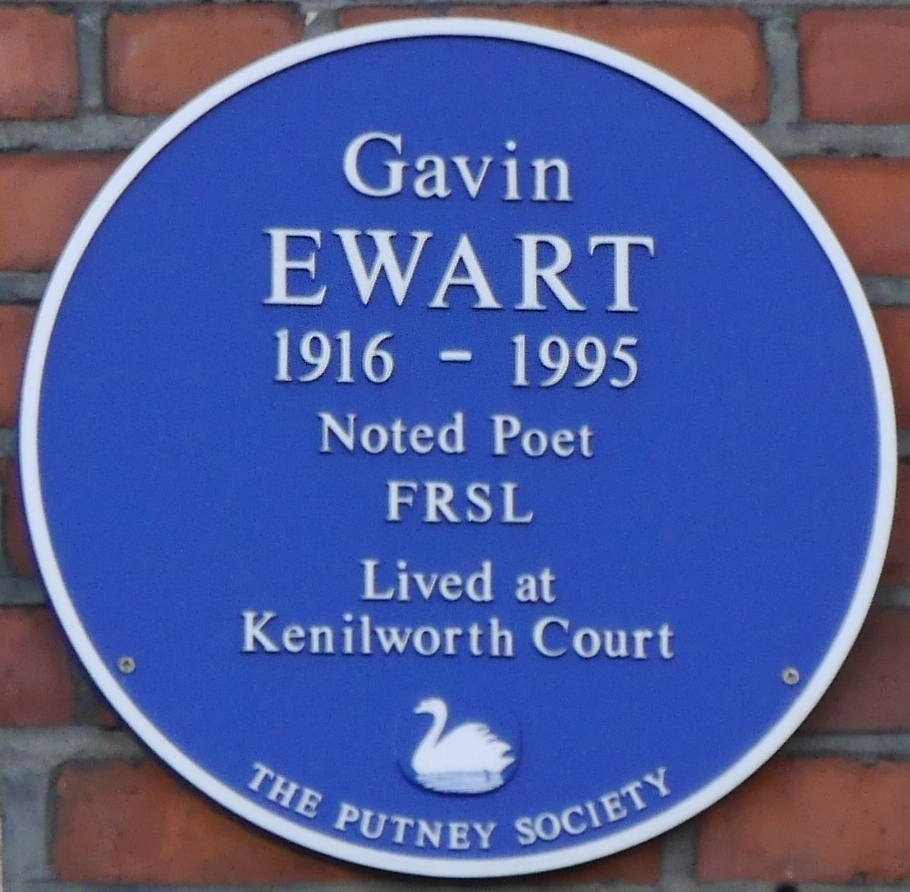
Gavin Ewart blue plaque

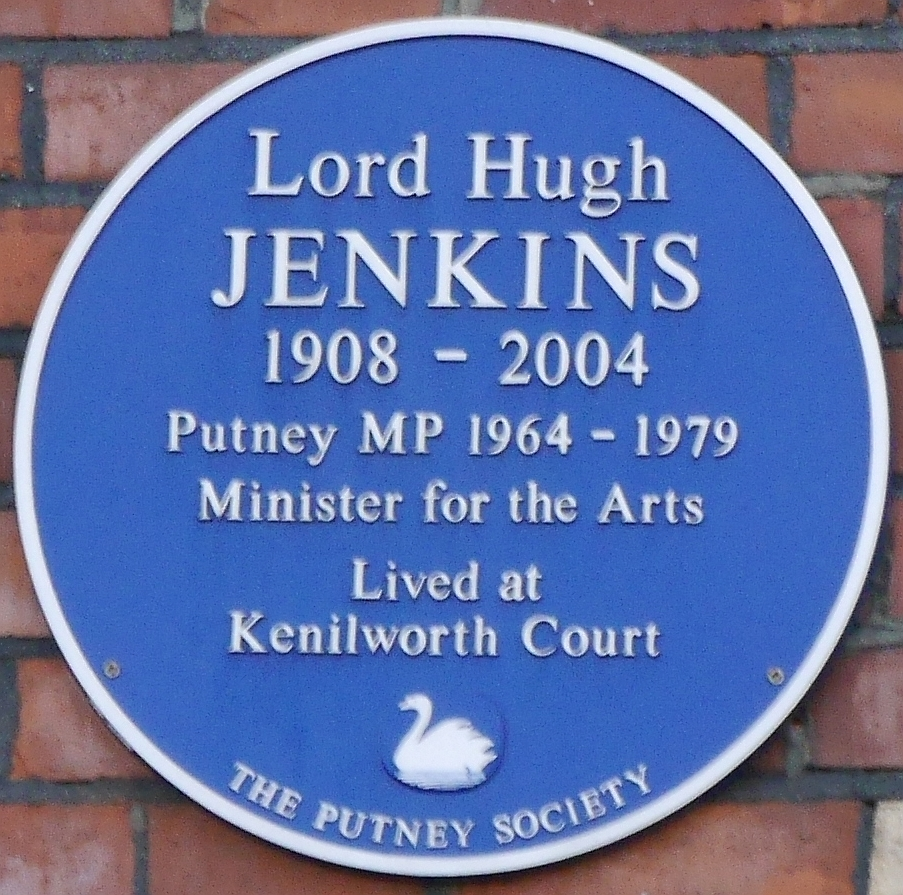
Hugh Jenkins blue plaque

Kenilworth Court has had several notable residents:

- Cyril Power (1872–1951) was an English artist who co-founded The Grosvenor School Of Modern Art in London.
- William Cooper (1910–2002) was an English novelist.
- Gavin Ewart (1916–1995) was a British poet.
- Jaroslav Drobný (1921–2001) was a World No. 1 amateur tennis champion
- Carol II (1893–1953) reigned as King of Romania from 8 June 1930 until 6 September 1940. He lived in Flat 113 Kenilworth Court (using Flat 112 Kenilworth Court for his retinue) while in London as Crown Prince before he ascended to the throne.
- Hugh Gater Jenkins, Baron Jenkins of Putney (1908–2004) was a British politician, campaigner and Labour Party member of Parliament and the House of Lords.
- Gary Kemp lived in Flat 143 for a few years in the 1980's
- Fred Russell (1862–1957) was an English ventriloquist. Usually credited as being the first to use a knee-sitting figure, he is known as "The Father of Modern Ventriloquism". He lived in Flat 71, Kenilworth Court, between 1914 and 1926.
- William Bullerwell (1916–1977) was a British geologist and geophysicist, Chief Geophysicist and Deputy Director of the Institute of Geological Sciences in Britain.

== Popular culture ==
Kenilworth Court has been a filming location for several productions:

- All the Colors of the Dark film (1972). Location of Jane Harrison's flat.
- Agatha Christie's Marple TV series Season 3, Episode 4: "Nemesis" (1 January 2009). Office of Raymond West.
- New Tricks TV series Season 9, Episode 9: "Part of a Whole" (22 October 2012). Stephen Fisher's flat.
