= If It Wasn't for the 'Ouses In Between =

British song

"If It Wasn't for the 'Ouses in Between"
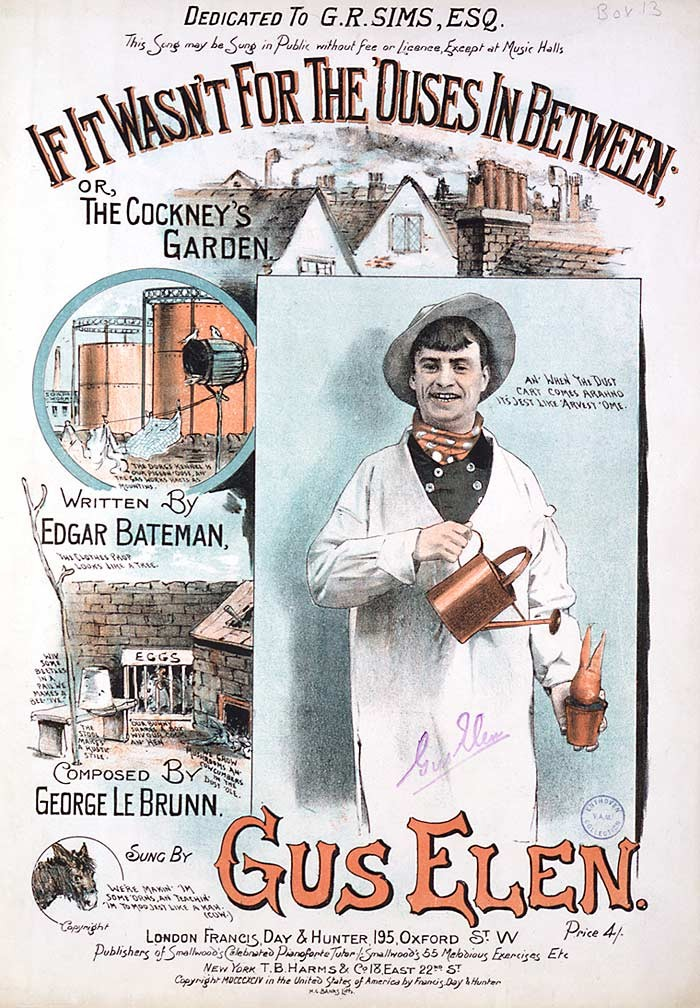

Song
- Language: English
- Published: 1894
- Genre: Music Hall
- Composer: George Le Brunn
- Lyricist: Edgar Bateman

"If It Wasn't for the 'Ouses in Between" (Roud 32453) is popular cockney music hall song of the late 19th century with lyrics by Edgar Bateman.

== History and description ==
The song was written by Edgar Bateman set to music composed by George Le Brunn in 1894. It was written to be sung initially by Gus Elen, with the melody designed for his particular intonation. Alongside "It's a Great Big Shame" also by Bateman and Le Brunn for Elen and of the same year, the song was one of their most successful works. Elen was known for his portrayal of cockney characters and in particular costermongers.

Like many popular songs of the era it was directed towards cockneys, exploring themes related to the particular struggles faced by working class Londoners in a way that provided both humour and pathos. The song describes a man who attempts to create a country garden in his East End home despite the cramped conditions. With significant constraints, he is forced to use discarded vegetable toppings as decoration, teaches his cow to moo and puts beetles in a pail as a substitute for a beehive.

== See also ==
- My London Country Lane
