= Gus Elen =

English music hall singer and comedian

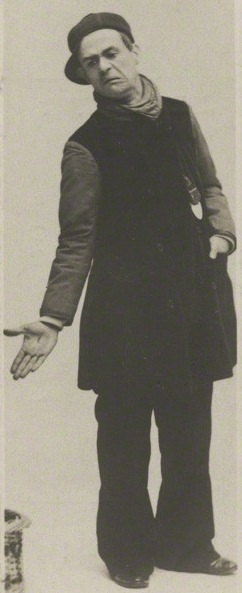
Gus Elen

Ernest Augustus Elen (22 July 1862 – 17 February 1940) was an English music hall singer and comedian. He achieved success from 1891, performing cockney songs including "Arf a Pint of Ale", "It's a Great Big Shame", "Down the Road" and "If It Wasn't for the 'Ouses in Between" in a career lasting over thirty years.

Born in Pimlico, London, Elen had worked as a barman and a draper's assistant and had packed eggs for the Co-op before becoming a singer. He began busking at an early age and found a position singing in a minstrel troupe. His solo success began in 1891 when he started performing in public houses, singing songs in a manner similar to many cockney fruit sellers of the time, known as costermongers - from the old word 'costard', meaning apple. Because of this, he became known as a "coster comedian". For the stage persona he had created, Elen dressed in a coster uniform of striped jersey, peaked cap turned towards one ear and a short clay pipe in the side of his mouth. His characters adopted a persona of being constantly bad-tempered and pugnacious. In 1907 he starred in a short film called Wait Till the Work Comes Round.

In his later years, Elen went to America during the English music hall strike. He performed the same act as he did in the UK, but box-office sales show that he was less successful than his friend, the singer Albert Chevalier, and so he returned to the UK. He then made several appearances as a top attraction in music halls across London. He appeared on stage occasionally in the 1930s, albeit briefly, and he appeared in the 1935 Royal Command Performance. He retired in 1914, shortly after returning from America. He made occasional appearances on stage and film before his death in 1940 aged 77.

== Biography ==
=== Early career ===
Elen was born at 103 Pulford Street, Pimlico, London. His father was Edwin Elen, a viewer of cloth in a military store, and his mother Mercy Elen, née Letherbarrow.

Elen started his career as a solo performer and briefly worked at the Old Marylebone Theatre in a 'blackface' comedy double act with a man named Daniels, who died in a boating accident a few years after the partnership was formed. After the death of Daniels, he returned to being a solo performer and bought the rights to "Never introduce your donah to a pal" from the song's writer A.E Durandeau; donah was cockney slang meaning girlfriend. The song was performed on stage on 4 June 1891, at Harewood's varieties in Hoxton.

Elen performed songs and sketches as the character of an old East End costermonger and became known as a 'coster' comedian. Elen drew inspiration from his experiences of growing up around people, similar to that of his persona on stage. Elen's performances were often misinterpreted as being a self caricature, but were performed in a realistic and simplistic manner, one that made him popular with his audiences.

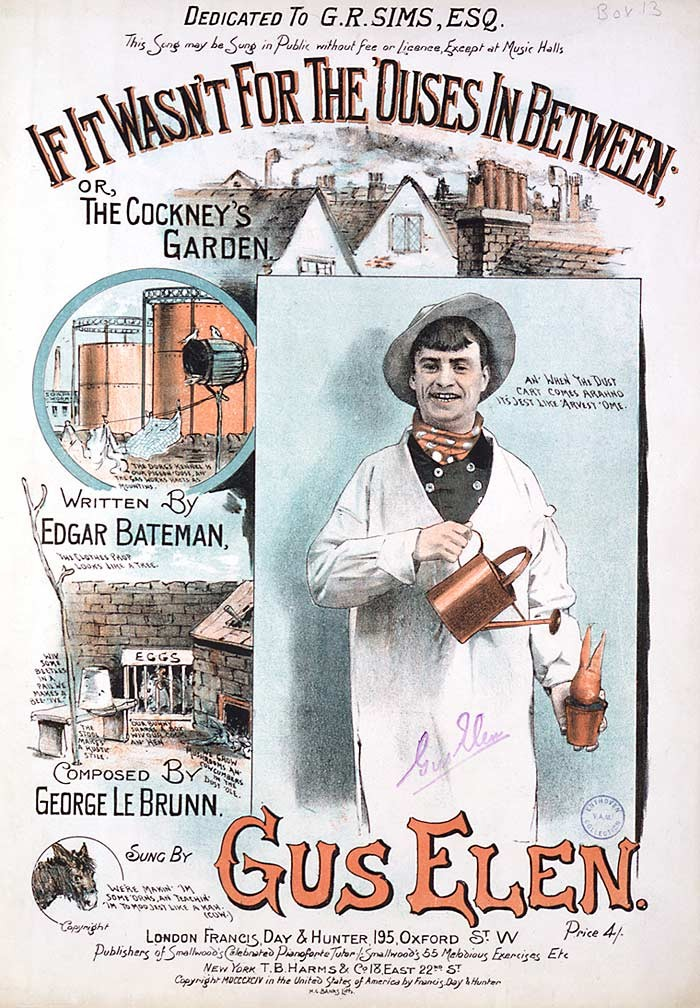
The sheet music of "If It Wasn't for the 'Ouses in Between"

In an interview, given after he had become a star, he said:

Years before I entered the ranks of music hall performers proper, I used to contribute to the programmes of the weekly sing songs held at such places as 'Poppy Lords' in Lisson Grove; the 'Magpie and Stump', Battersea; or the 'George Street Recital Hall'. At the last named hall, the salaries ranged from a shilling to three and sixpence a night with a cup of coffee and a bun thrown in by way of refreshment. In those days I often filled in a season on the 'waxeys' (on the seaside) at Margate and Ramsgate in a Negro minstrel troupe.

Elen's songs were often compared to those of Albert Chevalier, a contemporary to Elen and a major performer on the halls. There were many other coster performers on the Victorian music hall circuit, but throughout his career Elen maintained a particularly friendly rivalry with Chevalier.

=== Musical performances ===
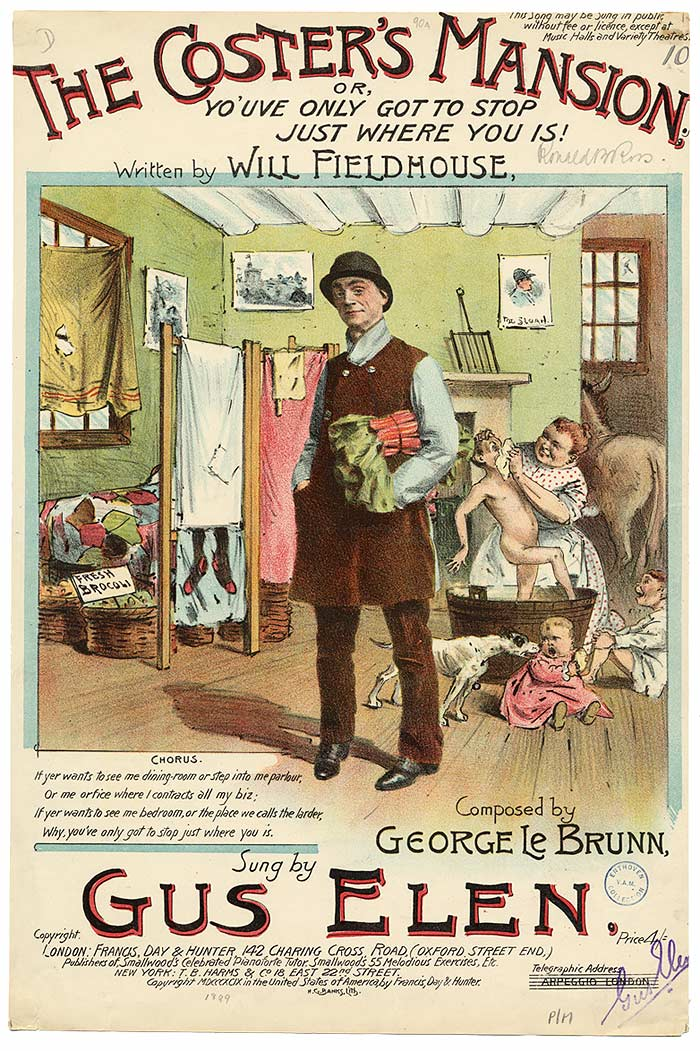
The Coster's Mansion, 1899 sheet music

The movements for each of Elen's songs were carefully rehearsed so that the performances themselves were clean and precise. Each gesture was powerfully distinct and could be seen from the back of the largest theatre.

Many of Elen's songs spoke of the living conditions of ordinary workers and about the cramped housing conditions of the East End. Commenting on the overcrowded poor parts of London, in one of his songs, he takes on the persona of a proud tenant boasting about the dismal place he lives in, and in particular the view from his 'garden':

Wiv a ladder and some glasses
You could see to 'Ackney marshes
If it wasn't for the 'ouses in between

— "If it Wasn't for the 'Ouses in Between"

The lyrics to "If It Wasn't for the 'Ouses In Between" were written by Edgar Bateman, who later wrote two more of Elen's songs: "She's Too Good to Live Is Mrs. Carter" and "The Postman's 'Oliday." The music to the songs was written by George Le Brunn, who wrote a vast number of music-hall songs and accompaniments for Marie Lloyd and Dan Leno, and also for Gus Elen's "It's a Great Big Shame". Chance Newton, a friend of Elen, spoke of his habit of leaving scores he was working on at the various pubs he visited en route to the particular hall he was travelling to.

"If It Wasn't for the 'Ouses In Between" is one of Elen's most popular songs. It is set within a typical working day of an East End costermonger, the backyards of London houses, and their close proximity within the neighbourhood.

=== Audience representation ===
His songs were bitter and realistic and rooted in the poverty and life of the East Enders who were his audience. The appeal to his audience, many of whom were poor, proved to be a relief to the working classes of society within London. His act would encourage his audience to laugh at the difficulties of working class life, and to celebrate one's capacity for survival. Some songs would go further and openly reject establishment values of hard work and moral rectitude. His song "Wait until the work comes round" was specifically written for the unemployed people of Victorian London.

Put your 'ead back on the pillow
And read your Daily Mirror
And wait until the work comes round

— "Wait until the work comes round"

=== Later career ===
In 1907, William Morris, a respected vaudeville performer in America, was sent to London by the czar of the American legitimate theatre, Abe Erlanger, who had formed "The Advanced Vaudeville". It was created to act as direct competition for the newly established Vaudeville Hegemony, which was operating in the eastern half of the US. Whilst in London, Morris saw a performance of Elen's at the Hackney Empire and signed him to take part in the new company.

Elen was offered $1,500 to work in the US. He accepted the offer and appeared on the same bill as Harry Lauder and Will Evans at The New York Theatre where he performed his repertoire of cockney songs to the delight of American audiences. The New York Times described his act as being "...strange, raucous, quavering voice with its queer breaks into the treble, the shambling gait and the sudden jerky gestures of a coster, with all the little mannerisms that serve to make him what he is".

The New York Dramatic News cited; "While his act is, in a sense, similar to that of Albert Chevalier, it is also radically different. Mr Elen portrays the coster as if he actually exists in his native element."The box-office sales indicated that Chevalier, who was also appearing in America, was more popular with American audiences than Elen and so he returned to the UK and performed for a further seven years as a top attraction in music halls across London, before his retirement.

Elen took early retirement in 1914 after 33 years of performing. He returned in the 1930s, albeit briefly, where he appeared in a film and in the 1935 Royal Command Performance.

== Personal life ==
Unlike most performers, Elen kept a meticulous record of his songs with notes about the gestures and emotions, props required and stage settings. He also wrote comments about how his performance was received. Elen was praised as an "authentic cockney from the poor streets of London" and was well known for his involvement in personally organised charity events. For many years he and his wife distributed free Christmas gifts to the poor in public.

Elen was a fiercely private person and although he was married with children, he would never refer to his family by their names when interviewed by the press. From 1898 Elen lived largely in Balham, where he bred poultry and took up photography. He also became a keen fisherman, particularly during a spell in residence on the south coast, and enjoyed shooting. Elen would not socialise with fellow artists, opting instead to go fishing, shooting or driving around the English countryside.

Elen died of liver cancer at his home in Balham, South London, on 17 February 1940, aged 77 and is buried in Streatham Park Cemetery. There is a blue plaque at his former home, 3 Thurleigh Avenue, Balham, which was erected on 6 October 1979 by Greater London Council at the request of the British Music Hall Society whose then President Don Ross unveiled it.
