= W. H. Clemart =

William Herbert Cartmel (1866 – 23 July 1915), known as W. H. Clemart, was an English ventriloquist and an organiser of variety performers in the Variety Artistes' Federation and the Grand Order of Water Rats.

He was born in Hulme, Manchester, the son of a prominent surgeon and local magistrate, and was baptised there on 4 May 1866. He was well educated, but decided to work as a stage ventriloquist, adopting the surname Clemart (an anagram of his birth name). By 1906, he became involved in the formation of the Variety Artistes' Federation (VAF) in London, a trade union for music hall and variety performers. He became general secretary of the VAF in 1909, and later its manager and chairman. It was said that "the inception and birth of the Federation were largely due to his unfailing energy and his command of all the details of the profession, and his tactful handling of difficult problems helped in an immeasurable degree towards the successful organisation of the profession." He was also 'King Rat' of the Grand Order of Water Rats charity in 1908.

He died of lung cancer in London in 1915 at the age of 49, and was buried at Hendon Cemetery.
