= Val Parnell =

British television and theatre executive (1892–1972)

- Born: Valentine Charles Parnell; 14 February 1892; London, England
- Died: 22 September 1972 (aged 80); Portsea Place, London
- Occupations: Theatre and music hall impresario, television executive
- Parent: Thomas Parnell
- Relatives: Jack Parnell (nephew)

Valentine Charles Parnell (14 February 1892 – 22 September 1972) was a British television managing director and presenter, actor and theatrical impresario. A former staple of stage production, his career in television started with the launch of the ITV network in 1955.

== Life and career ==
Parnell was born in London, the son of Fred Russell (né Thomas Frederick Parnell), a ventriloquist. He began his theatrical career at age 13 working as an office boy for a music-hall circuit. In 1945, after George Black's death he took over as managing director of the Moss Empires music hall and variety circuit, in charge of some of London's most well-known theatres, including the London Palladium, The Victoria Palace and the Theatre Royal, Drury Lane.

He adopted a controversial, but very successful, policy of presenting high-priced, big-name American acts at the top of the bill. Among many, the list included Carmen Miranda, Judy Garland, Sophie Tucker, Bing Crosby, Danny Kaye, Rosemary Clooney, the Andrews Sisters with Vic Schoen and his orchestra, Bob Hope, Liza Minnelli, Lena Horne, Ella Fitzgerald, Peggy Lee, Frank Sinatra, Sammy Davis Jr., Frankie Laine and Johnnie Ray, freezing out many British stars of the day, who were relegated to second-billing.

He auditioned and signed 12-year-old Julie Andrews for her first professional performance and introduced her to her manager, Charles Tucker, also known as Uncle Charlie Tucker.

In 1956 he was appointed managing director of Associated Television (ATV). He took a personal interest in the station's output and presented the top-rated ITV weekly musical variety show Val Parnell's Sunday Night at the London Palladium until 1965. British stars on the show included Cliff Richard and the Shadows, Petula Clark, the Beatles and the Rolling Stones.

Parnell became associated with a property development company and began to sell Moss Empires' theatres for redevelopment. He resigned as managing director of Moss Empires in 1958 to concentrate on ATV but remained as a director until 1960 but retained an interest in the Palladium.

He lost his position as managing director of ATV to Lew Grade in 1962 but remained on the board.

When it became known in 1966 that this fate awaited the London Palladium, Prince Littler organised a take-over to save the theatre and Val Parnell retired to live in France.

He died of a heart attack on 22 September 1972 and was cremated at Golders Green Crematorium, where a memorial plaque was erected in the West Courtyard at the end of the columbarium.
