= Joseph Tabrar =

- Born: 5 November 1857; Clerkenwell, London, England
- Died: 22 August 1931 (aged 73) Camberwell, London
- Genres: Music hall
- Occupation: Songwriter
- Years active: 1870s–1920s

Joseph Tabrar (5 November 1857 – 22 August 1931) was a prolific English writer of popular music hall songs. His song "Daddy Wouldn't Buy Me a Bow Wow" (1892) became Vesta Victoria's first major popular success.

== Biography ==
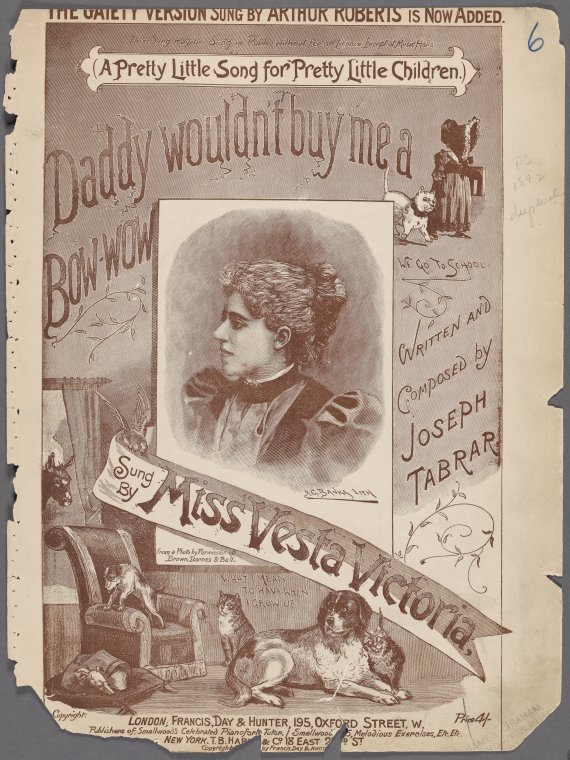
Sheet music for Daddy Wouldn't Buy Me a Bow Wow 1892

Tabrar was born in Clerkenwell, London; his father was a gas fitter, George Tabrar. Joseph Tabrar began his musical career in the church choir. By the age of 13 he was singing at Evans Music-and-Supper Rooms. He performed in music halls as a clown and acrobat as well as a musician, and for some years was a member of the Moore and Burgess Minstrels who performed regularly at St James's Hall in Piccadilly. His brother Tom and sister Lizzie also became music hall entertainers.

Tadrar soon became recognised by performers as a songwriter. In 1880, his song "I Am a Millionaire" was performed by George Leybourne and became successful, and by 1881 Tabrar was describing himself in the census as an "author and composer". He wrote Leybourne's 1883 success "Ting Ting, That's How the Bell Goes", and wrote and composed songs for pantomimes performed at the Pavilion Theatre, Whitechapel, including Little Red Riding Hood (1884), Cinderella (1892), Sindbad the Sailor (1893), Whittington and His Cat (1895), and Jack and the Beanstalk (1897).

His 1892 song "Daddy Wouldn't Buy Me a Bow Wow" was originally written for Ada Reeve, but when Vesta Victoria heard it she immediately started to perform it, to great success. His other successes included "The Ship Went Down" (1898, performed by Harry Rickards), "For Months and Months and Months" (1909, performed by Jack Smiles), as well as many songs performed by Charles Godfrey, Marie Lloyd, George Robey, and others.

He established his office in Stamford Street, Waterloo. Over his 60-year songwriting career, Tabrar wrote thousands of songs, many of them written to order; he is known to have written 7,200 songs, but claimed to have written more than twice that number. According to Peter Gammond: "There was hardly a music hall artist during his time who did not call upon 'Joe' for some material: this included, besides songs, monologues, duologues, sketches, short operettas, and many pantomime scripts...".

His son Joseph, who performed as Fred Earle, became a popular comic and music hall entertainer. The elder Joseph Tabrar continued to write songs, and teach songwriting skills, from his office until after the First World War. He made relatively little money from his songs and in 1899 described himself as "impecuniously embarrassed"; a benefit concert was held with such performers as Dan Leno, G. H. Chirgwin, and Florrie Forde. In 1916, a second benefit concert was arranged to provide financial support, but it was poorly attended.

He died in Camberwell in 1931, aged 73. Tabrar is buried in the former VABF memorial at Streatham Park Cemetery, which has been restored by The Music Hall Guild of Great Britain and America.

== Songs ==
Tabrar's songs include:

- "All Bad! Very Very Bad" (1887?)
- "Bid Me Goodbye For Ever"
- "Daddy Wouldn't Buy Me a Bow Wow" (1892)
- "Dear Old Ned"
- "For Months and Months and Months" (1909)
- "Goodbye! Goodbye!! Goodbye!!!" (1887?)
- "He’s Sailing On the Briny Ocean"
- "Hundreds and Thousands"
- "Just a Little" (1889?)
- "Madame Duvan" (1880s)
- "Mary Ann"
- "Not While Britannia's Alive" (1890?)
- "Oh! You Little Darling" (188?)
- "She's a Real Good Mother" (1883)
- "Ting Ting That's How The Bell Goes" (1883)
- "Trilby's Revival"
- "Waiting Waiting Waiting"
