= Oh! Mr Porter =

British music hall song

"Oh! Mr Porter" is an old British music hall song about a girl who has got on the wrong train. It was famously part of the repertoires of the artistes Norah Blaney and Marie Lloyd. It was written in 1892 by George Le Brunn and his brother Thomas, and taken on an extended provincial tour that same year by Marie Lloyd. The lyrics include this chorus:

Oh! Mr Porter, what shall I do?
I want to go to Birmingham
And they're taking me on to Crewe,
Take me back to London, as quickly as you can,
Oh! Mr Porter, what a silly girl I am.

Birmingham is a large city in England. Crewe is a town better known as a railway junction than as a destination. The fastest route on the West Coast Main Line to Crewe and stations further north does not use the loop via Birmingham.

== Cultural legacy ==
The song is alluded to in the 1922 novel Ulysses by James Joyce.

The title of Rose Macaulay's 1926 novel Crewe Train is a reference to the song.

The 1937 film Oh, Mr Porter! starring Will Hay was clearly at least in part inspired by the song "Oh! Mr Porter". Hay's character is called Mr William Porter; although he is not in fact a railway porter, but the stationmaster of a Northern Irish station; this leads to some confusion, typical of Hay's films. A snatch of the song can be heard over the opening credits although this version says, "I want to go to Birmingham, and they're taking me on to Crewe! Oh, Mr Porter! What a funny man you are!"

The 1962 British film The Password is Courage includes a scene in which British prisoners of war on a German train sing "Oh, Mr Porter!" as they throw burning straw on the explosive cargo of a passing munitions train.

In 1966, the band Herman's Hermits recorded an arrangement of the song by Kenny Lynch. It consists essentially of the chorus repeated several times, but with Liverpool and Manchester as desired destinations rather than Birmingham. Liverpool was the birthplace of beat music, but this band originated from Manchester.

The song was adapted for use in the 1996–97 BBC television situation comedy Oh, Doctor Beeching! and sung by Su Pollard.

Oh, Dr Beeching! what have you done?
There once were lots of trains to catch,
But soon there will be none,
I'll have to buy a bike, 'cos I can't afford a car,
Oh, Dr. Beeching! what a naughty man you are!

Dr Beeching was a chairman of British Railways, who became a household name in Britain in the early 1960s for a report which led to far-reaching reductions in the railway network.

In 2023 English comedian Alexei Sayle, in his BBC Radio 4 radio series "Strangers on a Train", suggested that the young woman's failure to reach her intended destination was a reference to premature ejaculation and lack of sexual satisfaction

== See also ==
- List of train songs
