= Len Lowe =

English actor, scriptwriter and musician (1916–1999)

- Born: Leonard Alfred Smoothey; 17 December 1916; Fulham, London, England
- Died: 21 August 1999 (aged 82); London, England
- Other name: Leonard Lowe
- Occupations: Comedian, actor, scriptwriter, musician
- Years active: 1920s–1980s

Leonard Lowe (born Leonard Alfred Smoothey; 17 December 1916 – 21 August 1999) was an English comedian, actor, scriptwriter and musician.

== Biography ==
He was born in Fulham, London, and studied at the Italia Conti School. As a child, he featured in several West End pantomimes and shows, including the original production of Noël Coward's Cavalcade in 1931. He also acted in Shakespeare plays at the Open Air Theatre in Regents Park, and in the musical comedy The White Horse Inn at the Coliseum Theatre.

In 1935, the bandleader Jack Hylton invited Lowe to join his orchestra as a singer and guitarist. He played in Hylton's hit revue Life Begins at Oxford Circus at the London Palladium, and then in the film She Shall Have Music. He also toured the United States with Hylton's orchestra.

In 1938 Lowe teamed up with his brother, Bill Lowe, to form a comic double act. They broke with British convention by both comedians being smartly and fashionably dressed, in the style of American comic pairings and later adopted by Morecambe and Wise. They toured together, and after being called up to join the military in the Second World War, headlined in one of Ralph Reader's Gang Shows. Len and Bill Lowe appeared in Ann Dvorak's 1943 propaganda film There's a Future in It, and toured American bases with Dvorak. After the end of the war, they appeared regularly on BBC radio, and continued to appear in British comedy films, such as A Date with a Dream (1948) and Melody Club (1949), both starring Terry-Thomas.

The pairing ended in 1950, when Bill Lowe married actress Jeannie Carson, and moved to the United States. After appearing on television as a foil to Charlie Chester, Len Lowe then linked up with another brother, Don Smoothey, who used the stage name Chester Ladd. As Lowe and Ladd, they performed in theatre shows and pantomimes, and toured together nationally and internationally, especially in Australia and New Zealand, before splitting up in 1956.

In 1958, Lowe featured again on television, as partner to Anthea Askey in the series The Dickie Henderson Half Hour, produced by Jack Hylton for the Associated-Rediffusion network on ITV. He returned to Australia, where he featured in variety shows, and wrote, produced, and appeared in his own television series there. After returning to Britain, he continued to appear regularly on television as a comic actor in the 1960s, in shows such as those fronted by Al Read, Arthur Haynes, Benny Hill, and Dick Emery, as well as on It's a Square World and The Basil Brush Show. In films, he appeared in Charlie Chaplin's A Countess from Hong Kong (1966), and Carry On Loving (1970). He also appeared as a straight actor in the television series Colditz (1974).

Lowe was active in the show business charity, the Grand Order of Water Rats, holding the honorary position of King Rat in 1983.

He died of prostate cancer in 1999, aged 82.
