= Clarkson Rose =

English comedian (1890–1968)

- Born: Arthur Carl Rose; 8 December 1890; Dudley, Worcestershire, England
- Died: 23 April 1968 (aged 77); Eastbourne, Sussex
- Occupations: Comedian, actor, theatrical revue producer
- Spouse: Olive Fox (m. 1918; died 1964)

Clarkson Rose (born Arthur Carl Rose; 8 December 1890 – 23 April 1968) was an English comedian, actor and theatrical revue producer, closely associated with entertainment in British seaside resorts. He was renowned for his performances as a pantomime dame.

== Biography ==
Rose was born in Dudley, Worcestershire, and started work as a bank clerk in Shrewsbury while performing in the evenings as A. C. Rose. He formed a small revue group, the Pengwern Players, and became a full-time entertainer and actor. In 1911 he joined the Liverpool Repertory Company, and also toured in a Shakespearian troupe led by Estelle Stead. In 1915 he helped establish the breakaway Liverpool Commonwealth Company, and acted in Trelawny of the 'Wells' that year in London.

Performing in Westcliff-on-Sea in 1918, he met pianist and entertainer Olive Fox, who was to become his wife and partner in the double act "Fox and Rose". They performed together in music halls, variety shows and pantomimes in Britain and Ireland over the next few years. In 1921, he established his own revue, Twinkle, at Ryde on the Isle of Wight. In different formats, the show was to continue for the next 45 years. In Bristol in 1922, Fox was taken ill so that Rose performed alone; the show was a success, and he was booked as a solo entertainer for further engagements.

Rose made many recordings during the 1920s and 1930s, mostly for Zonophone Records, including "Back I Went to the Ministry of Labour", "Three Cheers For The Middle Classes", and "I Had To Go And Draw Another Pound Out". He played his first pantomime role in Birmingham in 1927, in Robinson Crusoe with Robb Wilton. Their combination was described by the critic James Agate as "the best... since the days of Dan Leno and Herbert Campbell...". The following year, Rose appeared in the Royal Variety Performance as a pantomime dame. He and Fox toured Australia with their Twinkle revue company in 1933, extending his tour to incorporate his show into Ernest Rolls's revue Tout Paris.

In the late 1930s, Rose continued to tour successfully with his revue, as well as making regular appearances in pantomime. He worked for ENSA during the Second World War, and continued with his revues and pantomime roles through the 1940s and 1950s. Among the comedians he discovered over the years were Terry Scott and Norman Vaughan. Rose was elected 'King Rat' of the Grand Order of Water Rats charity in 1958.

Olive Fox retired in 1956 and died in 1964, whereupon Rose himself retired the Twinkle revue. He wrote a memoir, Beside the Seaside, published in 1960, and continued to perform in pantomimes, his final performances being in Leicester in 1967.

He died in Eastbourne, Sussex, in 1968 at the age of 77.
