= Charles Gulliver =

British music-hall producer and impresario

Charles Gulliver (7 April 1882 – 8 June 1961) was a British music-hall producer and impresario who was also the secretary and a founder of the Variety Artistes' Federation in 1906.

Born in Southampton, in his youth, Gulliver worked in a solicitors' office, and thereby gained a basic understanding of the law. The office building in which he worked also housed the offices of The Automobile Association (AA), and after demonstrating an interest in cars, he served for a short time as secretary and treasurer of the AA. At the time, the position was unpaid, so Gulliver focused on searching for a paid, full-time successor.

Gulliver served as the first secretary of the Variety Artistes' Federation, a trade union representing variety performers. In 1909, he became secretary of the London Theatres of Varieties, followed by a similar post with Barrasford Halls. He became managing director of the London Palladium in 1912.

In the 1920s, Gulliver became managing director of the Moss Empires group of theatres, originated in Scotland by Edward Moss.

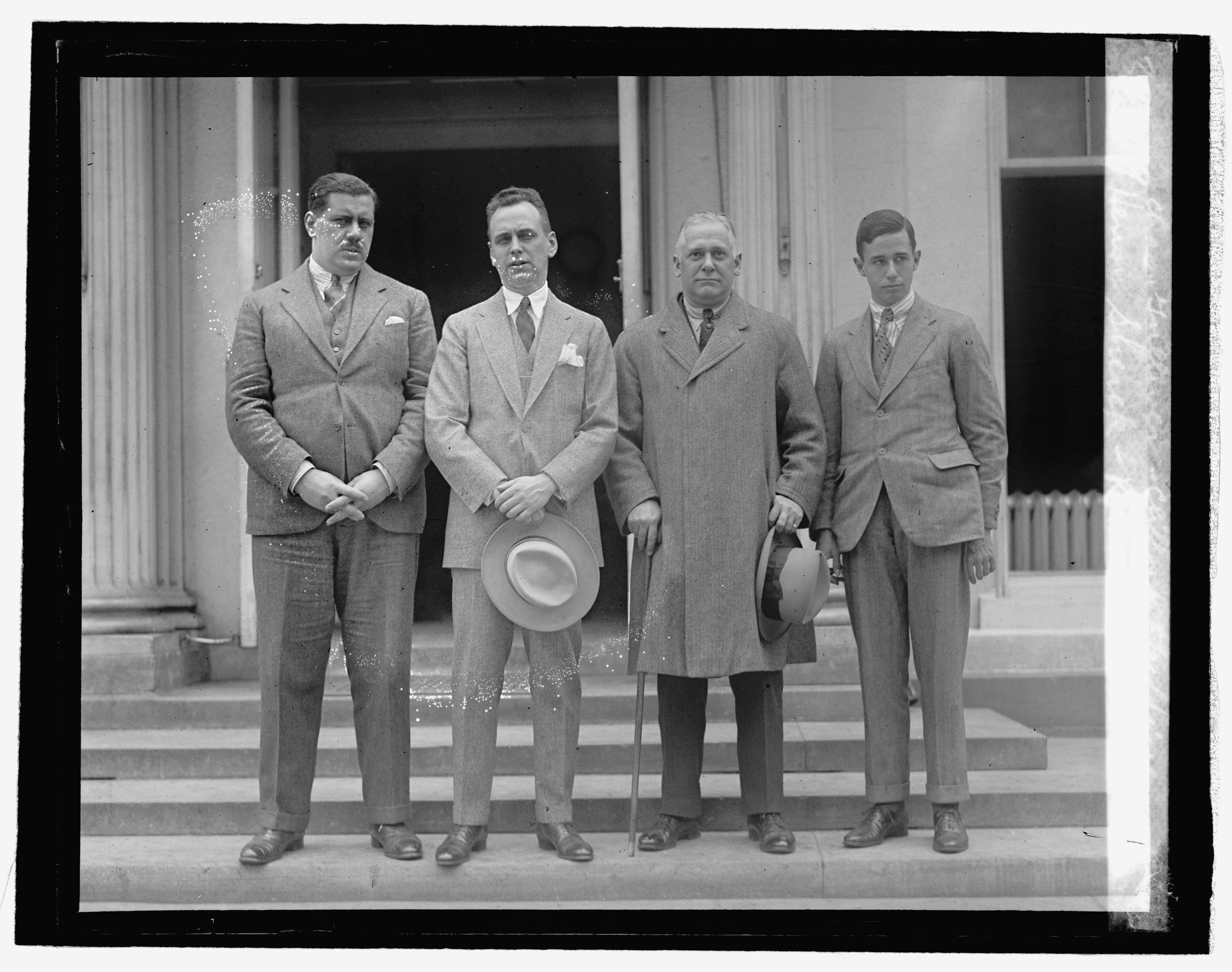

Gulliver retired from the variety business in 1932.

He died at his home in Bexhill on 8 June 1961, aged 79.

Trade union offices
Preceded by New position	General Secretary of the Variety Artistes' Federation; 1906–1907	Succeeded by Monte Bayly
