= Edgar Bateman (lyricist) =

English lyricist (1860–1946)

Edgar Bateman (13 February 1860 – 17 August 1946) was an English lyricist of music hall songs.

He was born Edgar Davies, in Marylebone, London, the son of Ann Davies who later married William Bateman. He worked as a printer's assistant, but became attracted to the music halls and theatres, and by 1890 worked for a music publisher. In 1894, while sitting at home in Clerkenwell, he was admiring his view over London landmarks, noticing the growth of new housing development, and wrote the words to "If it Wasn’t for the 'Ouses in Between". With music by George Le Brunn, the song became a great success for singer and comedian Gus Elen, and has been described as "one of the best songs of the music hall, and a song worthy of a very high place in the popular tradition". The following year, Bateman and Le Brunn wrote another successful song for Gus Elen, "It's a Great Big Shame".

In 1897, Bateman started work for music publisher David Day, touring music halls and theatres to discover new performers and novel songs that he could publish. Bateman became noted for his ability to "drink beer by the gallon and still remain sober", while reporting back to Day on a daily basis.

Bateman died in Finchley, London, in 1946, aged 86.
