= Jack Lotto =

- Jack Lotto in about 1900
- Born: John Egington; 11 October 1856; Kinver, Staffordshire, United Kingdom
- Died: 28 August 1944 (aged 87); Croydon, Surrey, United Kingdom
- Occupation: Entertainer

Jack Lotto (born John Egington; 11 October 1856–28 August 1944) was a British music hall performer of the late Victorian and Edwardian eras whose speciality was a trick-cycling act. With entertainer Joe Elvin he co-founded the show business charity the Grand Order of Water Rats in 1889. Later he managed his children in the popular cycling act 'Lotto, Lilo and Otto'.

== Biography ==
Lotto was born as John Eggington or Eginton (there are various spellings) in 1856 in Kinver in Staffordshire, the son of Elizabeth and Joseph Eggington, a Bundler of Iron. In 1877 in Sheffield he married Clara Parkin (1861-1904), the daughter of John Parkin and Martha Sutcliffe. Their children were Alfred (born 1878), Walter (born 1879), Ernest (born 1881), Annie (born 1883), John (1884), Clara (born 1886), Albert (born 1887), Arthur (born 1890), Joseph (1891), Daisy (1892), Charlotte (known as Lottie) (1893), John (1893), Edward (known as Val Lotto) (1895), May (born 1896), Victoria (born 1896), Bertie (1897) and Winnie (1898-1899). Several of the children were managed by their father in the music hall trick-cycling act 'The Lottos', or as 'Lotto, Lilo and Otto - The Champion Juvenile Bicyclists'.

In 1889 Lotto and entertainer Joe Elvin owned a trotting pony called The Magpie. On one occasion The Magpie was described as "looking like a drowned rat." As the pony was a regular race winner, its owners decided that they would use the profits to help performers who were less fortunate than themselves. Taking the name from their wet, bedraggled pony, the Grand Order of Water Rats was formed to collate their efforts, as well as to serve as a social club for performers.

In September 1899 'Lotto, Lilo and Otto' appeared at the Shoreditch Empire in London, at the Charing Cross Music Hall in Lambeth in May 1894, and at the Tivoli Music Hall on The Strand in March 1895.

'Lotto, Lilo and Otto' also appeared in the silent film Clever and Comic Cycle Act in 1900, directed by James Williamson and filmed at Hove in Sussex.

On his death in Croydon in Surrey in August 1944 he was buried next to his friends and fellow music hall entertainers Joe Elvin and Eugene Stratton at Bandon Hill Cemetery.
