= Paul Martinetti =

French-American entertainer and stage actor

- Born: 22 June 1846; Paris, France
- Died: 26 December 1924 (aged 78); Algiers, French Algeria
- Occupations: Entertainer, actor, pantomimist, mime artist
- Years active: c.1860–c.1910

Paul Martinetti (June 22, 1846 – December 26, 1924) was a French-American entertainer and stage actor. He was popular in English music halls and pantomimes between the 1870s and 1900s, and in retirement became a British national.

== Biography ==
Martinetti was born in France, the son of Julien and Adele Martinetti, who were Italian subjects. Julien Martinetti (1821–1884) was from a long-established family of acrobats, mime artists and pantomime performers who travelled widely throughout Europe. With his brother Philippe (1829–1874), he joined with the equally famous family troupe led by Gabriel Ravel, and they travelled in 1848 to the United States, where they performed together for several years, sometimes in association with Charles Blondin. After the Ravel family returned to France, Julien and Philippe Martinetti continued touring North and South America, and Australia, with their own troupe, including Paul and other family members performing on tightropes. Paul also performed in the character of Harlequin. Following Philippe's death, Julien remained in the United States.

Julien's sons Paul and Alfred (27 December 1854 – 17 August 1924) travelled to England in 1876. Paul made in his London debut in a performance of The Magic Flute at the Princess's Theatre, and his first music hall appearance in February 1877 as a member of a comedy ballet troupe. With Alfred, he then formed his own pantomime company. Over the next thirty years, he became "one of music hall's biggest attractions", and presented a series of "lurid mime melodramas" often with his brother. The sketches included "Robert Macaire", "The Duel in the Snow", and "The Remorse". He also performed realistic ape impressions, with the critic G.F. Scotson-Clark describing him in 1899 as "the finest pantomimist of his day... His work at best rises above mere agility. He is magnetic and versatile....".

Paul Martinetti remained in England. He became a leading member of the variety profession, and was 'King Rat' in the Grand Order of Water Rats in 1899. In 1910, he and his wife were neighbours and friends of Dr. Crippen, and attended a dinner given by Crippen and his wife, Belle Elmore, on the evening when she was killed. Martinetti became an important witness at his trial for murder. In 1914, he gave up his American citizenship and became a British national.

After relocating to Algiers on health grounds, he died in a hotel there in 1924 at the age of 78.
