= Angelo Martinetti =

Italian painter (1830–?)

- Born: 1830; Rome
- Died: Unknown

Angelo Martinetti (1830 – unknown) was an Italian painter, mainly of still-lives depicting game.

He was born in Rome. He was the brother of the controversial antiquarian and numismatist, Francesco Martinetti (1833–1895). Sometime around the year 1870, Angelo donated to the Louvre Museum a club quite similar to the one depicted in the Farnese Hercules statue. This donation was undertaken through the mediation of Count Konstanty Tyszkiewicz of the Polish-Lithuanian Commonwealth. He exhibited paintings of game in many exhibitions, including at Turin in 1880 and at Rome in 1883. In 1882, the art gallery on Duke Street, St James's received some still life paintings from Angelo, which they said were "full of vivid color and imitative quality".
