= George Le Brunn =

Musical artist (1863–1905)

- Born: George Frederick Brunn; 20 June 1863; Brighton, Sussex, England
- Died: 18 December 1905 (aged 42) Brixton, London, England
- Genre: Music hall
- Occupation: Songwriter
- Years active: 1883-1905

George Le Brunn (born George Frederick Brunn; 20 June 1863 – 18 December 1905) was an English composer of popular songs, active during the heyday of the music halls.

== Biography ==
He was born in Brighton, Sussex, and was educated privately, studying music, piano and violin. He started using the surname "Le Brunn", thinking that it would help him be taken seriously as a musician, and played piano in theatre orchestras and music halls in London and elsewhere in the late 1870s and early 1880s.

From 1883, he worked full-time as a songwriter, at first with Harry Adams, before establishing a working partnership lasting for over twenty years with lyricist John P. Harrington. Their songs included "The Seven Ages of Man" (sung by Charles Godfrey, 1888) and "Ev'rything In The Garden's Lovely!" (1894; popularised by Marie Lloyd). Harrington said of Le Brunn: "I have worked with a number of famous composers of popular songs... but, without fear of contradiction, I boldly assert that George Le Brunn was the daddy of them all... George could compose songs as easily and deftly as another man might write a letter... Some of our most popular songs were composed in ten or fifteen minutes...".

Le Brunn also worked successfully with other lyricists. With W. T. Lytton, he wrote "When You Wink the Other Eye" (1890), which helped launch Marie Lloyd's career. In 1892, he wrote "Oh! Mr Porter" with his brother Thomas Le Brunn (1864–1936), included in the repertoires of Marie Lloyd and Norah Blaney. He also wrote, with Edgar Bateman, two songs made successful by Gus Elen, "If it Wasn’t for the 'Ouses in Between" (1894) and "It's a Great Big Shame" (1895). Bateman described Le Brunn as "a writer whose remarkable gift of melody is equalled by but few, and whose fertility of invention is equalled by none."

In 1905, George Le Brunn died of meningitis in Brixton, London, aged 42, and was buried in Lambeth Cemetery. Because of copyright theft, his widow was left almost penniless. His fellow composer Leslie Stuart wrote that Le Brunn was "...the most prolific popular melodist of his time. His songs are being sung in every corner of the earth and he has probably had more current songs in prominence than any living composer. Through the monstrous depradations of the music pirate, he died in financial difficulties." A benefit concert was arranged to help his family, which raised £600, of which Marie Lloyd contributed 100 guineas.
