= Grand Order of Water Rats =

British entertainment industry organisation

- GOWR
- Founded: 1889; 137 years ago London, England
- Type: Professional and service
- Affiliation: Independent
- Status: Active
- Emphasis: Show business charity
- Scope: National
- Motto: "Philanthropy, Conviviality, and Social Intercourse"
- Member badge
- Publication: The Trap
- Chapters: 1
- Nickname: Rats
- Headquarters: The Water Rats public house in Gray's Inn Road; London WC1; United Kingdom
- Website: www.gowr.net

The Grand Order of Water Rats is a British entertainment industry fraternity and charitable organisation based in London. Founded in 1889 by the music hall comedians Joe Elvin and Jack Lotto, the order is known for its high-profile, all male membership and benevolent works (primarily within the performing arts). Its sister organisation is The Grand Order of Lady Ratlings, which includes female performers and family members.

== History ==
Founder Joe Elvin c. 1890

In 1889, two British music hall performers, Joe Elvin and Jack Lotto, owned a trotting pony called "Magpie". As the pony was a regular race winner, its owners decided that they would use the profits to help performers who were less fortunate than themselves.

One day, as Elvin was driving the pony back to its stables in the pouring rain, a passing bus driver called out, "Wot yer got there, mate?" "Our trotting pony!" replied Elvin. Observing the bedraggled, soaked condition of the pony, the driver shouted back, "Trotting pony? Looks more like a bleedin' water rat!" As Rats spelled backward is Star, and vole, another name for a water rat, is an anagram of love, the name was deemed appropriate for the Order's agenda of Brotherly Love.

The Water Rats originally held meetings in Sunbury-on-Thames in a public house called The Magpie. Their headquarters is now at The Water Rats pub in Gray's Inn Road in Kings Cross, London. The order "is the most famous show business brotherhood and charity organisation in the world".

== Symbols ==
The name Water Rats was selected because "rats" spelled backward is "star", and vole, another name for a water rat, is an anagram of love, the name was deemed appropriate for the Order's agenda of brotherly love. Its motto Is "Philanthropy, conviviality, and social intercourse".

Members are called Rats. They wear a small gold emblem shaped like a water rat on the left lapel of their jackets, and if one Water Rat meets another who is not wearing his emblem he is fined, with the money going to charity. Magician David Nixon wore his while appearing on television, explaining that as current King Rat, he could be fined by any other member who saw him on screen without it.

The head of the organization is called the King Rat. The official publication of the Grand Order of Water Rats is The Trap.

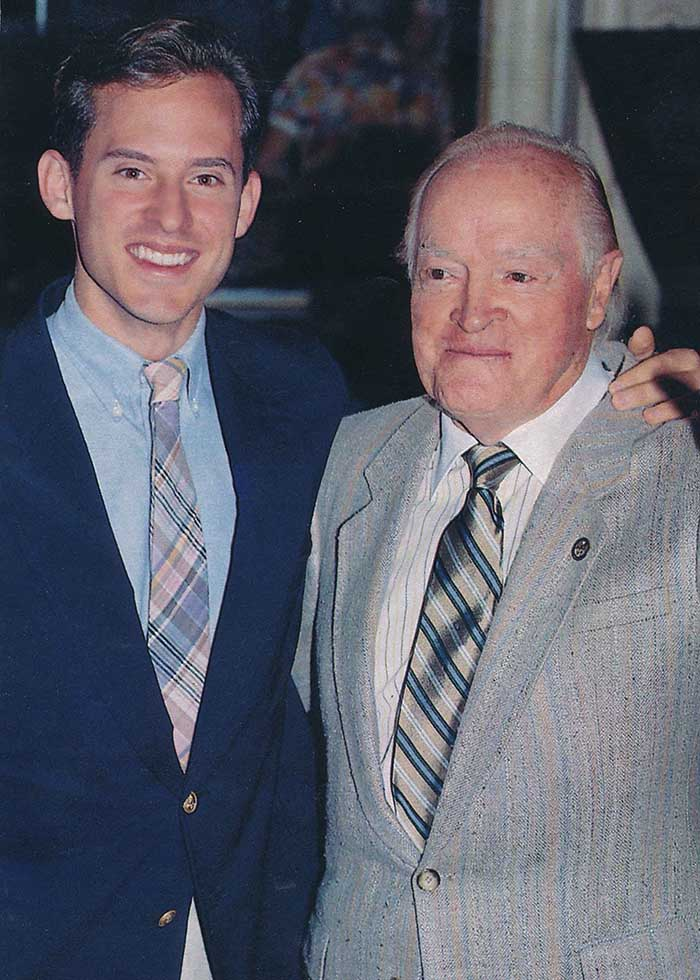
Newly inaugurated Bob Hope (right) emerges from ceremonies at the Hilton in London alongside grandson Zachary Hope – August 1991

== Activities ==
The order raises money by organising shows, lunches, dinners, and other events. Its objectives of the charity are "to assist members of the theatrical profession, or their dependents, who, due to illness or old age are in need". When possible additional funds raised go to a diverse range of charities and good causes including hospitals, health charities, and benevolent funds.

== Membership ==
Membership is limited to 180 male members of the entertainment industry plus 20 Companion Rats. Some Water Rats are household names, but many are not; all must be respected and trusted by their peers. Joining the Order is a complicated process that involves finding a proposer and seconder within the Order, consideration by the Order's Grand Council, and finally, a vote, which needs a large majority for success.

A member of the public can become a Friend of the Water Rats. There are also a small number of Companion Rats, distinguished men from various fields of business and influence who are not performers but who have achieved recognition for their support and friendship of the Order. These include Bob Potter, the late Prince Philip, Duke of Edinburgh, King Charles III and Prince Michael of Kent.

== Grand Order of Lady Ratlings ==
The Grand Order of Lady Ratlings (GOLR), a sister organisation for female performers and wives, sisters, and daughters of male performers, was established in 1929, when Fred Russell was King Rat of the GOWR. His wife, Lillian Russell, was installed as the first Queen Ratling. From 1965, membership was restricted to "recognised performers, those directly connected with the theatrical profession, wives of Water Rats and Companion Rats". In 1931, Minnie O'Farrell, the wife of Talbot O'Farrell, initiated the Cup of Kindness, which subsequently became a recognised charity.

== Notable members ==
=== King Rats ===
The first King Rat, who is the head of the charity, was the music hall singer Harry Freeman. The comedian Dan Leno joined in 1890 and was King Rat in 1891, 1892 and 1897. The post is usually held for one year.

Previous King Rats include:

- 1890 Harry Freeman
- 1891 Dan Leno
- 1892 Dan Leno
- 1893 Wal Pink
- 1894 Joe Elvin
- 1895 J. W. Cragg
- 1896 Eugene Stratton
- 1897 Dan Leno
- 1898 Joe O'Gorman
- 1899 Paul Martinetti
- 1900 Eugene Stratton
- 1901 Joe O'Gorman
- 1902 Wal Pink
- 1903 Fred Russell
- 1904 Tom McNaughton
- 1905 Arthur Reece
- 1906 Little Tich
- 1907 J. Allison
- 1908 W. H. Clemart
- 1909 Fred Ginnett
- 1910 C. Warren
- 1911 Harry Tate
- 1912 Charles Austin
- 1913 Charles Austin
- 1914 Fred Russell
- 1915 William Bankier
- 1916 Lew Lake
- 1917 Lew Lake
- 1918 Charles Austin
- 1919 William Bankier
- 1920 Deane Tribune
- 1921 George D'Albert

World Upheaval – Lodge suspended until 1927

- 1927 Charles Austin
- 1928 Charles Austin
- 1929 Fred Russell
- 1930 Talbot O'Farrell
- 1931 Will Hay
- 1932 Charles Austin
- 1933 Joe Morrison
- 1934 Will Fyffe
- 1935 Marriott Edgar
- 1936 George Wood
- 1937 Stanley Damerell
- 1938 Fred Miller
- 1939 Fred Russell
- 1940 Will Hay
- 1941 John Sharman
- 1942 George Jackley
- 1943 Tom Moss
- 1944 George Doonan
- 1945 Bud Flanagan
- 1946 Teddy Brown (died) / Bud Flanagan
- 1947 Robb Wilton
- 1948 Albert Whelan
- 1949 Ted Ray
- 1950 Ted Ray
- 1951 Bud Flanagan
- 1952 Charlie Chester
- 1953 Ben Warriss
- 1954 George Elrick
- 1955 Tommy Trinder
- 1956 Dave O'Gorman
- 1957 Cyril Dowler
- 1958 Clarkson Rose
- 1959 Johnny Riscoe
- 1960 Arthur Scott
- 1961 Ben Warriss
- 1962 Ben Warriss
- 1963 Tommy Trinder
- 1964 Ted Ray
- 1965 Tommy Trinder
- 1966 Arthur Haynes
- 1967 Terry Cantor
- 1968 Frankie Vaughan
- 1969 Harry Seltzer
- 1970 Phil Hindin
- 1971 George Martin
- 1972 Albert Stevenson
- 1973 George Elrick
- 1974 Cyril Dowler
- 1975 Joe Church
- 1976 David Nixon
- 1977 David Nixon
- 1978 Donald Ross
- 1979 David Berglas
- 1980 Henry Cooper
- 1981 Declan Cluskey
- 1982 Charlie Smithers
- 1983 Len Lowe
- 1984 Davy Kaye
- 1985 Les Dawson
- 1986 Alan Freeman
- 1987 Danny La Rue
- 1988 Bernard Bresslaw
- 1989 Roy Hudd
- 1990 David Lodge
- 1991 Wyn Calvin
- 1992 Bert Weedon
- 1993 John Inman
- 1994 Roger De Courcey
- 1995 Paul Daniels
- 1996 Paul Daniels
- 1997 Alf Pearson
- 1998 Frankie Vaughan
- 1999 Gorden Kaye
- 2000 Roy Hudd
- 2001 Don Smoothey
- 2002 Keith Simmons
- 2003 Chas McDevitt
- 2004 Chas McDevitt
- 2005 Melvyn Hayes
- 2006 Kaplan Kaye
- 2007 Kaplan Kaye
- 2008 Kaplan Kaye
- 2009 Graham Cole
- 2010 Derek Martin
- 2011 Keith Simmons
- 2012 Joe Pasquale
- 2013 Jess Conrad
- 2014 Rick Wakeman
- 2015 Rick Wakeman
- 2016 Ian Richards
- 2017 Ian Richards
- 2018 Adger Brown
- 2019 Nicholas Parsons
- 2020 Duggie Brown
- 2021 Duggie Brown
- 2022 Duggie Brown
- 2023 Chris Emmett
- 2024 Richard Gauntlett
- 2025 Richard Gauntlett
- 2026 Bob Bevan
