= Joe Elvin =

British comedian (1862–1935)

Elvin in 1890

Joe Elvin (born Joseph Peter Keegan; 29 November 1862 – 3 March 1935) was an English comedian and music hall entertainer and a Founder of the Grand Order of Water Rats, a show business charity. With other leading performers he took part in the Music Hall War of 1907, which supported less well paid music hall artistes in their strike for better pay and conditions.

== Biography ==
Elvin was the son of Joseph Peter Keegan (1840 – 1901), an actor and music-hall artiste, and his wife, Annie Delaney. He was educated at a Catholic school in Tottenham Court Road while at the same time receiving tuition in dancing and other performance skills. He made his début in pantomime at Brighton's Theatre Royal in 1871 and began his music-hall career the following year as a juvenile comic and clog dancer at Crowder's in Greenwich. He appeared with his father as 'Joe Keegan and Little Elvin', their first real success being Poor Jo which was based on Dickens's Bleak House. During a season for the vaudeville entrepreneur Tony Pastor in New York City in 1882 they turned to more comic material.

== Comedy career ==
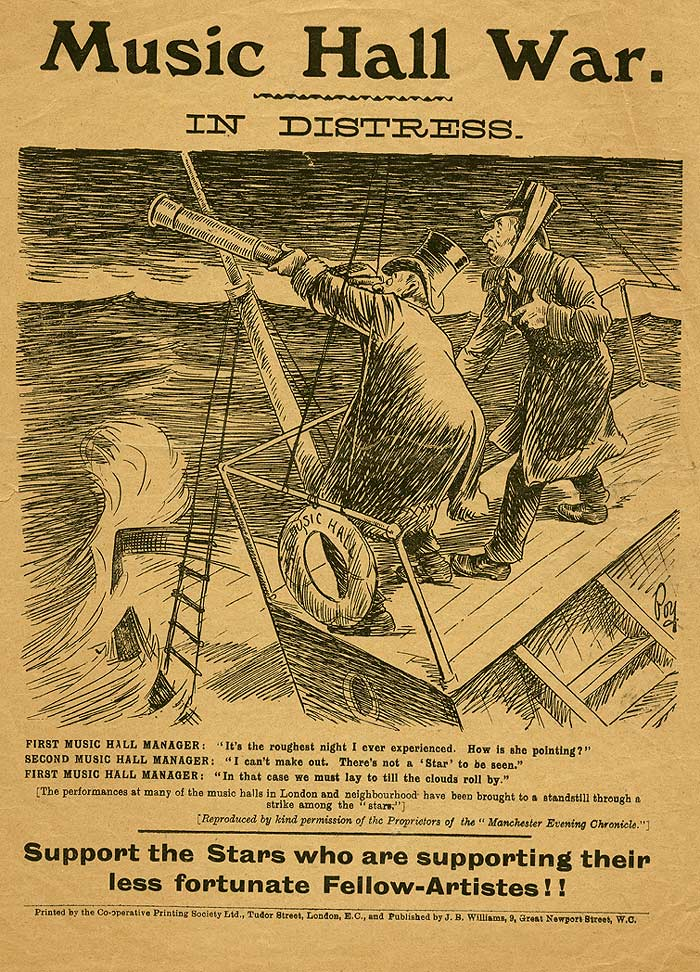
1907 poster from the Music Hall War between artists and theatre managers

Impresario Fred Karno described Elvin as one of a handful of physical comedians who "made significant changes in music-hall fare." Elvin developed the character of the loud, lovable, and irreverent cockney working man having a good time. With Marie Dainton, Marie Lloyd and Little Tich, Elvin was a leading force behind the 'Music Hall War' of 1907 when they persuaded other less well paid music hall artistes to strike for better pay and conditions and to picket the theatres that broke the strike. This action led to the formation of the 'Variety Artists Federation' (VAF), which decades later was absorbed into Equity.

In December 1907 he helped found and became the first president of the Variety Artistes Benevolent Fund, which was set up by performers to replace a previous society (founded by Elvin's father) which had been controlled largely by agents and managers. In 1909 Elvin was the prime mover in a scheme that eventually caused Brinsworth Home to be built for retired music-hall performers.

Elvin was the brother of variety artiste Frank Keegan, who died in 1951. The two frequently appeared together as 'Keegan and Elvin', including at the 1887 variety performance benefit for Charles Ash at the Royal Victoria Hall in Lambeth. His wife, Charlotte Keegan, was also a variety artist, performing as Mrs Joe Elvin. She died on September 8, 1916.

== Grand Order of Water Rats ==
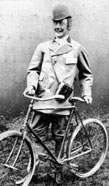
Joe Elvin on a tobacco card of 1901

In 1889 Elvin was a founder with Jack Lotto of the Grand Order of Water Rats, a show business charity which began life when a betting syndicate that had grown up around a trotting pony owned by Elvin agreed to donate any winnings to charity, gaining its name when someone referred to the pony during a rainy trip to the Derby as looking more like a water rat. Elvin served as 'King Rat' in 1894.

His interests included his extensive charitable and benevolent work and a lifelong interest in horse-racing, as owner, spectator, and keen gambler. He retired in the early 1920s and a benefit concert was held for him at the London Palladium in March 1923.

He appeared in the 1900 silent film The Rats.

Elvin is buried in Bandon Hill Cemetery in Wallington in Surrey beside his friends and fellow music hall artistes Eugene Stratton and Jack Lotto.
