= Charles Godfrey (entertainer) =

English music hall entertainer

- Sheet music c. 1890
- Born: Paul Lacey; 26 April 1854; Southwark, London, England
- Died: May 1900 (aged 46); Brierley Hill, Staffordshire, England
- Occupation: Music hall entertainer
- Years active: 1870s–1900

Charles Godfrey (born Paul Lacey, 26 April 1854 – May 1900), was an English music hall entertainer, described by Henry Chance Newton as "one of the most phenomenally successful artistes ever seen in the British music halls". Another writer described him as "a first-class actor with an outstandingly good baritone voice, plus a highly developed flair for the dramatic."

== Biography ==
Born in Southwark, he was a waiter at the Surrey Theatre before becoming a stage actor in melodramas. His earliest success was a dramatic sketch, "On Guard" in 1880, written by Harry Adams. In this, Godfrey first sang a song, "Here Upon Guard Am I", about the Battle of Balaclava while dressed in full military uniform. After a break in which the theatre orchestra played "Rule, Britannia!", he returned to the stage in the guise of an elderly tramp, to deliver a monologue saying that he was no longer wanted by society, before dying in a snowstorm. Chance Newton said that "Godfrey's vigorous acting of the neglected old soldier... raised vast audiences to an almost incredible pitch of enthusiasm...". Historian Jeffrey Richards says that "the appeal of the sketch was the classic combination of melodrama, sentimentality and patriotism." Godfrey continued to perform the sketch to audiences around the country through the 1880s.

Godfrey performed a varied range of other songs and monologues, including "The Masher King", written and composed by Harry Adams and Edward Jonghmans, and first performed in 1884; a "masher" was a slang term for a dissolute dandy of the type who frequented music halls. Another successful song by Godfrey was "Hi-Tiddley-Hi-Ti" (1890), with lyrics by E. W. Rogers and music by George Le Brunn. Somewhat in contrast was his patriotic 1893 monologue "Fighting with the Seventh Royal Fusiliers", written by Le Brunn with words by Wal Pink recounting an incident supposed to have happened at the Battle of Inkerman. According to General Sir Ian Hamilton, the song generated "an overwhelming rush of recruits" such that "recruiting for the regiment had to be closed for a year." Another well-received song was "It's the English Speaking Race Against the World". Godfrey's performances also included portraits of such British heroes as Francis Drake, Admiral Nelson, the Duke of Wellington and General Gordon. Promoted by Harry Rickards, Godfrey toured in Australia and New Zealand.

Godfrey was known to be a heavy drinker, which undermined his health. He died in 1900, aged 46, at Brierley Hill, Staffordshire, while undertaking a tour of theatres in the Birmingham area. His wife had predeceased him, dying in Melbourne, Australia, when he was touring there.
