= Variety Artistes' Federation =

Former trade union of the United Kingdom

- Merged into: Equity
- Founded: 1906
- Dissolved: 1966
- Headquarters: 18 Charing Cross Road, London
- Location: United Kingdom
- Members: 4,000 (1906)
- Publication: The Performer
- Affiliations: TUC, IFVA

The Variety Artistes' Federation (VAF) was a trade union representing variety performers in the United Kingdom.

== History ==
The union was founded on 18 February 1906, after discussions between the show business social club and charity the Grand Order of Water Rats (GOWR); the Music Hall Artists Railway Association, which negotiated concessions on rail fares for travelling performers; and the Terriers, another club for variety performers. It was formed in response to grievances by performers that some managers expected them to perform matinées, as well as two evening performances six days a week, without any additional payment, and that some performers were having to make long journeys without notice because of changes to schedules.

Within weeks the union had 4,000 members. It launched a weekly newspaper, The Performer, and in early 1907 staged its first industrial action, which became known as the Music Hall Strike. After some members were locked out of theatres controlled by Walter Gibbons, twenty-two London theatres were picketed, with around half of the VAF members standing on picket lines. It raised funds by organising a performance at the Scala Theatre, its members working without pay. It agreed to arbitration, chaired by George Askwith, and this proved a success for the union, which reached national agreements on codes of conduct, contracts and dispute resolution.

Membership of the union peaked at over 5,600 in 1920, but more than halved over the next decade. It campaigned against "ex-enemy aliens" from Germany being allowed to work in British music halls after the First World War, and also had a strained relationship with the Actors' Association, the forerunner of Equity. In the 1930s, it also campaigned for its members not to broadcast on radio, on the grounds that it would "shorten the life of [the performer's] material [and] lessen the value of his act as a going concern".

By 1966, the VAF had about 2,000 members. That year, it merged into the British Actors' Equity Association.

== General Secretaries ==
1906: Charles Gulliver
1907: Monte Bayly
1908:
1909: W. H. Clemart
1910: J. E. Barry
1910s: Fred Herbert
1927: Monte Bayly
1929: A. V. Drewe
Lewis Lee
1950: W. C. Bass
1953: Frank J. Comerford
1954: Reginald Swinson

== See also ==
- American Guild of Variety Artists
- Danish Artist Union
