= Enrique Gil Guerra =

Spanish painter and advertising illustrator (1912–1996)

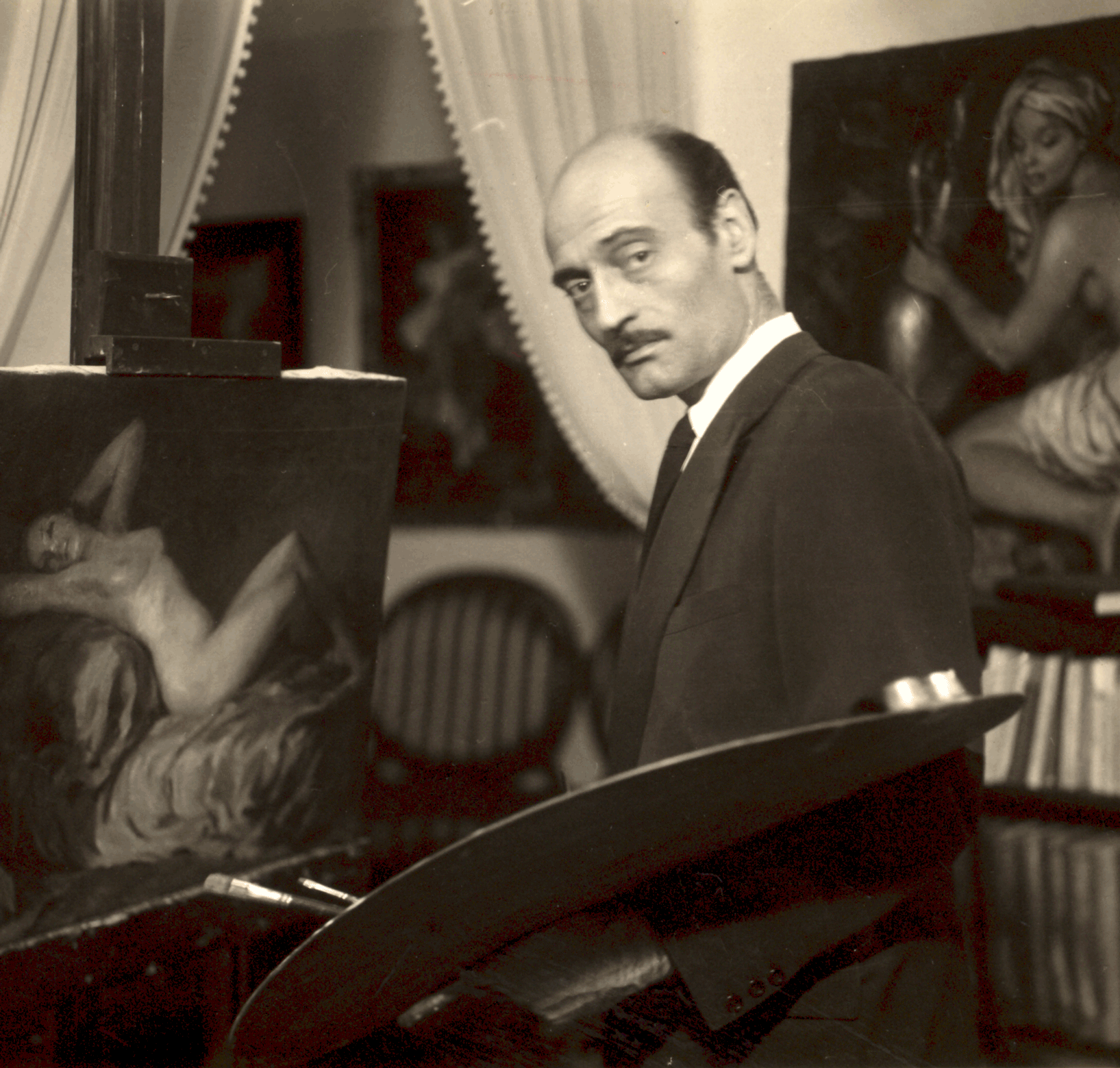
- Gil Guerra, c. 1940
- Born: 20 July 1912; Madrid, Spain
- Died: 1 March 1996 (aged 83); Madrid, Spain
- Education: Royal Academy of Fine Arts of San Fernando
- Known for: Painting, advertising illustration
- Movement: Costumbrismo, realism

Enrique Gil Guerra (20 July 1912 – 1 March 1996) was a Spanish costumbrista painter, drawing teacher and advertising illustrator. A pupil of Manuel Benedito- himself a disciple of Joaquín Sorolla- at the San Fernando School in Madrid, he combined easel painting with a long teaching career and, under the pen name "Nike", a prolific body of advertising work. He created the long-running image of Anís de la Asturiana, which appeared on the back page of the newspaper ABC for almost fifty years (1950–1998), one of the longest-lived campaigns in Spanish advertising.

== Biography ==
Gil Guerra was orphaned of his father at the age of three and boarded at the San Ildefonso orphans' school in Madrid. In 1927, aged fifteen, he entered the San Fernando School of Painting, Sculpture and Engraving, graduating in 1932, where he became a pupil of Manuel Benedito. Under Benedito he also began teaching, a vocation he kept for the rest of his life. In 1936 he passed the competitive examination for secondary-school professor of Painting and Drawing, but the Spanish Civil War prevented him from collecting the diploma.

After the war he developed three parallel careers: painting, teaching and advertising. From 1942 he taught at the Madrid School of Arts and Crafts (Escuela de Artes y Oficios) until his retirement in 1982, and worked from his own studio in oil painting throughout his life.

== Painting ==
His work belongs to early-20th-century realism, evolving toward impressionism from the 1970s. He cultivated Spanish costumbrista subjects—Andalusian scenes, Roma women, flamenco, portraits and landscapes. Between 1934 and 1992 his oils were acquired by galleries and private collectors in the United States, Canada, Colombia, Venezuela, Chile, Sweden, France, England, Belgium, Japan and Spain. His painting Espiga Rota is held in the collection of Unión de Explosivos Río Tinto.

== Advertising ("Nike") ==
Under the pen name "Nike", Gil Guerra worked for nearly fifty years with the Madrid agency Valeriano Pérez (later Hijos de Valeriano Pérez). His best-known work is the image of Anís de la Asturiana, published on the back page of ABC for almost fifty years (1950–1998).

== Awards ==
- 1950 and 1951: First Prize, Vendimia Festival poster competition, Jerez de la Frontera
- 1953: Medal of Honour, 1st International Crafts Exhibition
- 1970: Unión de Explosivos prize for Espiga Rota
