= Carlos Vázquez =

Carlos Vázquez may refer to:

- Carlos Alberto Vázquez, Argentine cyclist
- Cavafe (Carlos Alberto Vázquez Fernández), Cuban footballer
- Carlos Vázquez Úbeda, Spanish painter
