= Cléo de Mérode =

French dancer (1875–1966)

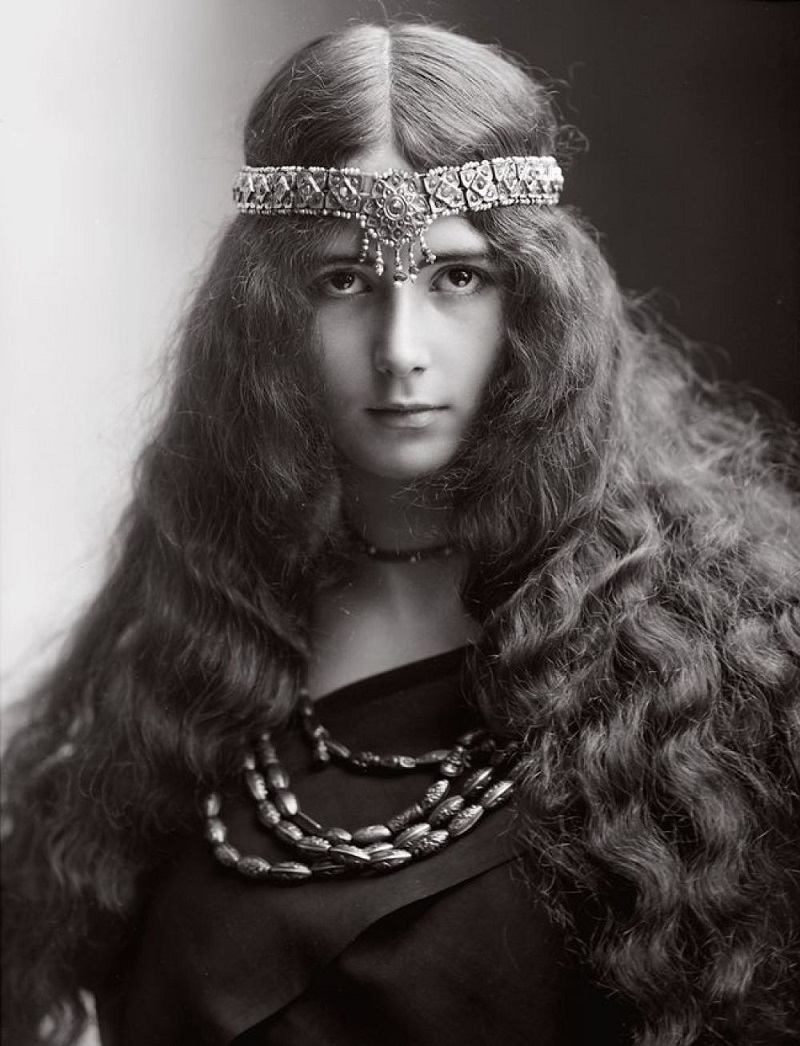
- Cléo de Mérode by Nadar, 1895
- Born: Cléopâtre-Diane de Mérode; 27 September 1875; Paris, French Third Republic
- Died: 17 October 1966 (aged 91); Paris, France
- Resting place: Père Lachaise Cemetery
- Occupation: Dancer
- Years active: 1886–1924, 1934

Signature
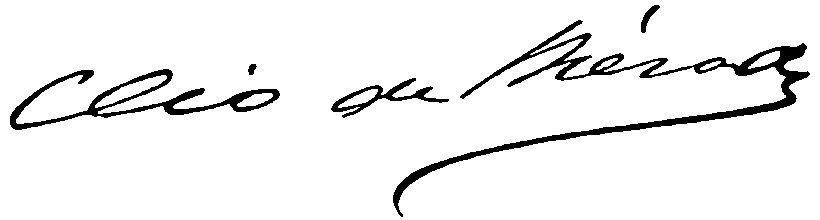

Cléopâtre-Diane de Mérode (27 September 1875 – 17 October 1966) was a French dancer of the Belle Époque. She has been referred to as the "first real celebrity icon" and the "first modern celebrity". She was also the first woman whose photographic image, due in particular to photographers Nadar and Léopold-Émile Reutlinger, was distributed worldwide. Her actual height was 168 cm (approximately 5 feet 6 inches).

== Biography ==
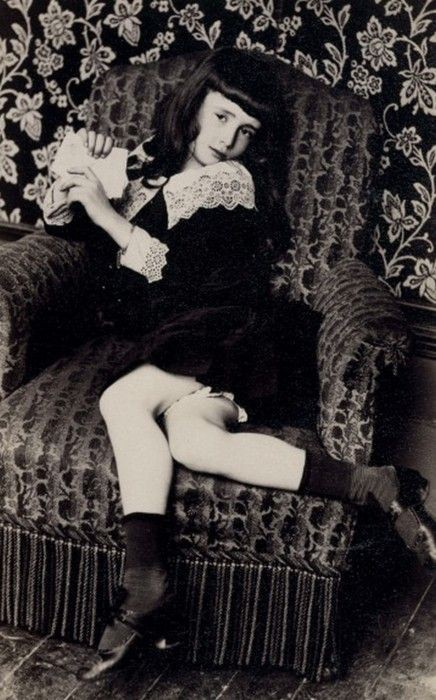
Cléo de Mérode photographed as a child, c. 1880s

Cléo de Mérode was born in Paris at 19:00 hours on 27 September 1875. She was the illegitimate daughter of Viennese Baroness Vincentia Maria Cäcilia Catharina de Mérode (1850–1899). Vincentia was estranged from Cléo's father, who was the Austrian judge, lawyer, and pioneer of tourism Theodor Christomannos. Through Christomannos's marriage to Aloysia Wellzensohn, she had three half-siblings. Cléo met her father as a young adult at a railway station in Merano, and upon seeing him jokingly exclaimed, "I really hope that you are wealthy, because I am used to luxury and the good life." Upon Christomannos' death in 1911, de Mérode left an inscription on his grave in German which reads, "The man who wanted everything for others and nothing for himself". She was brought up as a Roman Catholic, but only during her early life, not as a serious religion, and was affectionately called "Lulu" by her family. But after her mother's death, she lived as an Atheist. At the age of eight, she was sent to study dance with the Sisters of Saint-Vincent-de-Paul, and she made her professional debut at the Paris Opéra at age eleven. According to a 1964 interview with Cecil Beaton, she became a dancer because she was fond of music.

de Mérode wearing her famous chignon hairstyle, 1903

De Mérode became renowned for her glamour even more than for her dancing skills, and her image began appearing on items such as postcards and playing cards. At age 16, she introduced her signature hairstyle, a chignon, which became the talk of Parisian women and was quickly adopted as a popular style for all. In Sweden, the hairstyle nearly instigated a strike against female workers when they were ordered to cease wearing the chignon to work. The hairstyle persisted in popularity for decades; as late as 1941, American newspapers called it the "Cléo de Mérode hairdo". At the same time, the hairstyle, which covered her ears, caused rumours to circulate that de Mérode was missing one or both of her ears. She responded to the rumours by going out in public the following day with her ears exposed. de Mérode later said of the trendsetting hairstyle, "It wasn't thought out at all; it just happened. As a child I wore a square fringe. This would fall in my eyes when I was a coryphée at the Opéra ballet, and I kept pushing it back from the centre; gradually the hair grew and, in order to keep it from falling forward, I knotted it in a bun. When big hats came in it was difficult to fix them on without padding, but I invented a little hidden crown." In 1895, Henri de Toulouse-Lautrec painted her portrait, as would Charles Puyo, Alfredo Müller, Edgar Degas, Manuel Benedito, Georges Clairin, Friedrich August von Kaulbach (who painted her twice), József Rippl-Rónai, François Flameng, Carlos Vázquez Úbeda, Einar Nerman, Paul-Eugène Mesplès, Henri Gervex, and Giovanni Boldini. She was sculpted by artists such as Alexandre Falguière (who sculpted her twice), Mariano Benlliure, Alphonse Mucha, Ernst Seger, and Eugène-Denis Arrondelle. A sculpture of her made by an anonymous artist can be found at the Galerie Tourbillon, and a wax mask of her by Georges Despret is preserved at the Musée Fin-de-Siècle Museum in Brussels. Georges Goursat also drew several caricatures of de Mérode during the 1900s. Her picture was taken by some of the most illustrious photographers of the day, including Nadar and his son and successor Paul Nadar, Léopold-Émile Reutlinger and his son Jean Reutlinger, Charles Ogerau, Henri Manuel, and Otto Sarony.

In the autumn of 1895, a rumour began that de Mérode was King Leopold II's latest mistress, and the two were dubbed "Cléopold" by the media. Because the King had had two children with a woman reputed to be a prostitute, de Mérode's reputation suffered, and she was labelled a "courtesan" or "demimondaine", both of which she is still referred to as today. In an attempt to scotch the rumours, de Mérode's mother wrote a letter to the editor of Le Figaro, which was published and then subsequently ridiculed due to poor spelling. Two years later, her mother said in an interview, "It is false, absolutely false. His Majesty has no idea of doing such a ridiculous thing. When Lulu was dancing at the Grand Opera - where, you know, she must report every night, because she is not a premiere at all, and has no favours granted her which other members of the corps do not also receive - it happened that one night His Majesty the King of the Belgians and his suite were at the opera. The royal party sat very near the stage in one of the avant scenes. His Majesty the King sent to my daughter a flattering message, telling how much pleasure she had given him, and asked if he might beg the favour of meeting her. My daughter met the King, but never in her life except in my presence." In the same interview, de Mérode added, "It is horrible that they should so pursue me with such monstrous lies! The King of the Belgians is no more to me than any other great man who has admired me on the stage, whom I have seen for a few moments off the stage very rarely, and always in the presence of many other persons. His Majesty sent me gifts. I have no hesitation in saying that I accepted them, but that is permissible for an artist in France. I have never accepted any attentions from the King of Belgium, and he has never received a favour from me which I could not accord to any gentleman under the circumstances. I have never been alone with him." However, the French agent Xavier Paoli recorded in his 1911 book Their Majesties as I Knew Them that the King claimed that he had never met nor seen de Mérode perform and was unsure of how the rumours began. When he finally met de Mérode after the rumours were already rife, he apologised to her: "Allow me to express my regrets," he told her, "if the good fortune people attribute to me has offended you at all. Alas, we no longer live in an age when a king's favour was not looked upon as compromising! Besides, I am only a minor king." In her autobiography, de Mérode wrote of the rumour: "I was completely bewildered by the dimensions that this story took on. The tale of my liaison with Léopold sped along, across France, throughout Europe, and around the world. Caricatures, gossip columns, songs, skits, showed the king and me, snuggling, sharing a restaurant table, cracking open champagne at Maxim's, on a cruise, in a Pullman, and so on....I did not know what to make of such inordinate publicity; it stunned me." According to Georg Stefan Troller, who interviewed her, Leopold II had promised her the Belgian Congo if she married him. Michael Garval, de Mérode's biographer, claims that the rumours began after the King accosted de Mérode in the Foyer de la Danse at the Paris Opéra, and that the King may have staged the affair to conceal his actual relations with Émilienne d'Alençon. Garval has also said that although de Mérode posed as a courtesan to increase her fame, she never worked as one.

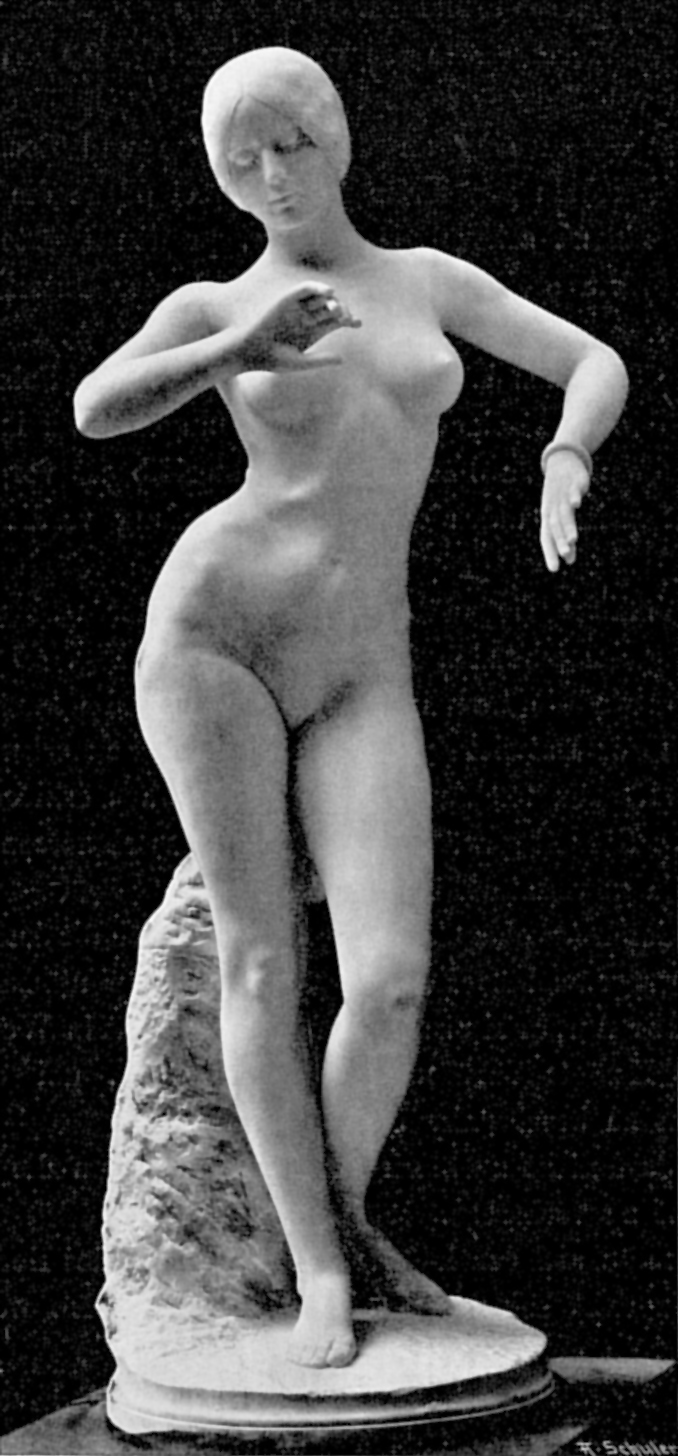
La Danseuse by Alexandre Falguière, 1896. The sculpture was carved from a plaster cast of de Mérode's body, which caused significant controversy at the time.

In the spring of 1896, a second scandal erupted due to the exhibition of the sculpture La Danseuse by Alexandre Falguière at the Salon des Artistes Française. The sculpture was a life-size nude in white marble that was carved out of a plaster cast of de Mérode's body. Despite the grain of skin visible on the plaster, proving it a genuine cast, de Mérode accused Falguière of having fabricated a scandalous work by moulding the body of the statue onto another female model, although she had posed only for the head. The scandal followed her throughout her career; almost a decade later, in 1904, The Sketch wrote, "Cléo de Mérode is, of course, well known because of her beauty and the Falguière statue, and not on account of her quality as dancer, which is not remarkable." Although de Mérode vehemently denied posing for the sculpture, she later incorporated the work into a stage production in which she starred. The sculpture can be seen at the Musée d'Orsay.

In the summer of 1896, de Mérode appeared in a simulated nude scene in the title role of Phryné, a three act ballet-pantomime staged at the Casino Municipal in the seaside resort of Royan. She later recalled, "I appeared before the jury enveloped in dark greyish-blue drapery. I danced in this costume and my gestures made the long folds of fabric undulate in an attractive manner. Underneath I wore a pale rose maillot, covered with a light rose gauze tunic, which clung to my form. When the moment came to seduce the judges, a follower, with one gesture, raised the immense cape and spread it behind me to its full extent. Against this somewhat dark background, I was a pink silhouette, and from a distance, with a certain suspension of disbelief on the part of the audience, the flesh-coloured feminine form gave the illusion of a nude body." That year she was also elected “Beauty Queen” by 3,000 out of 7,000 votes by readers of L'Illustration. She obtained almost 1,000 votes more than other celebrated names, including Sarah Bernhardt and Gabrielle Réjane.

Despite the two scandals, de Mérode became an international star, performing across Europe and in the United States. In Germany, she danced at Hamburg's Hansa-Theater and Berlin's Wintergarten, and in France she appeared in the plays Les Deux Pigeons, La Korrigane, and Étoile, and Gustave Charpentier engaged her for the role of La Beauté in Le Couronnement de la Muse. In 1897, she arrived in New York City, where she appeared for a month at Koster and Bial's in the play Faust. During her stay in New York, she was besieged by reporters and followed down the street by girls begging for her autograph. de Mérode's performance was heavily anticipated, but was disappointing, and though the press praised her beauty, they said she could not dance; Munsey's Magazine said of her, "Cléo de Mérode can go back to her inconspicuous position among the ballet dancers at the Paris Opéra, crowned with the distinction of having made the most successful failure of the season. Critics and public joined in a chorus of disappointment after her first appearance at Koster & Bial's, and yet she has set a new fashion in personal adornment, crowds mark her progress on the street, and large audiences assemble to see her." de Mérode responded to the criticism by saying, "The papers stated that I was a failure, but they lied. I pleased the Americans vastly. The papers pretended that I danced badly, as if Americans could tell. They know nothing about dancing and don't like ballets." In a separate interview she stated, "I dance the traditional dances, the Louis XIII, the Louis XV, the gavotte, the pavane, the minuet, and I led Ganne's ballet Phrynne at Royan Louis. I am gowned by a real dressmaker. I know music very well and play the piano as little as possible. I know how to arrange a basket of fruit, place flowers in a jardiniere, and touch a book without spoiling it. I have read the poets and the historians, and I do not write. I wear stockings that are as fine as a woven mist. What other accomplishments shall I speak of?" Although she criticised American culture, she celebrated American women, noting, "It would be outrageous not to admire the women of America. They are not like us. It is too bad for them that they are not French, but that cannot be helped. They know much more than we do and have ambitions in many directions that we in our country never feel. I think as a whole they are prettier than we are. I do not wonder that the men from Europe fall in love with the American girls. They are so chic and charming, you know. I have heard so many stories of them that at first, I did not know what to think, and when I walked about on the great steamer that brought me here, I looked at your countrywomen very curiously. The more I looked the better I liked them. Perhaps it was because they seemed to like me, but that does not matter. My opinion of them is all that I could wish and that is saying a great deal, for I wish to speak and think everything kindly of the women of America." Despite the letdown, de Mérode made over forty times her regular monthly Parisian salary, which drew criticism, resulting in de Mérode being dismissed as an "article de Paris" – alluring, but worthless.

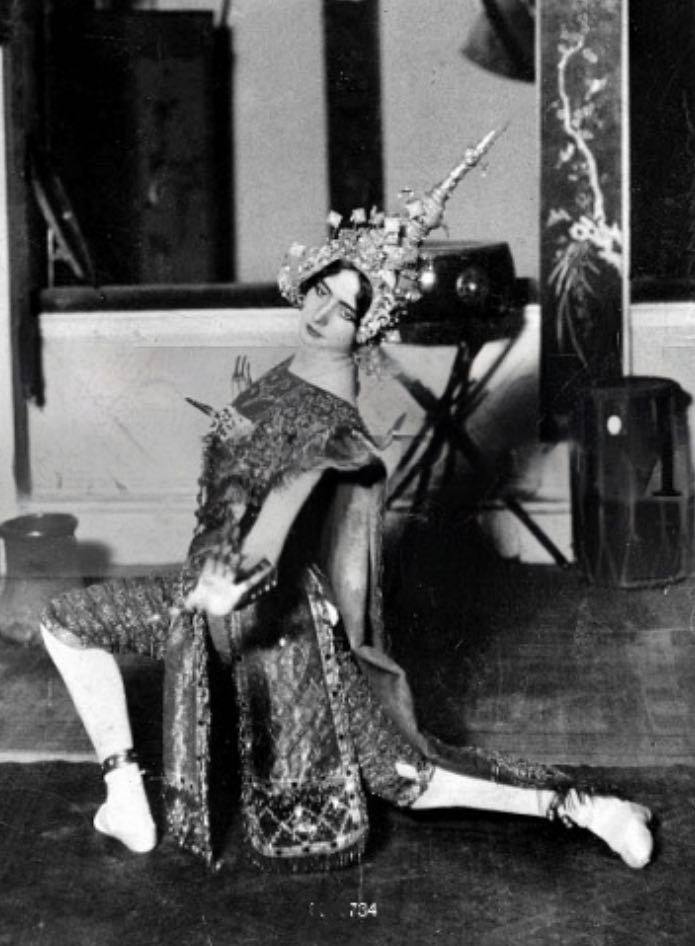
de Mérode dancing in a traditional Khmer costume at the Exposition Universelle in 1900

In 1898, de Mérode was awarded first prize at an exhibit of the New York Camera Club as being the most beautiful woman in Paris. In 1900, she caused a sensation at the Exposition Universelle when she performed traditional Javanese and Khmer dances. She also appeared in two films, one of which was hand-tinted in color; both showed her dancing. In 1901, Édouard Marchand arranged for her to dance at the Folies Bergère in a three-act pantomime titled Lorenza, taking the risk to do something other elites of the ballet had never done before. Her performance gained her a new following, and her popularity further increased. In 1902, de Mérode performed at the Alhambra in London, where her performance was not well received. In contrast, she was popular in Sweden, Denmark, and Norway, visiting there in 1903 and 1904. In Stockholm, crowds in the street would prevent her from returning to her hotel. Upon returning to Paris, de Mérode turned over 3,000 love letters from her German and Scandinavian admirers to the editor of Le Figaro, many of which were subsequently printed. In 1904, she reprised her role as Phryne at the Olympia. That same year, she performed alongside dancer Paul Franck in Tanagra, a dance in Ancient Greek style. During her stay in Munich from 1903 to 1904, she was the model for the painters Friedrich August von Kaulbach and Franz von Lenbach. In 1906, it was reported that 50,000,000 photographs of de Mérode had been sold and that a single Berlin firm produced 4,000,000 a year. The following year, Everybody's Magazine compared her to the Virgin Mary. Jean Cocteau called her the "Belle of the beautiful ones" and wrote of her, "She is the beauty of beauty, the virgin who is not, the Pre-Raphaelite lady who walks with downcast eyes through groups [...] The profile of Cléo is so graceful, so divine that the cartoonists break it."

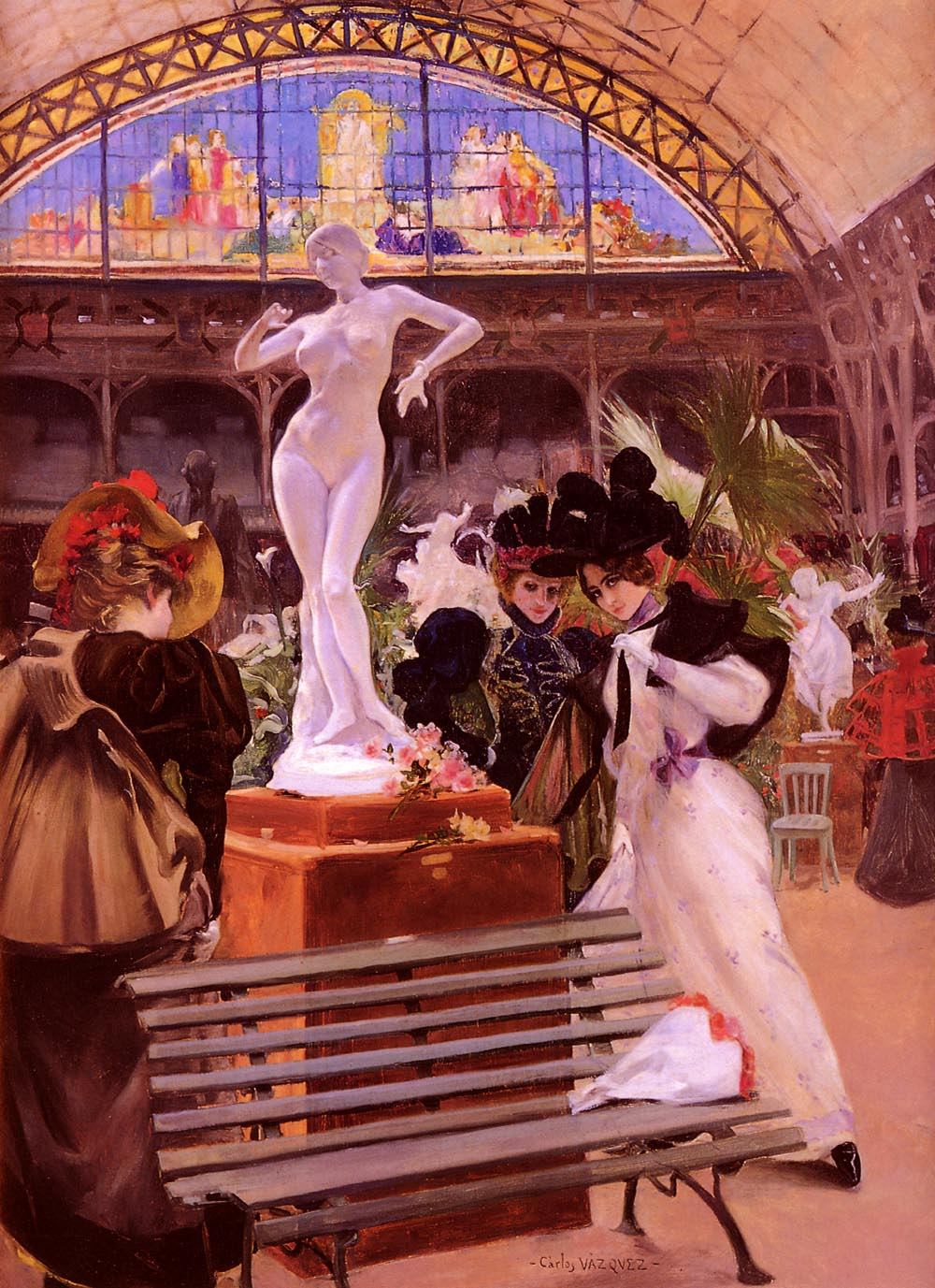
Cléo de Mérode and the infamous Falguière sculpture depicted in a painting by Carlos Vázquez Úbeda

In 1908 she danced for the German Emperor Wilhelm II, and portrayed Phoébe in Endymion et Phoébe at the Opéra-Comique alongside Régina Badet. In 1912, de Mérode appeared in the opera La Danseuse de Pompeii as part of the corps de ballet at the Opéra-Comique. The following year in late June, she appeared in the revue Come Over Here at the London Opera House. During World War I, she entertained wounded soldiers. After the war ended, she toured in the French provinces with Serge Peretti, reluctant to accept engagements abroad. She continued to dance until her late forties; Rupert Doone's partnering of de Mérode in a 1924 social dance recital reportedly inspired Frederick Ashton to pursue a career in dance. Throughout the early 1920s, de Mérode performed at galas and benefit concerts, the earliest being a fundraiser for Benoît-Constant Coquelin old actors' home in Couilly-Pont-aux-Dames. de Mérode retired in 1924 to the seaside resort of Biarritz in the Pyrénées-Atlantiques département of France. She also spent time at the Château de Rastignac with the Lauwick family. At the request of theater director Henri Varna, she reappeared on stage at the Alcazar on 15 June 1934 in Viens poupoule alongside the dancer George Skibine and the actress and singer Cassive. She did four routines: one in a Norman peasant costume, the traditional Khmer dance she had first performed at the Exposition Universelle in 1900, a Second Empire scene, and "la Valse 1900". de Mérode later reflected, “I was wearing a pink satin dress, boned at the waist, very long, with a ruching at the bottom. We danced five waltzes in a row; we ended with a big whirlwind, and Skibine carried me in his arms to the back of the stage.” She then taught ballet before retiring in 1965 at 90 years old. As a hobby, she crafted figurines of dancers, shepherds, and shepherdesses in the classical style which she then sold.

In 1923, de Mérode unsuccessfully sued the owners of the film Peacock Alley (1922) for 100,000 francs in damages, alleging that the film injured her reputation by burlesquing incidents in her career.

In 1950, de Mérode sued Simone de Beauvoir for libel, claiming five million francs in damages. de Beauvoir had "wrongly described her as a prostitute who came from peasant stock and had taken an aristocratic sounding stage name as self promotion" in her book The Second Sex. de Mérode won the lawsuit, and the passage was taken out of the book. However, de Mérode only received one franc in damages because "the judge found that Cléo had permitted the rumors during the course of her career for their publicity value".

In 1955, she published her autobiography, Le Ballet de ma vie (The Dance of My Life).

In 1964, de Mérode was photographed by Cecil Beaton and featured in the 15 February 1964 issue of Vogue.

de Mérode never married or had children, which has led some biographers to categorize her as a lesbian. Paul Klee, who personally knew de Mérode, called her "probably the most beautiful woman alive" and said she "seemed asexual" in a 1902 diary entry. The French novelist Félicien Champsaur reportedly became obsessed with de Mérode and proposed marriage to her multiple times. In her autobiography Le ballet de ma vie, de Mérode claimed that she had only been involved with two men in her life. She was engaged to a French aristocrat for nearly ten years before he died of Typhoid fever in 1904, and she was the companion of the Spanish sculptor and diplomat Luis de Périnat, Marquis de Périnat from 1906 to 1919. He left her for Spanish Baroness Ana Maria Elío y Gaztelu, with whom he had a son. In an 1897 interview, de Mérode spoke of her engagement to her French aristocrat fiancé, saying, "I am going to get married. First, because the man seems good to me, and also because, you know, in France a woman is never independent until she is married. You see, I have my mother with me wherever I go. What would they think of me if I went about without a chaperone? Impossible. Do you think Monsieur whom I shall marry would be happy if he thought I were over here in this great country with no one but my little self to keep away the people that always follow me? No, no, no." In the same interview, she proclaimed that her greatest love was dance, remarking, "My soul is in my feet sometimes I think. I know the dance, I know the figure, but some way I forget it all and leave it to my feet. They know. They never make mistakes. How long shall I dance? As long as I live and can move about. I do not wish to be thought one of those women who will ever confess that they are passe. I never shall be, never." de Mérode was close friends with the musician Reynaldo Hahn, who she met when she was seventeen. She lived with her mother in an apartment in Paris until her mother's death in 1899.

She was a vegetarian.

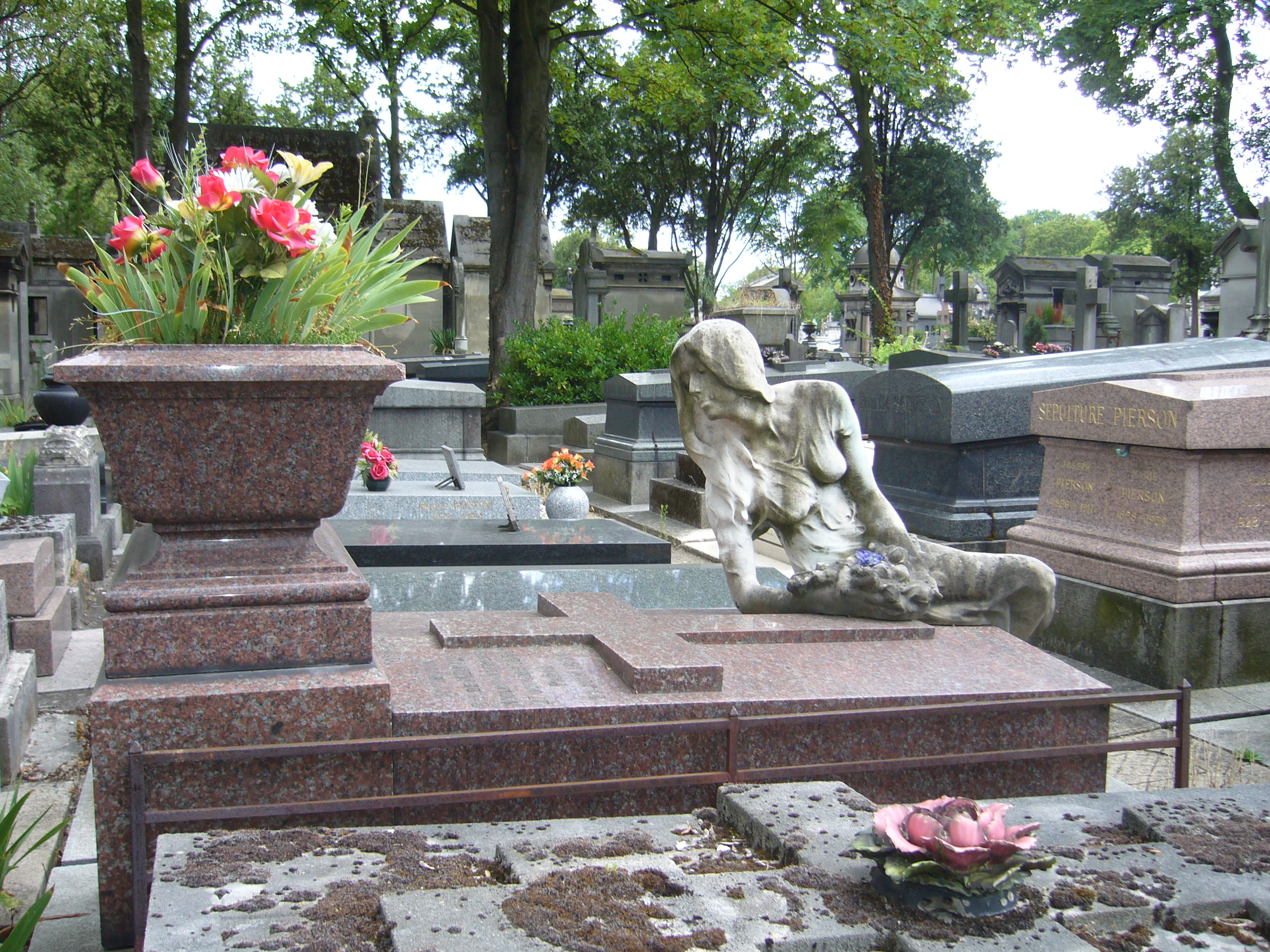
de Mérode's grave at Père Lachaise

Suffering from dementia, de Mérode died on 17 October 1966 in her Paris apartment at 15 Rue de Téhéran, and was interred at Père Lachaise Cemetery in Division 90. A statue of her by Luis de Périnat, mourning her mother, who is interred in the same plot, decorates the gravestone.

== In popular culture ==
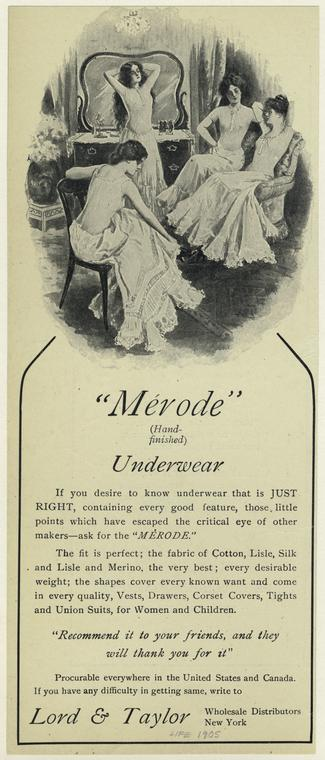
A 1905 advertisement for Mérode underwear, which was named after Cléo de Mérode

In 1896, de Mérode was featured in The American Tobacco Company's Sweet Caporal brand pinback series of celebrated actresses. More de Mérode-themed items followed, including a nightgown, artificial flowers, cigars, and underwear; the latter two sold for decades.

The 1897 French operetta Les Fêtards parodied de Mérode and King Leopold II's rumored affair, with their names being changed to Théa and Ernest III. The musical comedy The Rounders, on Broadway and on tour nationwide from 1899 to 1900, was based on Les Fêtards, and the character of Théa was portrayed by Phyllis Rankin.

In December 1897, Koster and Bial's traveling company presented "The Big Burlesque Extravaganza 'Gayest Manhattan'" at the Taylor Opera House in Trenton, New Jersey, which featured Gertie Reynolds as "The American Cléo de Mérode".

In May 1900, the John P. Dousman Milling Co. of De Pere released a blotter calendar with de Mérode's photograph on it. The following year, Gimbels and Palais Royal released a line of Cléo de Mérode dolls, complete with clothing and accessories.

Liane de Pougy's 1904 novel, Les Sensations de Mlle de la Bringue, places de Mérode and King Leopold II at a sabbath; she refers to de Mérode as "Méo de la Clef", who "personified love without making it" and calls King Leopold II "a grand old man with a white beard, her devoted eunuch".

In 1918, she was played by Dorothy Newall in the musical revue Hitchy-Koo. The following year, a comic character named after de Mérode appeared in the operetta Sì. In 1921 she appeared as a romance novel heroine in Karl Reissmann's novel A Dancer's Dream of Joy. She is mentioned in Henry William Fischer's 1922 book Abroad with Mark Twain and Eugene Field.

The character "Cleo of Paris", played by Mae Murray in the 1922 American silent film Peacock Alley, was a parody of de Mérode. She was portrayed by Fern Andra in the lost German silent film Women of Passion (1926). Upon learning of the film and its portrayal of her as a courtesan, she protested in an open letter in the theatrical daily Comœdia, saying, "I lead and have always led the quietest of lives, I do not seek any publicity, and I really do not wish to be given any against my will, especially that sort of publicity." The character Lea de Castro (played by Saffron Burrows) in the Austrian art-house film Klimt (2006) is based on de Mérode. The film focuses on an imaginary romance between the artist Gustav Klimt and Lea de Castro, a Parisian dancer. The character was supposed to be named after de Mérode, but was changed to Lea de Castro – a riff on Laetitia Casta, who was originally supposed to portray her, and Cléo de Mérode. In reality, de Mérode and Klimt never met or had an affair, and de Mérode was not one of his art subjects or muses.

In 1940, artist and filmmaker Joseph Cornell constructed a glass-fronted shadow box dedicated to de Mérode called, "L’Egypte de Mlle. Cléo de Mérode". In 2011, Charles Simic published a poem about the box and de Mérode, which read, "Doll's forearm, loose red sand, wood ball, German coin, several glass and mirror fragments, 12 corkstopped bottles, cutout sphinx [sic] head, yellow filaments, 2 intertwined paper spirals, cut out of Cléo de Mérode's head, cutout of camels and men, loose yellow sand, 6 pearl beads, glass tube with residue of dried green liquid, crumpled tulle, rhinestones, pearl beads, sequins, metal chain, metal and glass fragments, threaded needle, red wood disc, bone and frosted glass fragments, blue celluloid, clear glass crystals, rock specimen, 7 balls, plastic rose petals, three miniature tin spoons for a dollhouse."

In the last decade, there has been a resurgence of interest in de Mérode. In 2011, Silvano Faggioni published a biography about de Mérode's father titled Theodor Christomannos: Brilliant pioneer of tourism in the Dolomites. In the book, Faggioni describes de Mérode and her father first meeting and her relationship with him as an adult; it is the first time de Mérode's father's identity was made public. The following year, Michael D. Garval published the book Cléo de Mérode and the Rise of Modern Celebrity Culture, which explores the legacy of de Mérode and studies the neglected prehistory of a visual culture populated by, and obsessed with, celebrities. In 2016, Aaron Jaffe and Jonathan Goldman reaffirmed this in their book Modernist Star Maps: Celebrity, Modernity, Culture. The following year, de Mérode was briefly mentioned in Edward Ross Dickinson's book Dancing in the Blood: Modern Dance and European Culture on the Eve of the First World War, which is about the impact of modern dance on European cultural life in the early twentieth century. In November 2019, Vogue Spain published an article about de Mérode's contribution to the celebrity phenomenon. In 2020, Greg Jenner published the book Dead Famous: An Unexpected History of Celebrity from Bronze Age to Silver Screen, which is about how instrumental modernity’s earlier technologies were in propelling celebrity culture, such as daily newspapers, and how the celebrity phenomenon has changed and stayed the same. The book briefly talks about de Mérode and her rise to fame. In January 2021, Alto Adige published an article about de Mérode's father Theodor Christomannos and touches on her relationship with him. In April 2021, Vanity Fair France wrote an article about de Mérode and King Leopold II's rumored affair.

== See also ==
- Women in dance

== Bibliography ==
- Cléo de Mérode, Le Ballet de ma vie, Paris, Pierre Horay, 1955, 277 p., ill.
- Christian Corvisier, Cléo de Mérode et la photographie, la première icône moderne, Paris, éditions du Patrimoine, 2007, 127 p., 150 ill.
- Cleo de Merode and the rise of modern celebrity culture, Choice Reviews Online Año:2013 vol.:50 iss:10 pág.:50 -50-5484
- The Last Symbolist Poet.(Art), Time, Hughes, Robert Año:1976 vol.:107 iss:10 pág.:74
- Acts of Containment: Marianne Moore, Joseph Cornell, and the Poetics of Enclosure, Journal of Modern Literature; Philadelphia, Falcetta, Jennie-Rebecca Año:2006 vol.:29 iss:4 pág.:124 -144
