= Mesplès =

Mesplès or Mesples is a French surname. Notable people with the surname include:

- Denis Mesples (born 1963), French equestrian
- Paul-Eugène Mesplès (1849–1924), French painter and musician
- Pierre Toussaint Marcel de Serres de Mesplès (1780–1862), French caver, geologist and naturalist

== See also ==
- Mesples, commune in France
- Mady Mesplé (1931–2020), French soprano opera singer
