= Édouard Marchand =

French theatre director

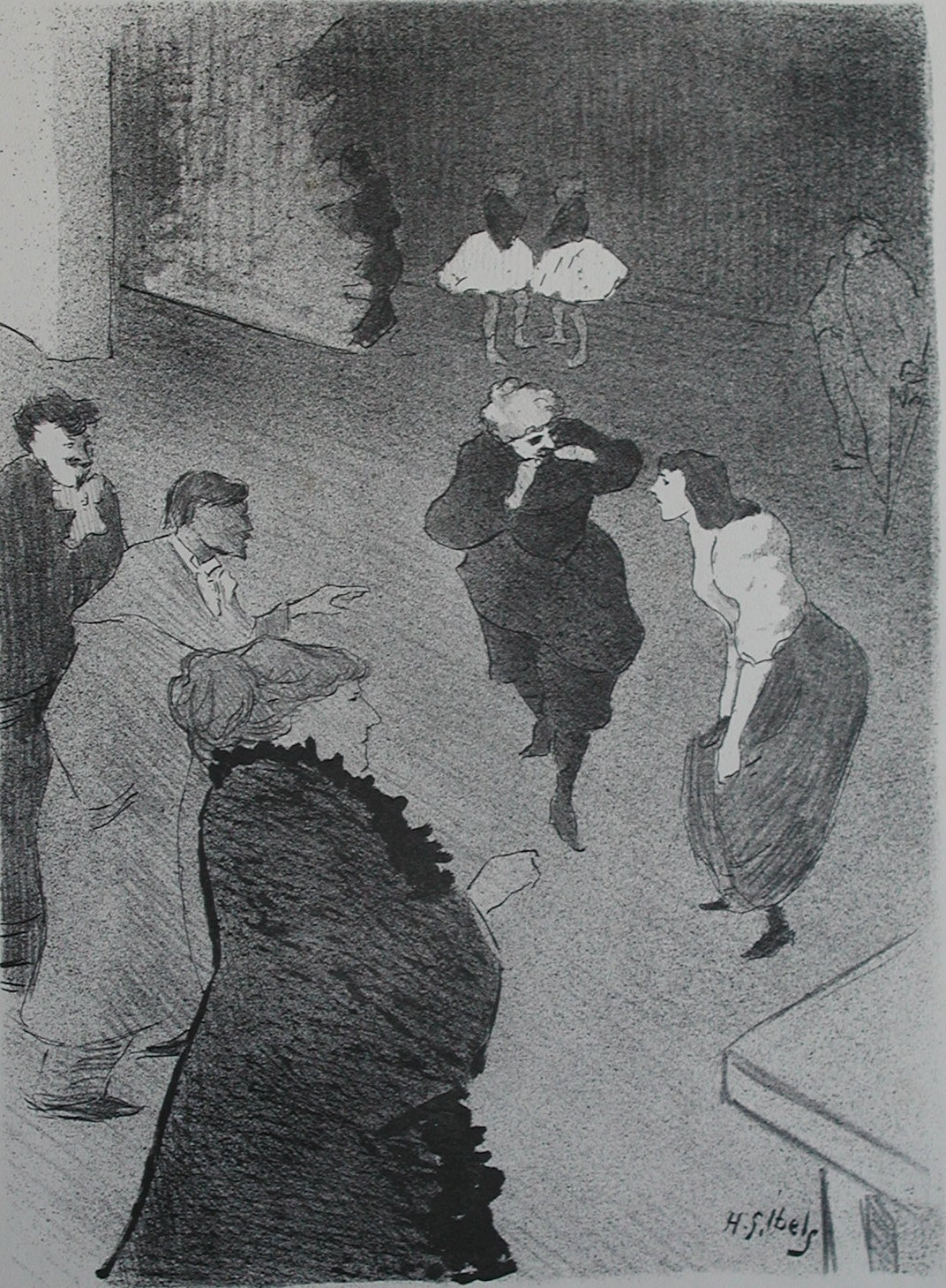
Rehearsal at the Folies Bergère under the direction of Édouard Marchand (1893)

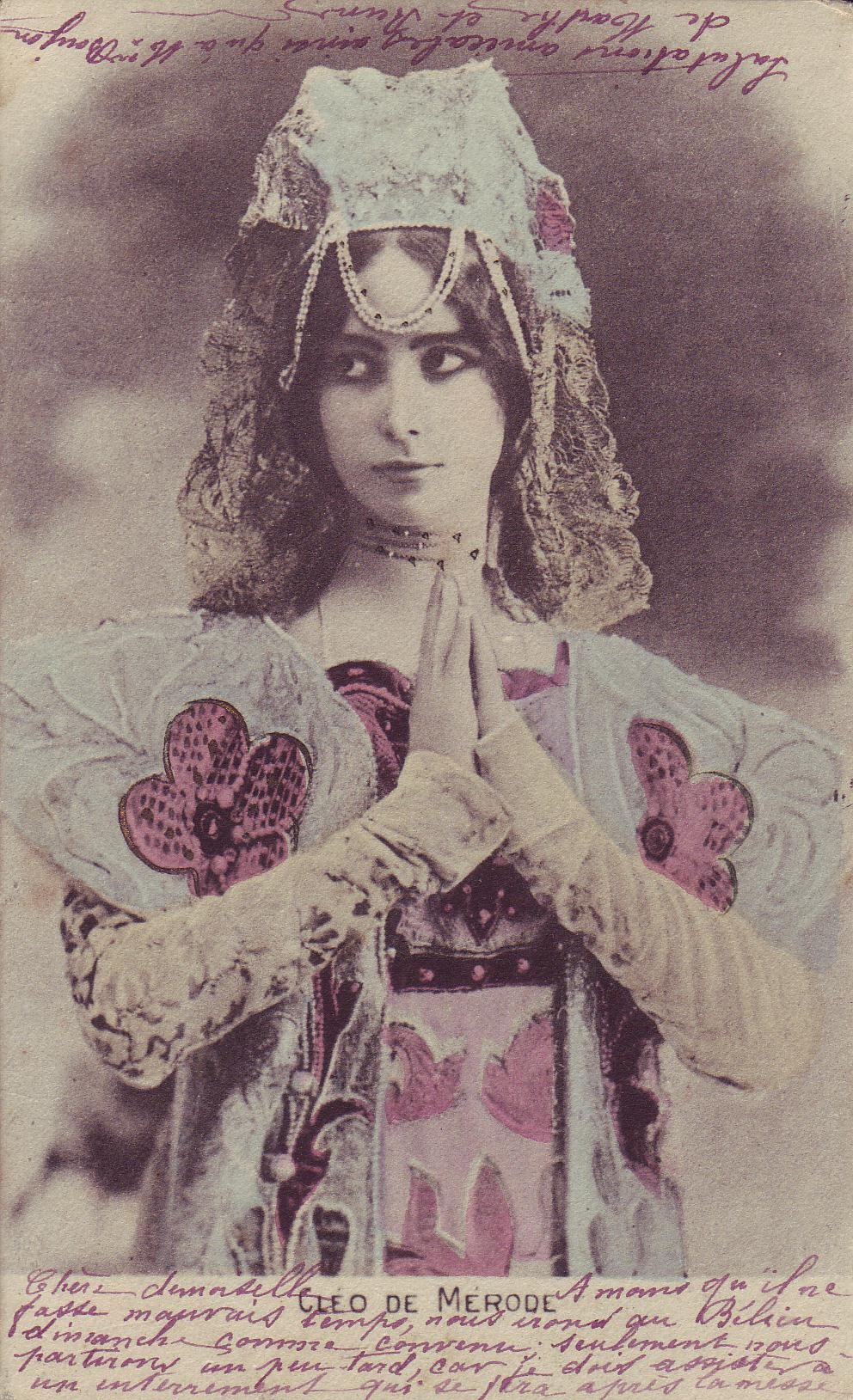
Cléo de Mérode and the Lorenza ballet at the Folies Bergère in 1901.

Jules Édouard Marchand (20 October 1859 – 8 February 1905) was a Parisian theatre director and artistic director in the second half of the 19th century, where he created the big show revues.

== Life ==
Born in Paris, Marchand was a show organizer and talent scout. He was responsible for the artistic creation of the big show revues. Marchand was a regular in theatres, cabarets and caf'conc'. He travelled the world in search of new talent. He became a personality of Parisian nights and a recognized artistic advisor.

Following the purchase of the Folies Bergère theatre by Mr and Mrs Allemand, they recruited Marchand as artistic director. Marchand later married their niece. They had a son, Léopold Marchand, born in 1891, who became a famous playwright and screenwriter.

In 1886, Marchand conceived a new kind of show, the music-hall revue. Marchand understood that women were at the heart of this new concept and would impose it on the Folies Bergère. Most of the stars of caf'conc' sang at the Folies Bergère: Paulus, Polin, Yvette Guilbert, Polaire and Gaby Deslys.

For sixteen years, Marchand directed many artists: the Frères Isola (illusionists), Nala Damajenti (snake charmer), the Zulu Troupe (real Zulus), the Burmese Family, the Kangaroo Boxer, the Stamboul Wrestlers, Tom Cannon (giant wrestler), Ira Paine (American gunfighter), Iron Jack (Hercules), Sampson (chain breaker), Captain George Costentenus (tattooed with three hundred and twenty animal figures), the Scheffers (acrobats), Cinquévalli (king of jugglers), the Living Paintings of the London Palace Theatre, Little Tich (English transformist dwarf), the Griffiths (clowns), Baggenssen (eccentric clown), the Barrison sisters, la Cavaliéri, la Tortojada, Caroline Otéro, Liane de Pougy, Émilienne d'Alençon, and Loïe Fuller.

On 7 April 1894, Marchand bought the Folies Bergère theatre from the Allemand couple. He also became director of the Eldorado theatre in Paris.

In 1895, Marchand staged the first major English-style music hall revue in France at the Scala (Paris) in Paris. All the great stars of the caf'conc' performed there: Polin, Yvette Guilbert, Fragson, Mayol, Polaire, Paulette Darty, Max Dearly, Mistinguett.

In 1901, he recruited the opera dancer, Cléo de Mérode for a pantomime ballet in three acts called Lorenza. This was the last major show he organised.

In 1902, illness forced Marchand to step down after 16 years of success. He negotiated his succession at a high price with the Isola Brothers, whom he himself had directed at the Folies Bergère.

Marchand died some time later in Paris at the age of 45.

== Productions ==
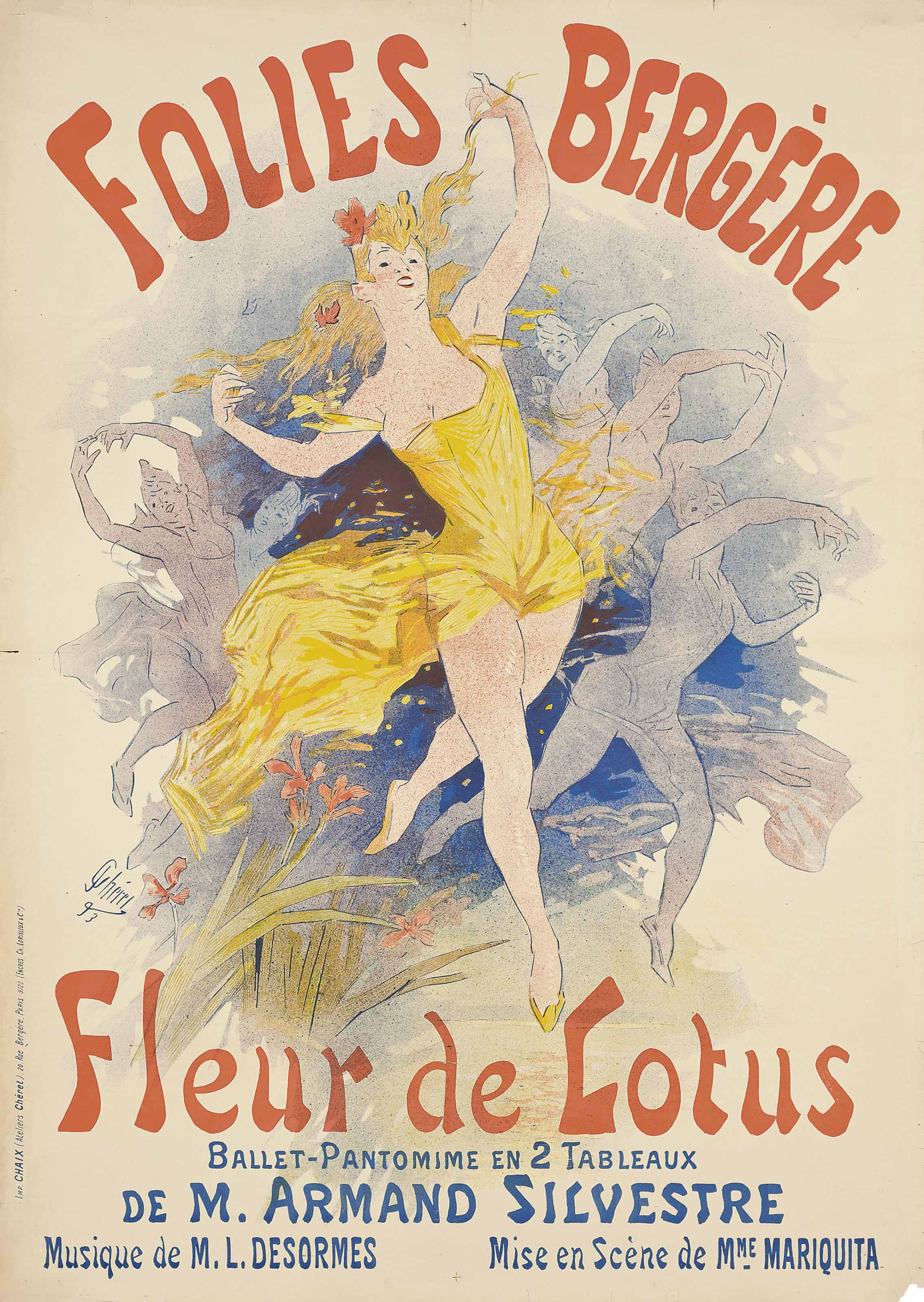
Fleur de Lotus (1893)

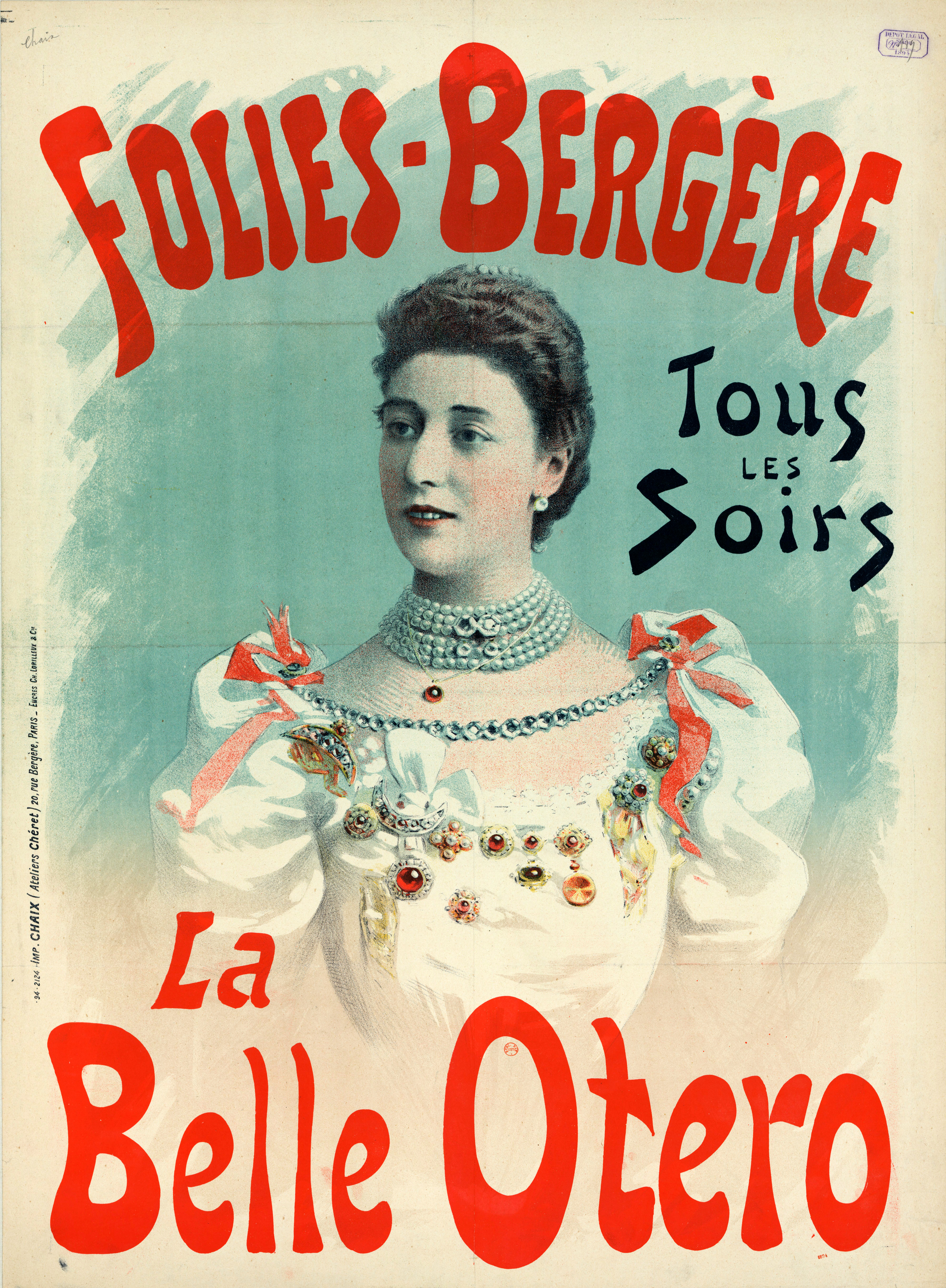
La Belle Otero (1894)

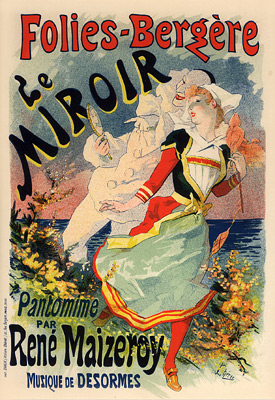
Le Miroir (1896-1900)

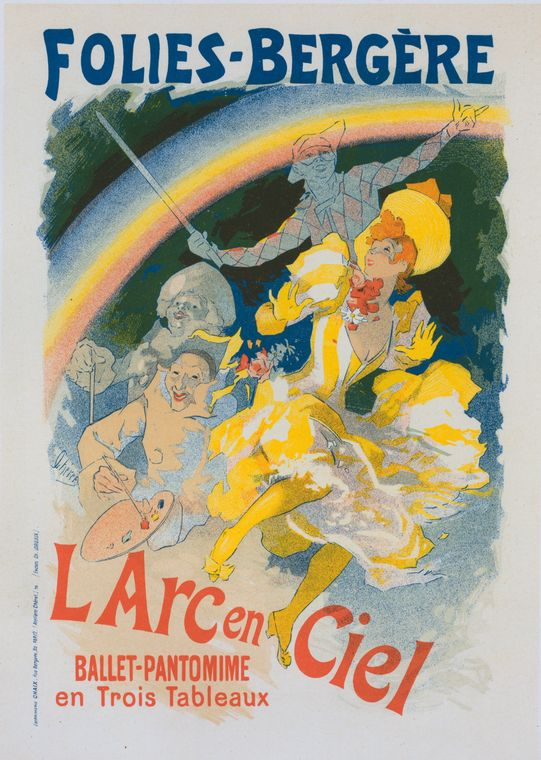
L'Arc en ciel (1896-1900)
Spectacle de Loïe Fuller

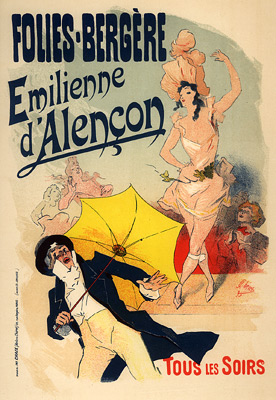
Spectacle dansant
d'Emilienne d'Alençon

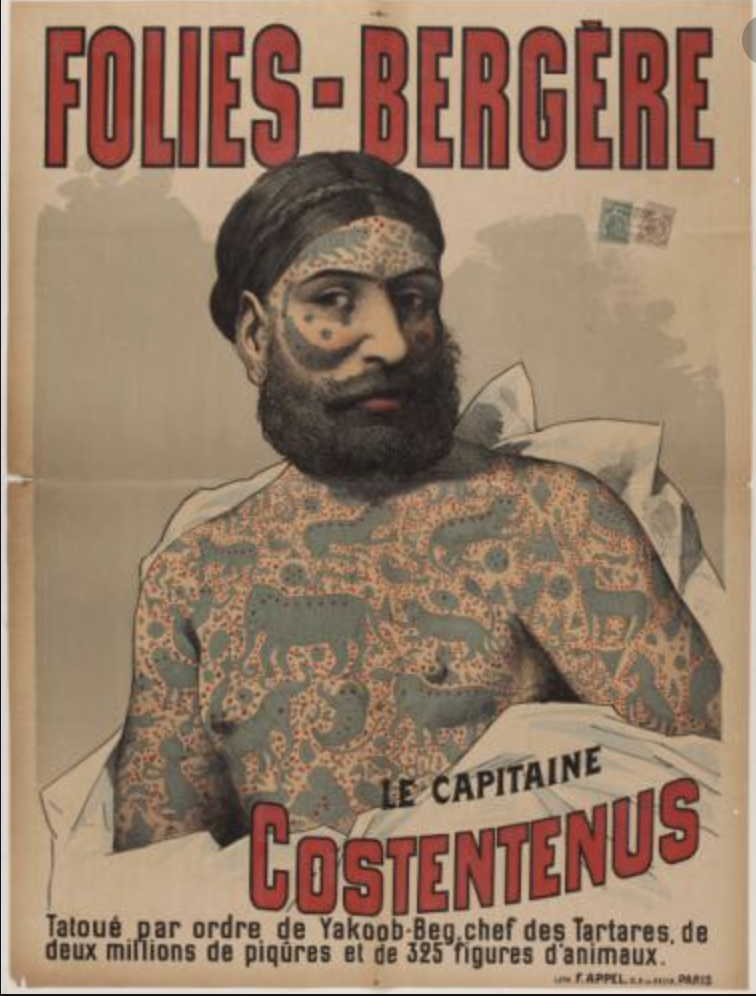
Le Capitaine George Costentenus (1889)
