= Little Tich =

English music hall comedian (1867–1928)

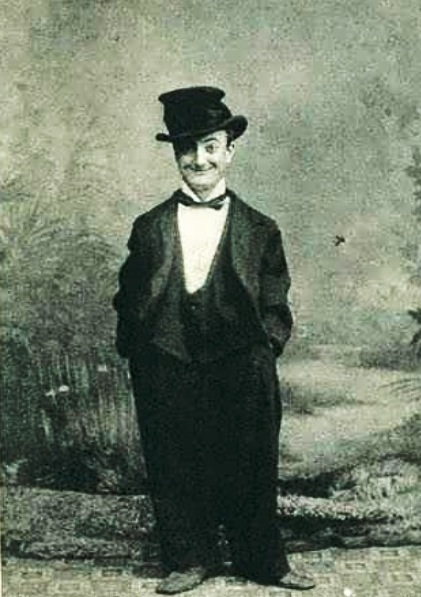
Little Tich in 1893

Harry Relph (21 July 1867 – 10 February 1928), professionally known as Little Tich, was a 4-foot-6-inch-tall (137 cm) English music hall comedian and dancer during the late 19th and early 20th centuries. He was best known for his acrobatic and comedic "Big-Boot Dance", which he performed in Europe and for which he wore boots with soles 28 inches (71 cm) long. Aside from his music hall appearances, he was also a popular performer in Christmas pantomimes and appeared in them annually at theatres throughout the English provinces. He repeated this success in London, where he appeared in three pantomimes at the Theatre Royal, Drury Lane, between 1891 and 1893 alongside Dan Leno and Marie Lloyd.

Born in Cudham, Kent, Little Tich began performing aged ten when he developed a dance and tin-whistle act which he showcased at public houses in Sevenoaks. In the early 1880s he formed a blackface act and gained popularity with performances at the nearby Rosherville Pleasure Gardens and Barnard's Music Hall in Chatham. He travelled to London and appeared at the Forester's Music Hall in 1884. Later that year, he adopted the stage name "Little Tich", which he based on his childhood nickname of "Tichborne", acquired through his portly stature and physical likeness to the suspected Tichborne Claimant Arthur Orton. The terms "titchy" or "titch" were later derived from "Little Tich" and are used to describe things that are small.

Little Tich's act further developed during a tour of the United States between 1887 and 1889 where he established the Big-Boot Dance and impressed audiences with his ability to stand on the tips of the shoes and to lean at extraordinary angles. In the 1890s he developed the Serpentine Dance and had a major success with the Christmas pantomime Babes in the Wood in Manchester during the 1889–90 season. In 1891, he was recruited by the impresario Augustus Harris to appear in that year's spectacular Theatre Royal, Drury Lane, Christmas pantomime Humpty Dumpty. He starred in a further two productions at the theatre including Little Bo Peep (1892) and Robinson Crusoe (1893).

Between 1896 and 1902 Little Tich performed in his own musical theatre company, and spent much of his time in Paris, where he became a popular variety artist. For his music hall acts, he created characters based on everyday observations. The characterisations used were "The Gas Inspector", "The Spanish Señora" and "The Waiter"; all three were later recorded onto shellac discs, of which he made twenty in total. He was married three times and fathered two children. In 1927 he suffered a stroke, which was partly triggered by a blow to the head which he had accidentally received during an evening performance at the Alhambra Theatre. He never recovered fully from the injury, and died the following year at his house in Hendon, aged 60.

== Biography ==
=== Family background and early life ===
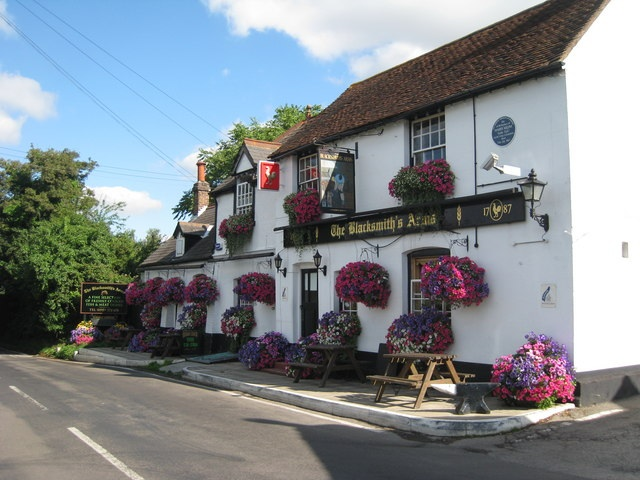
Blue plaque memorial at Little Tich's birthplace, the Blacksmith's Arms in Cudham

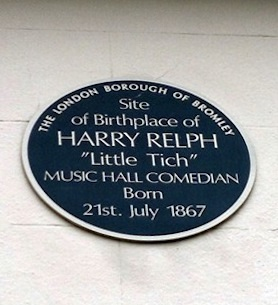

Little Tich was born Harry Relph in Cudham, Kent (now in the London Borough of Bromley). He was the last of eight children born to Richard Relph, a farmer and publican, and his wife Mary, née Moorefield. (Note: Mary's maiden name was recorded as Morphew on Little Tich's birth certificate, but was Moorefield on her death certificate. It is probable that the latter is correct, with his daughter Mary Tich blaming the confusion on her grandmother's broad Irish accent being misheard by the rural Kentish GRO clerk.) The Relph family were close and lived in relative affluence. Richard Relph was a committed family man and was known in the village for his sharp business acumen. His early wealth, which was attributed to a series of successful horse-trading deals, enabled him to purchase his first public house, the Rising Sun in Fawkham. In 1818 he married Sarah Ashenden and they had eight children; she died in 1845. In 1851 he moved to Cudham, bought the Blacksmith's Arms and an adjoining farm, and started a new family with Mary Moorefield, a nurse-maid governess from Dublin.

Little Tich was born with an extra digit on each hand, webbed from the little finger to the centre joint. He also experienced stunted growth. He reached 4 feet 6 inches (137 cm) in height by the age of ten, but grew no taller. His physical differences from other children caused him to become socially withdrawn and lonely. Nevertheless, his disabilities earned him fame and were an asset to his parents' business. Patrons would travel from neighbouring counties to witness his peculiarities, and the youngster revelled in the attention, dancing comically on his father's saloon bar to curious guests.

Little Tich was educated at Knockholt, a three-mile walk from Cudham. From an early age, he displayed considerable academic ability and also excelled in art; by the time he was five, his drawings were being sold to patrons of the Blacksmith's Arms by his father. Little Tich became interested in the travelling performers whom his father often employed to entertain guests at the inn. He would mimic the dancers, singers and conjurors, causing much amusement to both his family and his patrons. So good were his impersonations that his siblings frequently took him to neighbouring public houses where they would get him to perform in exchange for money. These experiences prepared Little Tich for his future career. As a result of what he saw, he, like his father, became a strict teetotaller in later years, and showed a deep loathing for boisterous and intoxicated people. Little Tich revelled in his local celebrity status; however, the older he got the more self-conscious he became and wrongly interpreted the audience's laughter as being aimed more at his disabilities rather than his comical performances.

=== Move to Gravesend and early performances ===
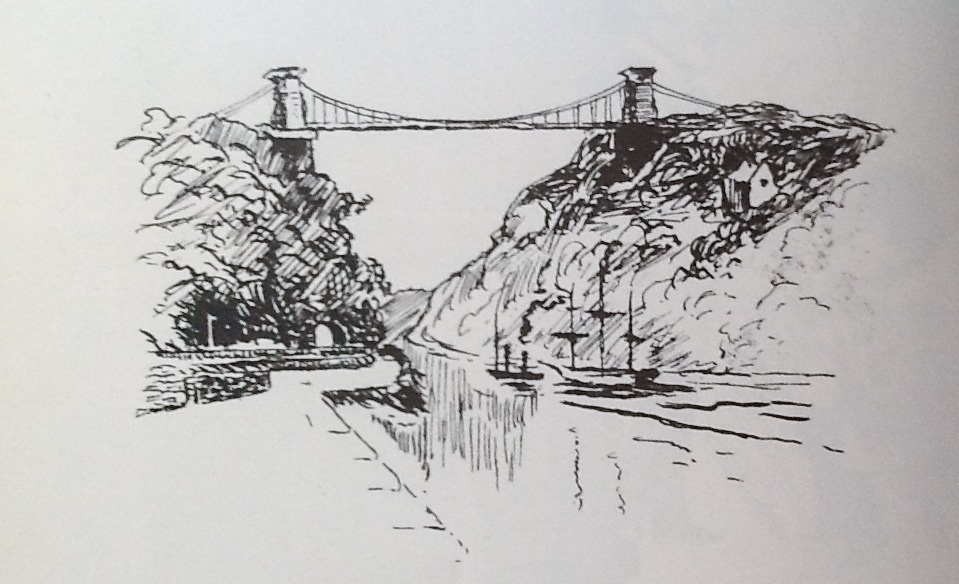
A childhood sketch by Little Tich, similar to the kind sold in the Blacksmith's Arms in the 1870s

Richard Relph sold the Blacksmith's Arms and the adjoining farm in 1875 and moved his family to Gravesend. The socially withdrawn Little Tich was forced to adapt to much busier surroundings; day-trippers, holidaymakers and fishermen often frequented the streets and occupied the plethora of public houses which adorned the port and neighbouring roads. He resumed his education, this time at Christ Church School, where he spent the next three years. In 1878 the headmaster deemed him too educationally advanced for the school, and Richard Relph was advised to secure for his young son a watchmaking apprenticeship instead; Relph ignored the advice.

By 1878 Little Tich's parents were unable to financially provide for him further and he sought full-time employment as a lather boy in a barber's shop in Gravesend. One evening, together with a friend whose brother was appearing in a talent contest, he visited a music hall for the first time and quickly became "hooked" on the idea of being able to perform. Thanks largely to his local celebrity status of being a "freak", he was welcomed into the many public houses which catered for soldiers, sailors, merchant seamen and day-trippers from London.

By 1878, Little Tich had saved enough money to buy himself a tin whistle which he used to "amuse [him]self by playing all the jolly and sentimental pantomime songs of the day". To earn money, he began busking to local theatre goers who were waiting in the outside queues. On the way home from his busking performances, he devised eccentric dances, much to the amusement of his onlooking neighbours. Little Tich made his stage debut as Harry Relph at the age of 12 in 1879. The venue—although unidentified—was described by his daughter Mary as being a "back-street, free-and-easy" where the acts were predominantly made up of amateurs and beginners. The audiences were often harsh and they would display their displeasure by throwing objects onto the stage.

One evening, having exhausted the list of amateur talent, the compere called on Little Tich and his tin-whistle to take up the next turn. The performance was a success and Little Tich returned every night, often accompanying his tin-whistle piece with impromptu dance routines. News of his performances spread, and he was soon signed up by the proprietor of the neighbouring Royal Exchange music hall, who bought his new signing a pair of clogs. Little Tich became a popular draw at the hall and often sang thirty songs a night. It was here that he discovered the art of blackface, a popular type of entertainment widely performed around the British Isles at the time. (Note: Popular music hall comedians who started their career as blackface artistes include Alfred Vance and Bransby Williams.)

=== 1880s ===
==== Early London engagements ====
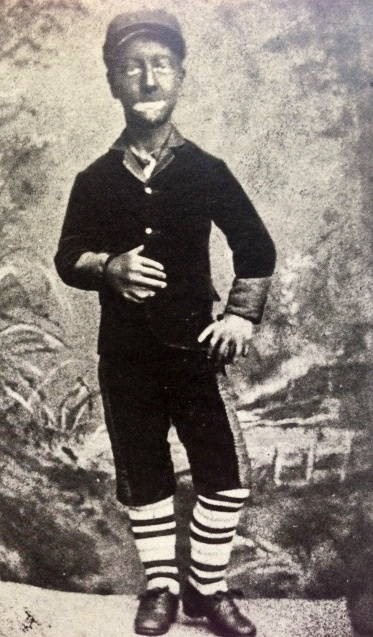
Little Tich in blackface during a provincial performance in England in the 1880s

At the start of the 1880s, Little Tich assumed the stage name "The Infant Mackney" (Note: The name was based on E. W. Mackney (1825–1909) a Morpeth-born clog dancer and singer who excelled in the art of blackface.) and graduated to the world of open-air theatre. The following year, he joined a blackface troupe who performed regularly at the Rosherville Pleasure Gardens; the local historian J.R.S. Clifford described them as "a band of minstrel darkies of a superior type". Little Tich's transition from amateur to professional performer came when he appeared in a weekly spot at Barnard's Music Hall in Chatham. Lew Barnard, the hall's proprietor, offered him 35 shillings a week. Thrilled at the prospect of appearing in a proper music hall, Little Tich changed his name from The Infant Mackney to Young Tichborne, a nickname he had gained while living in Cudham years earlier. (Note: The nickname derives from the Tichborne case of 1854, a legal cause célèbre which occurred in Victorian England in the 1860s and 1870s. The claimant Arthur Orton was a fat man and the name Tichborne was frequently used to describe persons who were of such stature. In his early years, Little Tich was also overweight and he became known as "Young Tichborne". When he appeared on stage as a youth, audiences would often shout "come on little Tichbourne" when he was about to come onto the stage, or if he was struggling with his act. By the mid-1880s, he had lost almost all his excess weight, but the name had stuck and it then became an ironic term of endearment owing to the giant stature of Orton, compared to the diminutive one of Little Tich.) He enjoyed initial success at Barnard's, but audience numbers soon diminished and his pay was reduced to 15 shillings a week as a result. To supplement his income, he resumed his position in the barber's shop and took on a string of menial jobs that lasted six months.

In 1881 Little Tich left home with his sister Agnes, who chaperoned her young brother around the music halls and variety clubs throughout England. By now, he had swapped the tin-whistle for a picco pipe which he used to accompany his clog dancing routine. He despised his early experiences of provincial touring as he was often forced to sleep in dosshouses with very little money or food. To survive, he would often return to busking outside music halls to the waiting audiences. In the early months of 1884, he secured an engagement at a rundown public house called The Dolphin in Kidderminster, where he was paid £2 a week. (Note: £2 a week equates to £215 in 2025 (adjusted for inflation).) He also hired his first agent who, unbeknown to Little Tich, had advertised him as a "freak" and a "six-fingered novelty". The comedian was furious with the description and quickly dispensed with the agent's services. By the summer months, his engagements had become infrequent so he used the long periods of unemployment constructively. He learned how to read and write music and taught himself to play various musical instruments including the piano, fiddle and cello. He also mastered dancing in big boots. (Note: The act of dancing in oversized shoes, or "big boots" as they came to be known, originated from clog dancing with the outsized flat shoe being used for comic effect by "nigger comedians".)

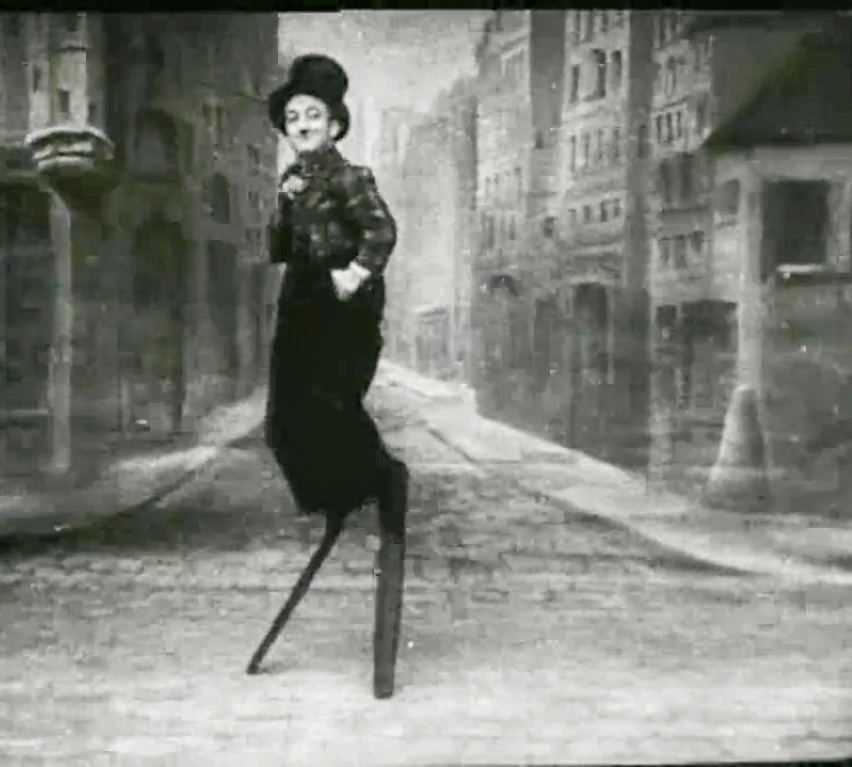
Little Tich midway through a performance of the Big-Boot Dance

In November 1884 he changed his stage name for the third time to Little Tich, which derived from Tichborne, and "Tich" or "Tichy" became a common term meaning small. (Note: Although he had officially changed his stage name only three times up until this point, he was unofficially billed with at least five others including: "Young Tichborne, Pocket Mackney"; "Young Tichborne, Little Black Storm"; "Young Tichborne, The Picco Soloist"; or simply "Tiny Tich".) His reasoning for the name change was to capitalise on the release of the Tichborne claimant fraudster Arthur Orton who was then touring the British Isles in the hope of reopening the case. The change of name also coincided with the signing of a new agent who was known in London for being "one of the brightest and youngest in [show]business". The agent, Edward Colley (1859–1889), was equally thrilled with the acquisition of a new star and secured him a double engagement at the Marylebone Music Hall where he appeared as "Little Titch, The Most Curious Comique in Creation" and immediately after at the Forester's Music Hall, where he was billed as "Little Titch, the Funny Little Nigger". A reporter for The Era predicted "We shall probably hear a great deal more about Little Titch, [sic] as he seems to be one of the few that can invest the business of the Negro comedian with any humour."

By Christmas 1884, Little Tich was a resident performer in four London music halls: the Middlesex Music Hall where he had an 8 pm billing, the Marylebone (at 9 pm), the Star Palace of Varieties in Bermondsey (at 10 pm), and Crowders Music Hall in Mile End (at 11 pm). Out of the four halls, he had the most success at the Marylebone and fulfilled a ten-week run. A critic for The Era who witnessed him perform at the Marylebone thought that he was "a curious comic" and that "his antics, his sayings and his business generally [were] very amusing, and he will doubtless improve in his singing, which is weak at present, even for a Negro delineator". The commentator further noted that "he appear[ed] to be quite a young man at present; but his dancing is peculiarly funny, though his dress in one of his characters is vulgar and suggestive; this should be altered".

Having been a success in London for nearly a year, Little Tich travelled to Scotland to appear in pantomime for the first time during the 1885–86 Christmas season. Robinson Crusoe opened at the Royal Princess Theatre in Glasgow and he appeared in the small role of Chillingowadaborie, a black-faced attendant for one of the main characters King Tum-tum. (Note: The name "Chillingowadaborie" was named after a ditty sung by the lion comique Arthur Lloyd.) The following Christmas, Little Tich starred for a second time in pantomime, this time at the Pavilion Theatre, Whitechapel in a production of Cinderella in which he played "King Mischief".

==== American success ====
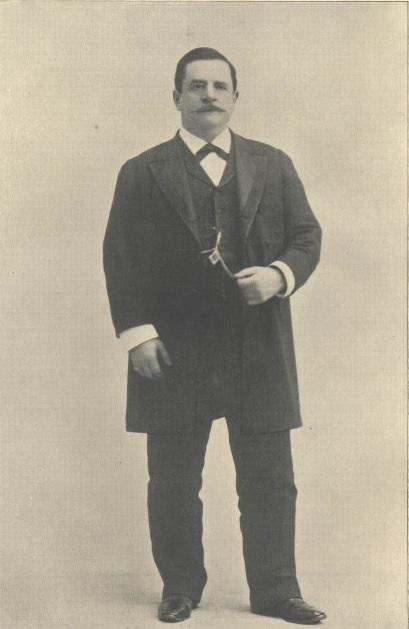
Tony Pastor, who engaged Little Tich for his first American tour in 1887

The American impresario Tony Pastor came to England in 1886 and signed Little Tich for a tour of the United States. Pastor had seen the comedian perform at a small music hall called Gatti's-in-the-Road near to Westminster Bridge and was recruiting for his Gaiety Theatre Company. Little Tich left for America in the early months of 1887 and assumed his first role for Pastor in a burlesque version of The Hunchback of Notre-Dame, playing the lead character for a fee of £10 a week. Later, during a successful run in a parody of Louis Bertin's opera La Esmeralda, he impressed audiences with his "Big-Boot Dance", and Pastor engaged his new star for a further two seasons in the mock-opera which had a total run of nine months. To show his appreciation for the record profits and huge audience attendances, Pastor presented Little Tich with a gold medal and a rare white Bohemian Shepherd dog which the comedian called Cheri.

Little Tich's success under Pastor brought him to the attention of the Chicago State Opera Company, who secured him on a two-year contract for a fee of $150 a week. Before the contract commenced, he was allowed to travel back to England where he honoured a pantomime commitment by appearing in Dick Whittington at the Theatre Royal in Brighton. In the piece he took the billing of "Tiny Titch" and played the Emperor Muley. In June 1888, at the Chicago Opera House, Little Tich starred in The Crystal Slipper, a burlesque loosely based on Cinderella; (Note: The Crystal Slipper was written by Alfred Thompson, an author and designer for Pastor's Gaiety Company.) the production was a hit for the comedian and completed a run of over ten months. The Era described him as "the quaint little Negro comedian" and called his American engagement "brilliantly successful". During The Crystal Slipper, Little Tich met the English dancer Laurie Brooks, whom he married in Cook County, Illinois on 20 January 1889. (Note: Laurie Brooks was born in 1866 and lived in Lisson Grove, Marylebone, which at that time was a slum area of central London.) That year marked the end of Little Tich's "blacking up" routine, which he had performed in between his commitments for the Chicago State Opera Company. He was told by a producer that the American audiences would find the black face and English accent too much of a contrast and opined "a deaf mute with one eye could see you aint a coon". Little Tich initially became worried at the prospect of appearing on stage without make-up, but found that the audience approved of the change.

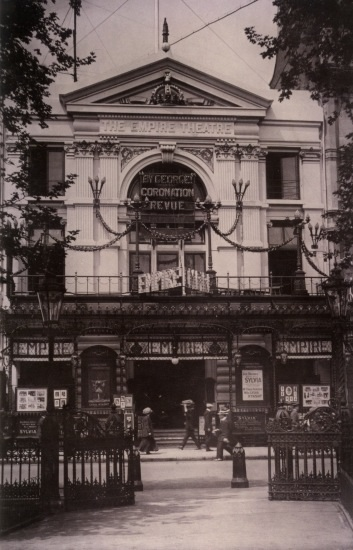
The Empire, Leicester Square, a popular music hall but one at which Little Tich scored minimal success in 1889

As the months progressed, the tour matured and news of his performances travelled across America. (Note: The other states and cities within the tour included New York, Philadelphia, Minneapolis, Baltimore, St Louis, Cincinnati, Kansas City, Milwaukee, Detroit, Cleveland, and Washington.) To compensate for the loss of his blackface act, Little Tich perfected his Big-Boot Dance instead and swapped from 10 to 28 inches (25 to 71 cm) boots which he found more suitable for his size. He had also mastered a quick change into the novelty footwear which he could perform in minutes. One stage director became concerned that the pause was too long for the audience to wait, and he threw the boots onto the stage causing the star to run back out in front of the waiting audience to put the boots on in front of them. While he did this, the orchestra provided an accompaniment of "till ready" music. For the audience, this provided much hilarity and they assumed it was part of the act. The unintentional sketch was "an instant hit" and the comedian incorporated this into his future Big-Boot Dance routine.

In April 1889 Little Tich briefly returned to London to star at the Empire Theatre in Leicester Square where he was poorly received by audiences. As a result, the manager of the theatre reduced the comedian's wages to £6 a week. The experience left him bitter towards the English entertainment industry and he returned to America to appear in a new production for the Chicago State Opera. The production, Bluebeard Junior, was not as successful as its predecessor, but toured for seven months. Despite his bad reviews back in England, Little Tich began to feel homesick and he was allowed to return home a few months short of his contract expiration. Once back, he and his wife set up home at 182 Kennington Road, Lambeth; Laurie later gave birth to the couple's son Paul on 7 November 1889.

=== 1890s ===
==== Return to London and West End debut ====
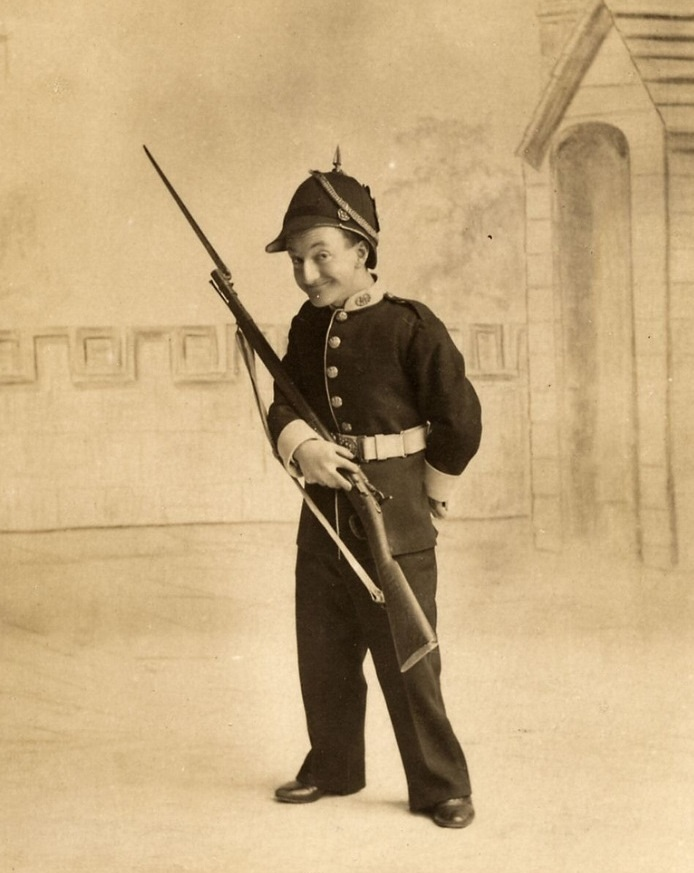
Little Tich on stage as a soldier in the 1890s

In the later months of 1889 Little Tich secured an engagement at the London Pavilion in Piccadilly Circus. (Note: The London Pavilion was built on the site of a former coaching inn and stable yard. Coincidentally, the former road where the buildings once stood was called Tichborne Street.) This time, he found his English critics to be complimentary about his talent, but as their praise was largely about his success in America, he considered them hypocritical. News of his much-improved performances travelled throughout the country and he was visited by Thomas W. Charles, manager of Manchester's Prince's Theatre. Charles offered Little Tich a leading role in his forthcoming pantomime Babes in the Wood. The 1889–90 production was a huge success for the comedian and his performance reportedly earned him "the heartiest applause of the evening".

By the early months of 1890, Augustus Harris, the influential manager of the Theatre Royal, Drury Lane, had travelled to Manchester to look for new talent for his theatre's forthcoming 1890–91 pantomime. Impressed with what he saw, he offered the comedian a theatrical residency at Drury Lane but he was forced to withdraw it as Little Tich was contracted to Charles for a further year; Harris instead signed Little Tich for a two-year contract starting the following season. The deal required Little Tich to star in two pantomimes for a wage of £36 a week. Following on from his success in Babes in the Wood which culminated in April 1890, the theatre manager Rollo Balmain cast him as Quasimodo in a production of The Hunchback of Notre-Dame at the Theatre Royal, Plymouth. The show featured a burlesque centrepiece which required Little Tich to dress as a ballerina and gave him the opportunity to perform two of his earliest songs, "Smiles" and "I Could Do, Could Do, Could Do with a Bit", both written for him by Walter Tilbury.

In 1890 Little Tich continued to impress his London music hall audiences and appeared on the front covers of both the Entr'acte and the Music Hall magazines, with the latter being widely available in the majority of London music hall auditoriums. Towards the end of the year, Little Tich appeared at the opening of the Tivoli Music Hall, before returning to Manchester at Christmas to fulfil the second of his two pantomime engagements for Thomas Charles in Little Bo-peep, in which he played Toddlekins. The following year he reprised his role of Quasimodo and toured the provinces in The Hunchback of Notre-Dame with Balmain's company.

==== Life at Drury Lane ====
Clockwise from top left: Augustus Harris, Dan Leno, Marie Lloyd and Herbert Campbell

The year 1891 signalled a new era in the career of Little Tich. The Drury Lane pantomimes were known for their extravagance and splendour and featured lavish sets and big budgets. (Note: Each production had a cast of over a hundred performers, with ballet dancers, acrobats, and marionettes, and included an elaborate transformation scene as well as an energetic harlequinade. The main writer, until his death in 1889, was Edward Blanchard, with Harris often acting as co-writer. Harris, who was responsible for casting each production, favoured the use of music hall performers to play the principal boy and dame roles, but Blanchard disagreed, preferring instead to use seasoned actors. Commenting in 1885, Blanchard said "My smooth and pointed lines are turned into ragged prose and arrant nonsense. Hardly anything done as I intended or spoken as I had written, the music hall element is crushing the rest and the good old fairy tales never to be again illustrated as they should be.") The first of the Drury Lane pantomimes in which Little Tich appeared was Humpty Dumpty in 1891 which also starred Drury Lane regulars Marie Lloyd, Dan Leno and Herbert Campbell. As well as the title role, Little Tich also played the minor part of the Yellow Dwarf in the harlequinade. It was during the latter characterisation that he revived his Big-Boot Dance, which was a hit with audiences. The following Christmas, he equalled this success with his second pantomime Little Bo-Peep in which he played the part of "Hop of my Thumb". As well as Leno, Lloyd and Campbell, Harris recruited the singers Ada Blanche and Cecilia Loftus as principal boy and girl respectively. Harris was thrilled with Little Tich and signed him for the 1893–94 pantomime Robinson Crusoe in which he played Man Friday. The Derby Daily Telegraph called the comedian "one of the most amusing pantomime dames of all time". Despite a budget of £30,000, Robinson Crusoe failed to equal the success of the previous two shows, which caused Harris to rethink his cast. Unaware of Harris's plans, Little Tich approached him with a view of a pay rise; the proposition angered the manager and not only was his request refused, but he was also ruled out of any future production.

==== New theatrical ventures and international engagements ====
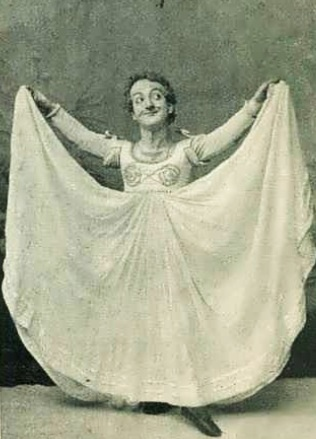
Little Tich as Miss Turpentine in The Serpentine Dance (1893)

In the early months of 1891, Little Tich completed a successful tour of Germany. Two years later he developed the character Miss Turpentine for his self-choreographed sketch The Serpentine Dance, which he performed over the next three years in Hamburg, Geneva, Rotterdam, Brussels, Nice, Monte Carlo, Barcelona and Budapest; the tour also enabled him to become fluent in French, German, Italian and Spanish. He portrayed Miss Turpentine as an eccentric ballerina who wore an ill-fitting tutu. The dance was a comic variation of the well-known skirt dance belonging to Loie Fuller, which had been popular in France years earlier. Another successful characterisation was that of an eccentric Spanish dancer, which Little Tich devised while touring Europe, and like The Serpentine Dance, relied heavily on acrobatic choreography and comic miming rather than eccentric singing and joke reciting.

It was around this period when Little Tich was inducted into the fledgling entertainers' fraternity, the Grand Order of Water Rats. In 1906, he would serve as "King Rat" for the order. In 1894, free from his contractual obligations at Drury Lane, he took a three-year break from the English music hall scene and travelled to France to fulfil a number of engagements; over the next ten years, he divided his time between there and England. In the early months of 1895, he moved from music hall to variety theatre, a transition which many of his contemporaries had already successfully achieved. Lord Tom Noddy was showcased in September 1896 and ran at the Garrick Theatre, London for two months. The production had minimal success in the capital but was received well in the provinces. (Note: The story involved the juvenile Lord Tom Noddy, an ambitious (but equally poor) aristocrat who falls in love with his nurse in his infancy.) The show provided Little Tich with the chance to promote himself as a serious actor and to separate himself from the reputation of simply being the "deformed dwarf from the music hall". The audience were described as being "very large" whose "bursts of laughter w[ere] frequent and loud". A reporter for the Edinburgh Evening News thought that Little Tich was "the life and soul of the sketch" whose singing was "fairly good while [his] dancing was smart", while the critic William Archer dismissed Little Tich as being the "Quasimodo of the music halls, whose talent lies in a grotesque combination of agility with deformity".

The dramatist George Dance who wrote Lord Tom Noddy, and partnered Little Tich in his theatre company

He formed his own theatre company in mid-1895, and produced his first show called Lord Tom Noddy, in which he also starred. He commissioned the dramatist George Dance to write the piece and made him a partner in the company. On 11 December 1896, Little Tich was invited to appear at the Folies Bergère in France, where he starred in a short piece as Miss Turpentine and performed the Big-Boot Dance. One journalist for the Sunday Referee claimed that "no artist since Loie Fuller, four years earlier, had scored such a success", and as a result, he signed a two-year contract at the Folies. Little Tich returned to England in the later months of 1897, where he self-produced the second of his company's two shows, a musical comedy called Billy. (Note: The story centred on a character called Billy Vavasour, a member of the sporting aristocracy who pursues the daughter of a strict army general. The show co-starred the Edwardian actress Evie Greene.) Despite the show enjoying a healthy provincial tour after opening in Newcastle, one reporter thought that "it ha[d] not very much to recommend it", but thought that Little Tich gave "some excellent fooling" and that it "[was] impossible not to laugh at some of the eccentricities". However, the farce failed to make it to the West End of London. Little Tich saw this as a snub and he refused to perform in the capital again. Instead, he travelled to South Shields, where he appeared briefly in a successful short play called Giddy Ostend before retreating to France.

In 1898 he broke the Folies contract shortly before its expiry after being scouted by Joseph Oller, who hired him to perform at the Olympia Music Hall in Paris. Following the breach of contract, the Folies manager Édouard Marchand initiated legal action against the comedian, who settled out of court for an undisclosed sum. The theatrical manager C.B. Cochran who had seen the comedian perform during this period, described him as "a reincarnation of the dwarf court-jesters of the Middle Ages—the little English Don Antonio of Velasquez". By now, Little Tich had become frustrated with his English audiences. With Billy failing to reach London and the unequal level of success in the English capital compared to France made him shun the English variety theatre scene altogether in the final years of the century. He returned to the less-popular music halls as a result, where he remained for the rest of his career.

=== 1900s ===
==== Marriage troubles ====
Clément-Maurice's film of Little Tich at the Phono-Cinéma-Théâtre performing his Big-Boot Dance in 1900

In September 1894, Little Tich and Laurie established the family home in the rue Lafayette, Paris. During 1897, while Little Tich was away on a tour of England, Germany and Austria, Laurie eloped to Berlin with the French actor François Marty, leaving her husband responsible for their young son Paul. Unable to care for Paul, Little Tich sent him to England to live with relatives. (Note: Paul Relph shunned the idea of becoming a watchmaker which his father had desired for his son's future career and instead became a performer. From the age of 14, Paul Relph had become estranged from his father, who spent a large amount of time away working. Because of this he was brought up by his strict Aunt Millie until the age of 17 when he left home to join Fred Karno in one of his theatre companies. Subsequently he appeared as a key player in Karno's Mumming Birds sketch from 1906 to 1910. After this, his career fell into obscurity and he ended up as a clown in a travelling circus. Years later, Paul became a homeless down-and-out who relied on various handouts from friends and family. Paul Relph died of stomach cancer at Whittington Hospital on 9 April 1948, aged 58.) That year, Little Tich met the dancer Julia Recio (Note: Julia Recio was born in 1869 in Málaga and was the youngest daughter of a Spanish government official. She was brought up in Paris, and became successful in Spanish dancing, performing in Moulin Rouge.) during an engagement at the Olympia Music Hall in Paris and the two began a relationship. They moved to a flat in the boulevard Poissonnière, Paris, where they lived together, though keeping this a secret until after Laurie Relph's death in 1901. (Note: Laurie Relph died in a Berlin clinic and left £2,900 in her will, with the majority going to her son. She never made contact with her family again and her cause of death is unknown.) In 1900 Little Tich appeared in the French capital's Phono-Cinéma-Théâtre where he performed the Big-Boot Dance, which was recorded on film by the French director Clément-Maurice. Years later, the film-maker Jacques Tati called the piece "a foundation for everything that has been realised in comedy on the screen".

In 1902, Little Tich starred in a special, one-off revue with Marie Lloyd at the Tivoli theatre called The Revue, which was staged to celebrate the coronation of Edward VII. The following year, Little Tich's performance at the Oxford Music Hall was described as being "... a very droll turn" by a reporter for The Cornishman newspaper, who also called his Big-Boot Dance "wonderful". Little Tich rented another London property at 1 Teignmouth Road in Kilburn, to escape his life with Julia, which he was finding increasingly mundane. Despite their troubles, he married Julia in a discreet London ceremony on 31 March 1904 at St Giles Register Office and rented a further address at 44 Bedford Court Mansions in Bloomsbury. Although initially happy, the marriage quickly deteriorated as a result of differing opinions over social activities and money; Julia was a sociable and extravagant person, whilst Little Tich preferred a quieter and thriftier lifestyle.

By 1906, Little Tich and Julia had become so estranged that she moved to a neighbouring flat, rented for her by her husband. The couple never publicly announced their separation, and he continued to provide financial support for his wife and fund her extravagant lifestyle for the next twenty years. Years later, Paul Relph admitted "Father and Julia never loved one another. Poor, poor father. His life was one long misery through her." Over the next four years, Little Tich continued to perform in both England and France and earned £10,000 a year. In 1905 he appeared in the second of a further three films for the French film industry called Le Raid Paris–Monte Carlo en deux heures, directed by Georges Méliès. This was followed by Little Tich in 1907, and Little Tich, the Tec two years later. In 1907 Little Tich travelled to South Africa, where he appeared in a successful, nine-week engagement for a fee of £500 a week. (Note: £500 in 1907 equates to £52,004 in 2025 (adjusted for inflation).) Soon after, he returned to England to take part in the Music Hall War, which saw the Variety Artistes' Federation fight for more freedom and better working conditions on behalf of music hall performers. In 1909 he received a serious leg injury while on stage at the Belfast Hippodrome during a performance of the Serpentine Dance. A doctor in the audience diagnosed a dislocated knee, which forced the comedian to take seven weeks' recuperation. Little Tich's performance was described by a reporter for the Evening Telegraph and Post as being "up to date" and declared the Serpentine Dance was "next to the Big-Boot Dance in popularity".

==== Recording career and new family ====
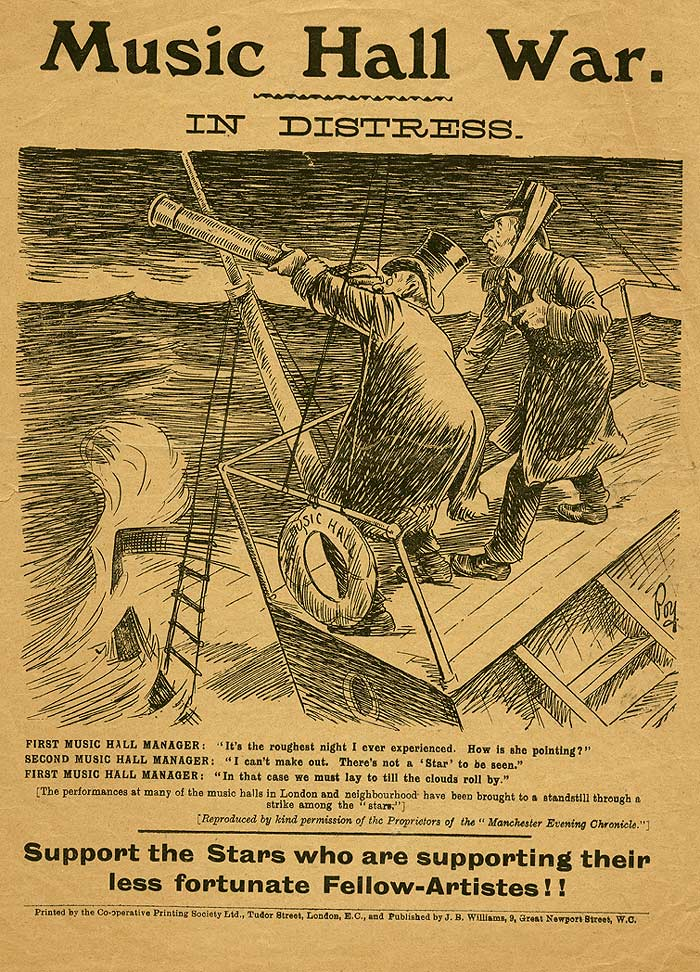
A poster for the 1907 Music Hall War

In 1910, Little Tich became the adoptive father of Rodolphe Knoepper, (Note: Rodolphe Knoepper's uncle Harry Alaska was, for a time, a valet and dresser to Little Tich, and the two became great friends. When Alaska's sister-in-law died unexpectedly, Knoepper was placed into Alaska's care but he was unable to look after the boy as Alaska was embarking on a theatrical career. Julia offered to raise the boy instead and he was moved to England where he remained with her until puberty. Knoepper later joined the British Army, and died during active service in April 1918.) an orphan born in 1899 to the brother of the Russian acrobat Harry Alaska. Alaska had previously worked for Little Tich as his dresser and after his death, Knoepper moved into the Relph residence in France and started his education there. After a few months of living with Little Tich, he was moved to London to stay with Julia. In later years Little Tich's daughter Mary said that her father treated Knoepper as more of a son than Paul, who became estranged from the family by the 1920s. While in Paris in 1910, Little Tich was made an officer of the Ordre des Palmes Académiques by the French Ministry of Public Instruction for his services to the stage.

Towards the end of 1910, he travelled to Scotland to complete a short engagement at the King's Theatre in Dundee. His performance was described by a theatre reviewer for the Evening Telegraph as being "downright genuine fun" and "very entertaining". The following year Little Tich recorded the first of a selection of his music hall songs on one-sided shellac discs used in the early acoustic recording process. Songs included "The Gas Inspector", "King Ki-Ki", "The Toreador" and "The Zoo Keeper" and were followed two years later by "The Waiter", "The Weather", "The Don of the Don Juans" and "A Risky Thing to Do".

In 1915 Little Tich cut short his engagement at the Golders Green Hippodrome to take up a better offer in Paris. As a result, the proprietors of the Hippodrome sued for breach of contract and he had to pay them £103 in compensation. That year he recorded "The Tallyman", "The Gamekeeper", "The Skylark" and "The Pirate" onto disc before heading to the northern English provinces to prepare for that year's Christmas pantomime at the Royal Court Theatre in Liverpool. It was there that he met Winifred Latimer (1892–1973), a singer and actress who had had some success on the London stage under Seymour Hicks a few years previously. (Note: Winifred Emma Ivy Latimer was born in Hove, Sussex, on 26 February 1892. She was the youngest child and only daughter of James Ivey, a commercial traveller, and his mistress, Harriet Latimer, who was related to the actor and theatre manager Harley Granville-Barker.) Tich and Winifred were both starring in the Christmas pantomime Sinbad the Sailor, in which Little Tich played the title role and Winifred supported him as the principal boy. The two grew close and against her parents wishes, they began a relationship, shortly before the pantomime closed in the early months of 1916. Sinbad the Sailor was a big success and Winifred was widely praised for her performance, which she attributed to the guidance she received from Little Tich.

In 1916 Winifred moved into a rented flat in Camden, chosen by Little Tich for its close proximity to his house in Bedford Square; this enabled him to visit her with less chance of being recognised. In 1917 he recorded "Tally-Ho!" and "The Best Man", the final two songs from his repertoire, onto shellac discs. That year Winifred became pregnant, which ended her career on the stage, a situation which pleased Little Tich immeasurably. However, Winifred was ostracised by her family and had to contend with life as an unmarried mother with no career and no chances of ever realising her remaining theatrical ambitions. On 23 February 1918, while Little Tich was performing in Brighton, she gave birth to a daughter whom she named Mary. She and Mary then moved to 64 Gloucester Place in Marylebone.

==== Last years and death ====
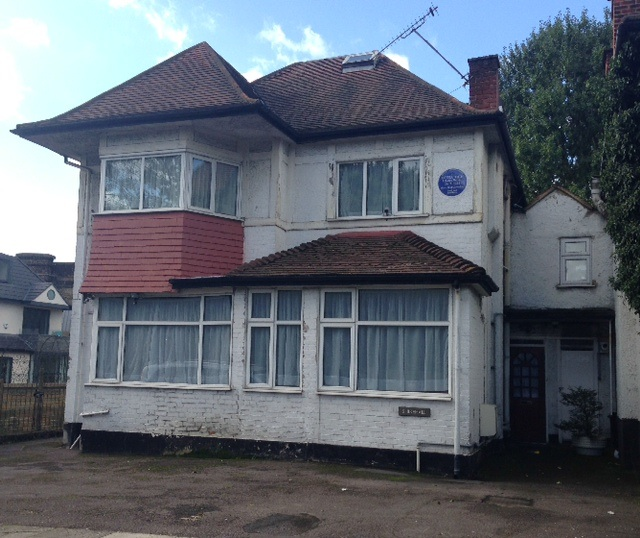
Little Tich's final residence in Shirehall Park, Hendon

By 1920, relations between Little Tich and Winifred's parents had improved and they welcomed him into the family. Despite renting a new, six-room flat in Marylebone for his daughter and mistress, the comedian was now finding it increasingly difficult to support Winifred, Mary and Julia on his earnings as the years of generosity had drastically depleted his savings. His annual income in 1921 and 1922 had topped £9,750 but had dropped to £3,743 by 1923. In 1925 he earned £6,300 but this fell the following year to just £2,100.

Worried by the drastic reduction in pay, he reduced Julia's payments, which angered her family. Another money-saving plan was to stop renting properties in London and secure a mortgage on a small house instead. To avoid speculation about his affair with Winifred, he decided to remain at Bedford Court Mansions, and bought a newly built house in Shirehall Park, Hendon, Northwest London in September 1925 for Winifred and Mary to move into. Soon after, he embarked on a successful tour of Europe which culminated at Christmas the same year. He returned to London and took part in a Christmas benefit at the London Coliseum, where he performed the Big-Boot Dance. The performance was by then proving too strenuous for the 58-year-old comedian, and he decided to retire it that year.

On the morning of 7 January 1926, Julia Relph died of a cerebral haemorrhage in the flat which Little Tich had rented for her. Despite their estrangement, the comedian was distraught at her death and spent two nights at the apartment with her corpse. A few days later, he moved in with Winifred where he arranged his wife's funeral, staying in the spare bedroom as a "house guest". He made frequent visits back to Bedford Court Mansions to organise Julia's paperwork and discovered that his wife had been having an affair with his friend Emile Footgers and that she was ten years older than she had led her husband to believe. Little Tich also found that she had used his money to buy a house in Golders Green as a future investment for Paul's daughter Constance, (Note: Constance Julia Davies née Relph was born in 1911. She was the daughter of Paul and his first wife Gilda Relph née Nicholas (1885–1954), a music hall dancer from Manchester. At the time of Constance's birth, Paul was on friendly terms with his stepmother Julia, but the relationship deteriorated in later years. Constance was estranged from her father, who left home when she was four years old. Gilda chose ambition over motherhood, and left Constance in the care of Julia who, in effect, became her mother in proxy.) and that his wife had participated in a secret scam to blackmail the comedian out of large quantities of cash. Despite the revelations, Little Tich mourned deeply for his wife and spoke fondly of her for the rest of his life.

The French actress Mistinguett, who appeared with Little Tich towards the end of his career

On 10 April 1926, Little Tich married Winifred at Caxton Hall, Westminster, with little publicity. Later that evening, he appeared at the Camberwell Palace in a short but popular engagement, while his new wife returned home to Hendon. For the honeymoon, the family travelled to Bristol, where Little Tich appeared on stage with the French actress Mistinguett, who presented him with a tributary gold statue of him wearing big boots. At the end of that year, the family paid a working visit to Australia, where he toured the Sydney theatres for a fee of £300 a week; (Note: £300 a week equates to £15,854 in 2025 (adjusted for inflation).) he received a lukewarm reception from audiences.

The following March, Little Tich and his family returned to England. He made only one appearance on stage that year, in November, when he introduced a new song called "The Charlady at the House of Commons". For the character's appearance he wore a ripped and dirty frock, a scrag wig and carried an old mop and bucket which he borrowed from home. The act required him to flip the mop up into the air and grab the handle before carrying on singing. During one evening's performance at the Alhambra Theatre, the trick went wrong and he received a blow to his head from the mop. Despite the pain, he continued with the piece and refused to seek medical treatment for the resulting bump and intense headache which followed.

One December morning in 1927, whilst getting ready for a family day out, Little Tich was conversing with his wife who was in a separate room, upstairs at Shirehall Park. When he stopped responding, she became concerned, went to the room where her husband was, and found him slumped and insensible in a chair. He was taken to hospital where doctors diagnosed a stroke. He became mute and lost all feeling on the right side of his body, but was discharged from hospital and returned home to Hendon. He was frequently visited by the surgeon Sir Alfred Fripp, who made a secondary diagnosis of pernicious anaemia which he cited as having played an instrumental part in the comedian's seizure.

On the morning of 10 February 1928, Little Tich died at his home in Shirehall Park, Hendon, aged 60 and he was later buried at East Finchley Cemetery. (Note: After Little Tich's death, Mary and Winifred continued to live together. By the mid-1940s they established a hotel at the address in Shirehall Park. Running out of money, they sold the house in 1971 and it was turned into a Jewish retirement home. Mary then moved to Brighton with her mother who died in a nursing home a few years later on 17 December 1973.) His death and funeral were national news. The author and theatre critic Walter MacQueen-Pope predicted that Little Tich would be remembered for his "physical peculiarity and the expression 'tichy', meaning small". A reporter for The Daily News called him "[the] comedian whose popularity had never waned and whose name was as famous in 1928 as it was when music-halls flourished 30 years ago". Writing in 1974, the author Naomi Jacob thought that Little Tich would be remembered for many years to come stating that "there is no reason why such names as Little Tich and Marie Lloyd should be forgotten any more than such names as Salvini, Bernhardt and Henry Irving".

== Sources ==
- Anthony, Barry (2010). The King's Jester. London: I. B. Taurus & Co. ISBN 978-1-84885-430-7.
- Findlater, Richard; Tich, Mary (1979). Little Titch: Giant of the Music Hall. London: Hamish Hamilton Ltd. ISBN 978-0-241-10174-2.
- Gillies, Midge (1999). Marie Lloyd: The One And Only. London: Orion Books Ltd. ISBN 978-0-7528-4363-6.
- Holloway, Stanley; Richards, Dick (1967). Wiv a little bit o' luck: The life story of Stanley Holloway. London: Frewin. OCLC 3647363.
- Jacob, Naomi (1972). Our Marie, Marie Lloyd: A Biography. London: Chivers Press. ISBN 978-0-85594-721-7.
- Macqueen-Pope, Walter (2010). Queen of the Music Halls: Being the Dramatized Story of Marie Lloyd. London: Nabu Press. ISBN 978-1-171-60562-1.
- Rohmer, Sax (2007). Little Titch: A Book of Travels and Wanderings. London: A&B Treebooks. ISBN 978-0-9794798-0-9.
- Short, Ernest Henry; Compton-Rickett, Arthur (1938). Ring Up the Curtain: Being a Pageant of English Entertainment covering Half a Century. London: Herbert Jenkins Limited. ISBN 978-0-8369-5299-5.
