= Paul-Eugène Mesplès =

French painter and musician (1849–1924)

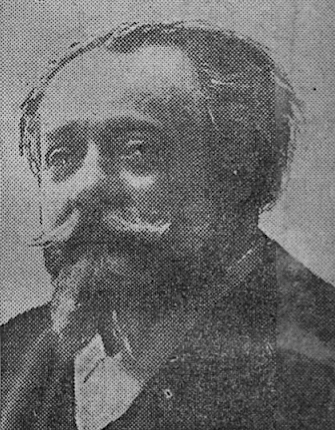
- Photographic portrait (1923)
- Born: 7 July 1849; Rue des Nonnains-d'Hyères, Paris
- Died: 2 September 1924 (aged 75); Quai d'Anjou, Paris
- Known for: Painting, lithography, engraving, musical composition
- Awards: Legion of Honour (Chevalier)

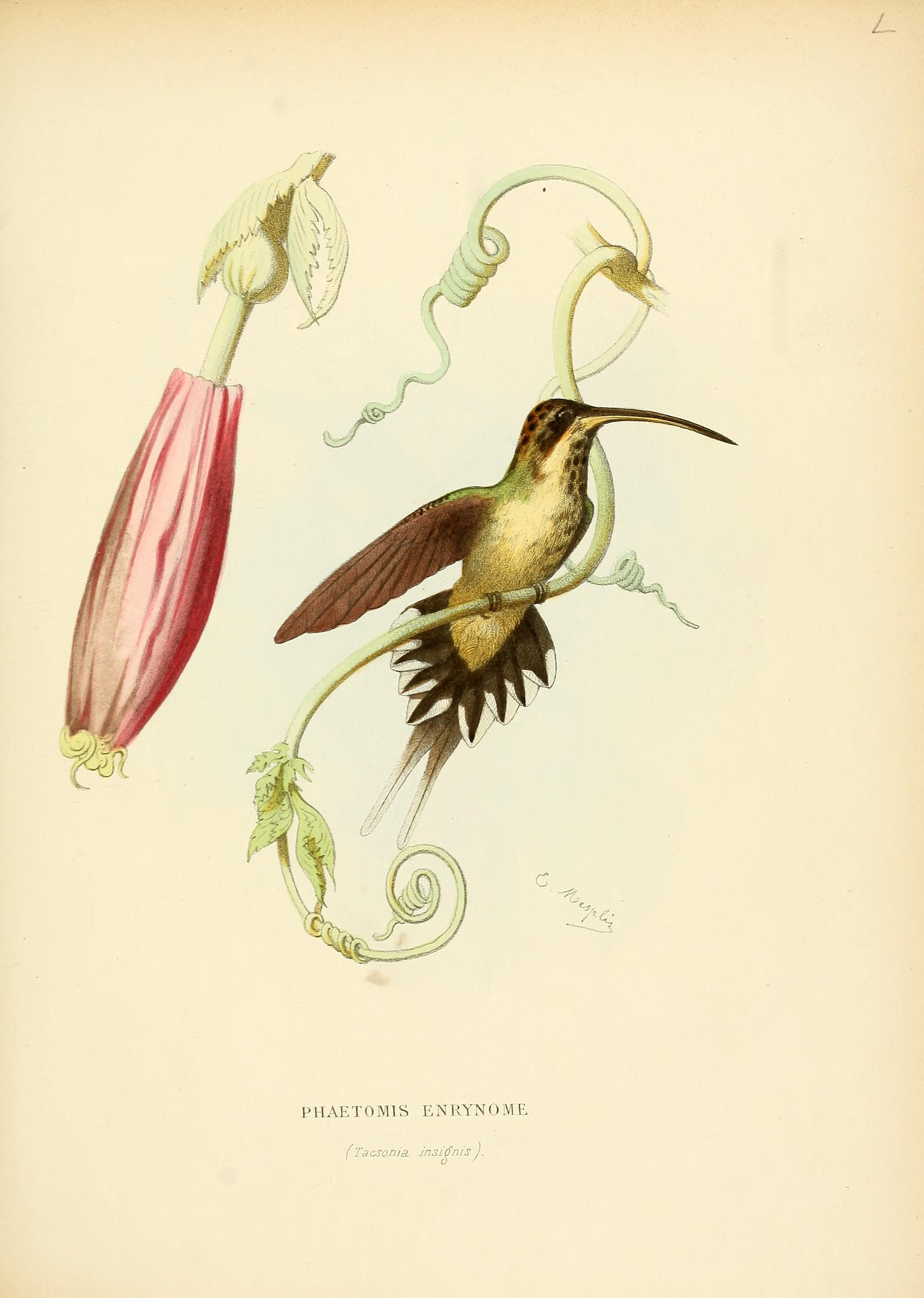
"Phaetomis enrynome", from the Histoires naturelles des oiseaux-mouches (Lyon, 1877)

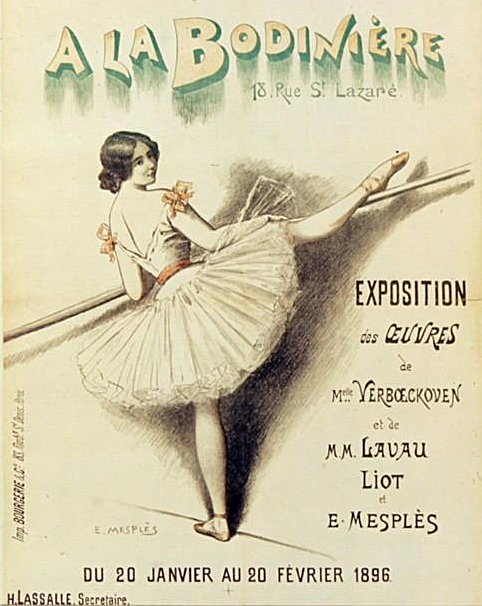
À la Bodinière, lithographic poster (1896)

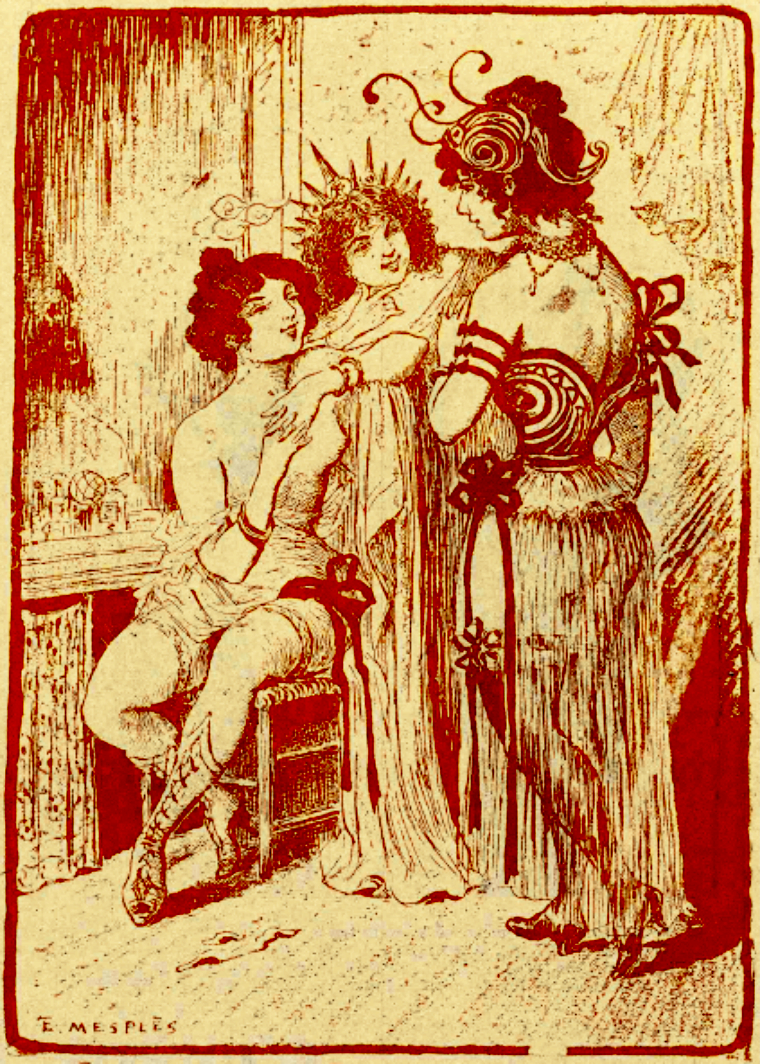
Cartoon published by the Romanian magazine Furnica (January 1906)

Paul-Eugène Mesplès (French pronunciation: [pɔl øʒɛn mɛsplɛs]; 1849–1924) was a French painter and lithographer, nicknamed the "painter of dancers"; a figure of Montmartre during the Belle Époque, he was also an engraver and an accomplished musician. He sometimes signed Un Tel ("So-and-so").

== Early life ==
Paul-Eugène Mesplès was born on 7 July 1849, the son of Jean-Marie Mesplès and Jeanne-Joséphine Malherbe, residing at 19 Rue des Nonnains-d'Hyères in the 14th arrondissement of Paris.

In the Franco-Prussian War, he was first a Garde Mobile of the Seine, and then a volunteer artilleryman. He finished the war as a lieutenant in the 145th infantry artillery regiment.

== Career ==
During the 1870s, after having been a free pupil of the painter Jean-Léon Gérôme, Mesplès drew caricatures intended for periodicals such as Le Monde illustré, which were light and sometimes naughty. His line was clean, cutting with precision the silhouette of the characters. His Paris studio was located at 29 Rue Clauzel.

His talent as an observer, his precision, were then noticed by the National Museum of Natural History, in Paris, which hired him to illustrate the collections of the fund. One of his most remarkable works of this period was Les plantes des champs et des bois: excursions botaniques printemps, été, automne, hiver (Paris: J.-B. Baillière and Sons, 1887).

In the meantime, he fell in love with opera dancers and stage costumes: in the early 1880s, he produced his first album of Danses de Paris, a series of drawings engraved by himself, in etching. Mesplès was a prolific engraver: he practiced with the chisel as well as lithography. Some of his engravings were published jointly with those of Jules-Armand Hanriot, with whom he shared the same printer, Auguste Delâtre. He was the vice-president of the Société des artistes lithographes français.

He exhibited from 1880 at the Salon de Paris then, in 1881 at the Salon des artistes français, and from 1884, at the Salon des artistes indépendants.

In December 1886, he launched with René Benoist Le Costume au théâtre, revue de la mise en scene, a monthly magazine which included colour plates drawn and engraved, and which ended in December 1890 after forty-five deliveries: there were also illustrations by Alfons Mucha.

Mesplès also took part, with Charles Bianchini, in the design of costumes for various show scenes: for Monsieur Scapin by Jean Richepin at the Comédie-Française (1886), and L'Année joyeuse, a revue by Armand Numès and Édouard Hermil, at the Cluny Theater (1889).

He became a figure of the Montmartre artistic scene, illustrating the escapades of the Bal des Quat'z'Arts and frequenting the entourage of Jules Lévy, founder of the Incoherents art movement.

In 1896, he exhibited a series of colour compositions around dancers, including Cléo de Mérode, at La Bodinière. The same year, in June, he was made a Chevalier of the Legion of Honour, under the patronage of Ernest Maindron.

Around 1900, he produced words and compositions of his own which he illustrated himself. With the entry of France into the First World War, in August 1914, he composed various patriotic songs.

== Death ==
He died on 2 September 1924 at 17 Quai d'Anjou, in the 4th arrondissement of Paris, where he had a workshop. A few months earlier, he had made the front page of Comœdia, talking with Maurice Hamel, who recalled that before the war Mesplès was called le peintre des danseuses ("the painter of dancers").

The Museum of European and Mediterranean Civilisations in Marseille has some thirty postcard-sized animal chromolithographs by him, published by Baster & Vieillemard (late 19th century).

== Selected works ==
=== Illustrations ===
- Jean-Joseph Vadé, La Pipe cassée. Poème épitragipoissardihéroicomique (Paris: Th. Belin, 1882)
- Charles Aubert, Les péchés roses, etchings by Jules-Armand Hanriot and E. Mesplès (Paris: among all booksellers, 1884–1885)
- Guy de Maupassant, Toine (Paris: C. Marpon and E. Flammarion, 1886)
- Amélie Perronnet, Les premières amitiés, 120 illustrations (Paris: Jules Lévy, 1887)
- Alexandre Dumas, La Dame de Monsoreau, three prints (Paris: A. Lévy, n.d.)

=== Scores ===
- Brûlants Baisers! Valse chantée (Paris: E. Dupré, 1902)
- Pourquoi l'aimer tant! Mélodie (Paris: E. Dupré, 1902)
- Le Refuge!, lyrics by *** (Paris: E. Dupré, 1902)
- Le Chant de l'aviateur (1910)
- Chère France! (1914)
- Feu! Feu! Partout! (1914)
- Victoire!, music by Casimir Renard (1921)

== Sources ==
- "Mesplès, Paul Eugène". Benezit Dictionary of Artists. Oxford University Press. 2011. doi:10.1093/benz/9780199773787.article.B00121393.
- "Paul Eugène Mesplès (1849–1924)". BnF Data. Bibliothèque nationale de France. 18 January 2022.
