= Manuel Benedito =

Spanish painter (1875–1963)

Manuel Benedito Vives
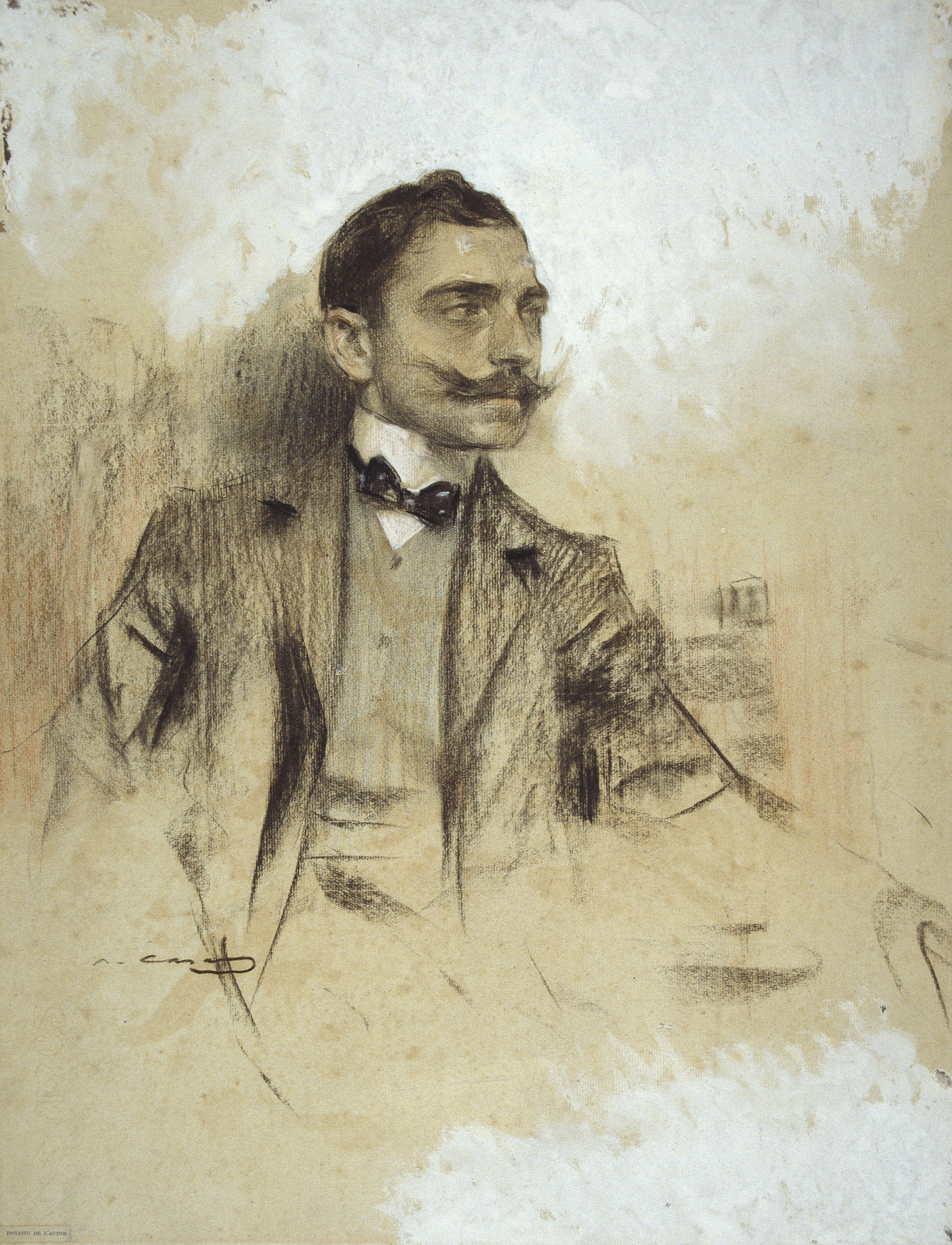
- Portrait of Benedito by Ramon Casas
- Born: 25 December 1875; Valencia, Spain
- Died: 20 June 1963 (aged 87); Madrid, Spain
- Known for: Painting

Manuel Benedito Vives (25 December 1875 – 20 June 1963) was a Spanish painter. He was born in Valencia on Christmas 1875. His father was a taxidermist, and his brother was a musician. At age 13, he was enrolled in the San Carlos School of Fine Arts, from which he graduated six years later. Upon graduation, he began working in Joaquín Sorolla's workshop and traveled to Madrid with him two years later. Between 1911 and 1913, he worked as a drawing teacher at the Higher School of Fine Arts in Madrid. Later, he became professor of color and composition at this institution and eventually served as director until 1945. He painted landscapes, still lifes, and portraits, the later of which he was best known for, especially towards the end of his career. He painted Alfonso XIII several times. In 1944, he received the Civil Order of Alfonso X, the Wise.

== Biography ==
The Fundación Manuel Benedito museum, founded in October 2020 by Vicenta Benedito, his niece, is dedicated to his work. The museum is located where his studio used to be in Madrid. In 1897 he won a Third Medal at the National Exhibition for his painting The Washing after Work. Later, he continued his training thanks to a scholarship that allowed him to spend four years at the Spanish Academy in Rome, where he shared classes with artists Eduardo Chicharro and Fernando Álvarez de Sotomayor. After this period of training, Benedito developed an active artistic career in different parts of Europe. In 1905 he settled in Brittany, France, where he created works inspired by the fishing life in Concarneau. Later, he worked in towns in Salamanca, Spain, producing paintings with everyday life and traditional themes. He also traveled to the Netherlands and lived in Paris for a few years, where he painted Cleo de Merode. Manuel Benedito was granted many awards and honors, including medals from national and international exhibitions, as well as important official decorations. He also took part in cultural institutions, becoming a member of several boards and a full member of the Royal Academy of Fine Arts of San Fernando.

== Work ==
In his artistic production, Benedito was a painter with academic training and little interest in new artistic styles. He worked in different genres, such as decorative painting, still life, hunting scenes, illustration, and scenes of everyday life, with some limited work in social themes. However, his most important work was in portrait painting, where he achieved great recognition. During his career, he painted portraits of many people, including members of the aristocracy, artists, and politicians. His subjects included noblewomen, actresses, singers, as well as political and military figures. His work as a portrait painter of the royal family was especially important, particularly his portraits of King Alfonso XIII, whom he painted multiple times. In later years, he continued painting important figures, including the head of state Francisco Franco. His achievements are numerous, from the success of his first exhibition at the Amaré Salons to the retrospective exhibition of 1958, organized by the General Directorate of Fine Arts. He received the First Medal of Fine Arts in 1904 and 1906, a Third Medal at the Paris Salon in 1907, and another First Medal at the International Exhibition in Munich in 1909. He also won a Gold Medal at the Universal Exhibition in Brussels in 1910. That same year, he received a Diploma of Honor and a Gold Medal at the National Exhibition in Valencia, as well as a First Medal at the International Exhibition in Buenos Aires, an award he won again the following year at the International Exhibition in Barcelona. Later, he received the March Art Prize in 1959, among others. He was a member of the boards of the Prado Museum, the Museum of Modern Art, and the Sorolla Foundation. He also belonged to the Association of Writers and Artists, was a corresponding member of the Hispanic Society of America, and a full member of the Royal Academy of Fine Arts of San Fernando, where he eventually became vice-dean. In 1944, he was honored with the Grand Cross of the Order of Alfonso X the Wise, and this honor was increased with the same rank in the Order of Isabella the Catholic, awarded to him in 1958. The city of Valencia gave him its Gold Medal and named a street after him while he was alive.
