= Carlos Vázquez Úbeda =

Spanish artist

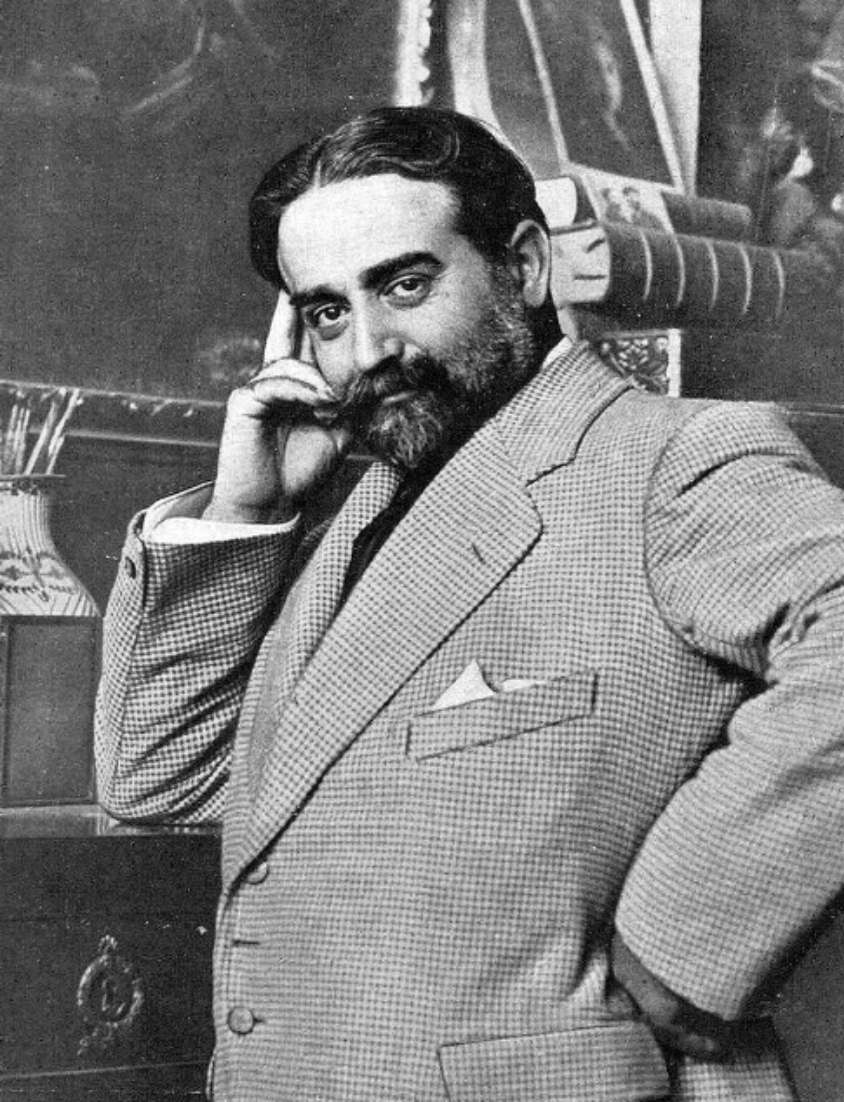
- 1915
- Born: Carlos Vázquez Úbeda; 31 December 1869; Ciudad Real, Spain
- Died: 31 August 1944 (aged 74); Barcelona, Spain

Carlos Vázquez Úbeda (31 December 1869, Ciudad Real – 31 August 1944, Barcelona) was a Spanish painter, illustrator and poster artist.

== Biography ==
His father, Antonio Zoilo Vázquez was a journalist and politician; the son of General Fernando Vázquez Orcall. His first drawing lessons came from his mother, Matilde. Later, he attended the Escuela Especial de Pintura in Madrid, where he studied with the landscape painter, Carlos de Haes. Thanks to a scholarship from the Provincial Deputation of Ciudad Real, he was able to study in France and Italy; settling in Paris and working with Léon Bonnat.

In 1892, he received his first official recognition at the National Exhibition of Fine Arts and, the following year, was awarded a medal at the Exposition des Beaux-Arts de Rouen. Beginning in 1895, he exhibited at the Salon. In 1896, he accompanied Daniel Urrabieta Vierge on a trip through La Mancha, to create illustrations for Don Quixote, then went to Venice to fulfill several commissions; including portraits of Carlos, Duke of Madrid, and his family, for which he was honored with the title of "court painter".

Mossos d'Esquadra

By 1898, he had established himself in Barcelona and become associated with the group of artists who gathered at Els Quatre Gats; such as Ramón Casas, Santiago Rusiñol and Pablo Picasso. It was then that he began creating poster designs and illustrations for numerous periodicals; notably Blanco y Negro, Pèl & Ploma, La Ilustración Artística and La Esfera. In 1901, he married Matilde Garriga Corones, from a prominent Barcelona family, and was presented with a wedding portrait by Joaquín Sorolla.

He had his first solo exhibition at the Sala Parés in 1903. Over the next few years, he had several showings at the Salon and, in 1906, was named a Knight in the Order of Alfonso XII, for his work depicting members of the Mossos d'Esquadra (Catalan police force) arresting a Romani couple. In 1908 his painting, "La Suegra" (The Mother-in-Law), was shown at the Salon and purchased by William Randolph Hearst. Two years later, he received a First Class prize at the National Exhibition for "The Wounded Torero". Shortly after, his "Honeymoon in the Ansó Valley" was acquired by Archer Milton Huntington, for the Hispanic Society of America. He became a member of that society in 1914.

In 1915, he was elected President of the Reial Cercle Artístic de Barcelona. That same year, he was awarded a gold medal at the Panama-Pacific International Exhibition in San Francisco. After that time, his wife began suffering from an illness that left her paralyzed, and he stopped exhibiting internationally, but increased his activity within Spain; culminating in a solo exhibition at the Museo de Arte Moderno in 1928.

The Wounded Torero

He was appointed professor of decorative composition at the Escola d'Arts i Oficis de Barcelona in 1936 and held a showing in Caracas, Venezuela; his first overseas since 1925. Shortly after, at the beginning of the Spanish Civil War, his studio was looted, resulting in the loss of numerous documents and works. Early in 1937 he, his wife, and his daughter fled to Marseille. Eventually, they settled in Villefranche-sur-Mer, in a home owned by the artist, Raquel Meller. During this period, he was very prolific, selling his works in Paris and Oslo, where he also had a solo exhibit.

They returned to Spain in 1938, and settled in Seville, where he painted a portrait of the notorious military commander, Gonzalo Queipo de Llano. After the war, they returned to Barcelona. One of his first works there involved a commission for decorations in the clinic of the famed ophthalmologist, Ignacio Barraquer. In 1944, he was named an Academician at the Real Academia de Bellas Artes de San Fernando. He died later that year, of a heart attack, while painting in his studio.
