= Theatre productions of Dan Leno =

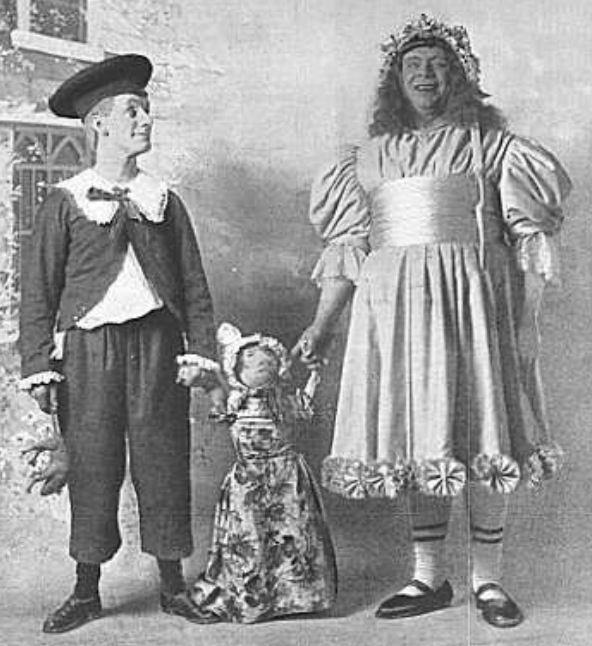
Dan Leno and Herbert Campbell in 1897

Dan Leno (20 December 1860 – 31 October 1904) was an English comedian and stage actor of the Victorian and Edwardian eras, known for performing in music hall. As a child, he was known for his clog dancing, and in his teen years, he became the star of his family's music hall act throughout Britain. He was an increasingly popular solo artist during the late 1880s and 1890s. He also performed in pantomimes and a few Victorian burlesques and comic plays and musicals, especially in the last two decades of his career.

Leno's first theatre appearance (as distinguished from music hall) was in pantomime in Liverpool in 1865, where he had a supporting part as a juvenile clown in Fortunatus; or, The Magic Wishing Cap alongside his parents, who appeared as "Mr and Mrs Leno – Comic Duettists". Leno earned wider theatrical notice as Dame Durden in a pantomime Jack and the Beanstalk at London's Surrey Theatre in 1886, having been spotted singing "Going to Buy Milk" by the theatre's manager. The piece was a success, and Leno received rave reviews; as a result, he was booked to star as Tinpanz the Tinker in the following year's pantomime, Sinbad and the Little Old Man of the Sea; or, The Tinker, the Tailor, the Soldier, the Sailor, Apothecary, Ploughboy, Gentleman Thief. The Era reported that Leno "made a capital Tinker, full of drollery and grotesque business."

Leno as a dame, by Alfred Bryan, 1890s

Sinbad brought Leno to the attention of Augustus Harris, the manager of the Theatre Royal, Drury Lane, one of the largest London theatres, which staged elaborate pantomime spectacles every Christmas. Harris offered Leno a role in the theatre's 1888 Christmas pantomime, Babes in the Wood. One critic wrote that "'the cake' for frolicsome humour is taken by the dapper new-comer, Mr. Dan Leno, who is sketched as the galvanic baroness in the wonderfully amusing dance which sets the house in a roar. The substantial "babes", Mr. Herbert Campbell and Mr. Harry Nicholls, would have no excuse if they did not vie in drollery with the light footed Dan Leno." Babes was a triumph: the theatre reported record attendance, and the run was extended until 27 April 1889. Leno went on to star in a total of 16 Christmas pantomimes at Drury Lane from 1888 to 1904. In 15 of these, he played alongside Herbert Campbell, a veteran pantomime performer, with Leno playing predominantly dame roles. Leno became famous for his characterisations of dame roles, and he was described as the "precursor of contemporary pantomime dames".

Leno also performed in a few other theatre productions during his career, including burlesques and musical comedies, while continuing to perform in his own popular music hall act, in London and on tour in the British provinces. By 1902, he had become an alcoholic and had begun to decline physically and mentally; he was briefly admitted to a mental asylum in 1903 and, upon his release later that year, played in only one more production. Leno died the following year, aged 43.

== Productions ==
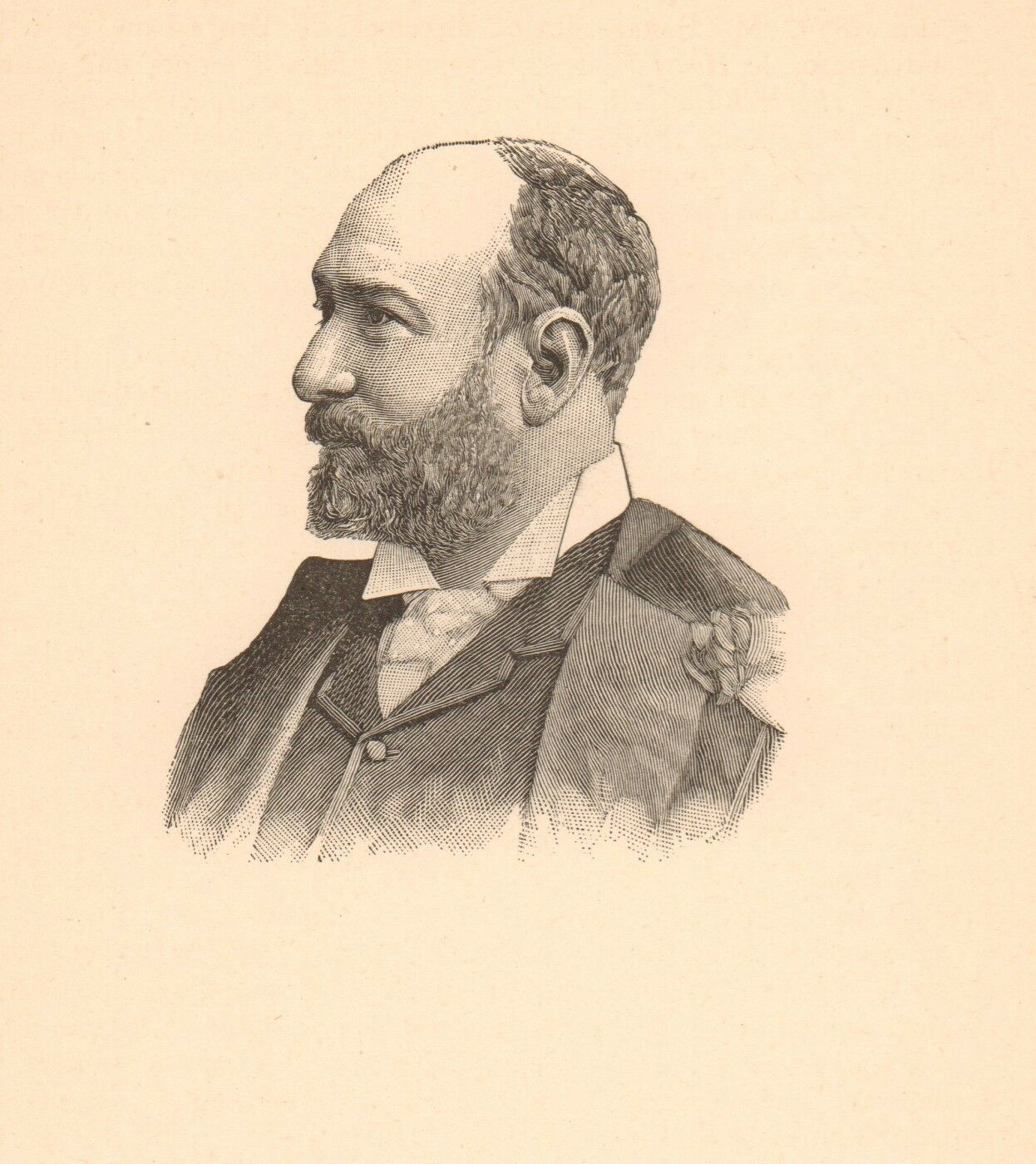
Augustus Harris

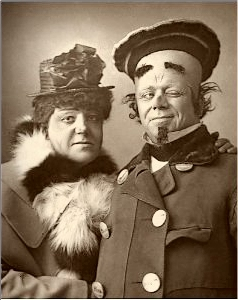
Leno's co-stars Nicholls and Campbell

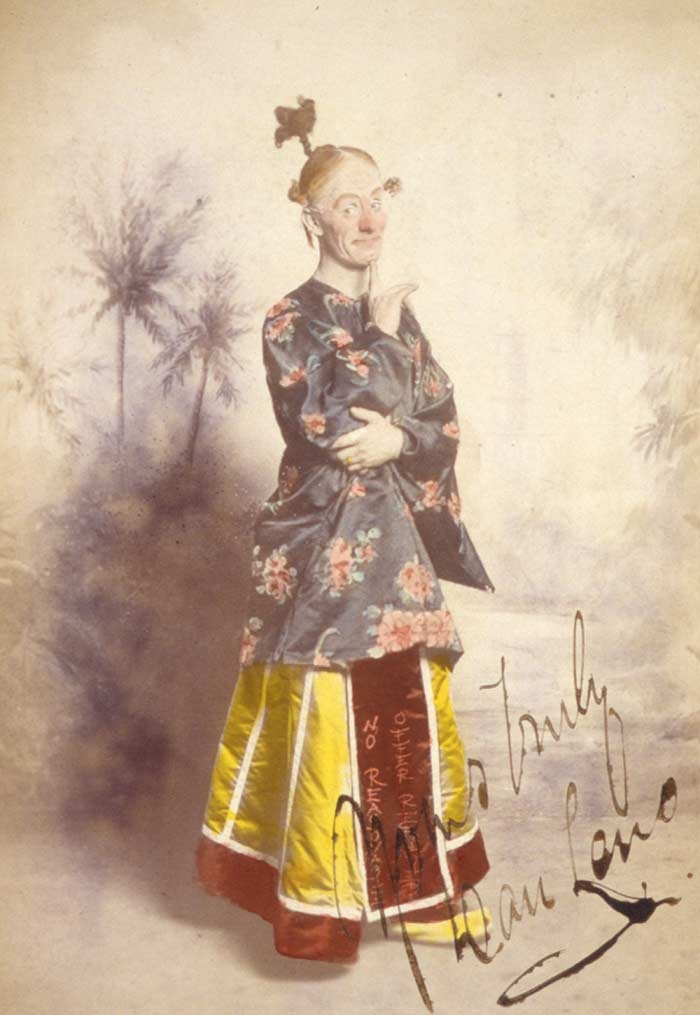
Leno as Widow Twankey, 1896

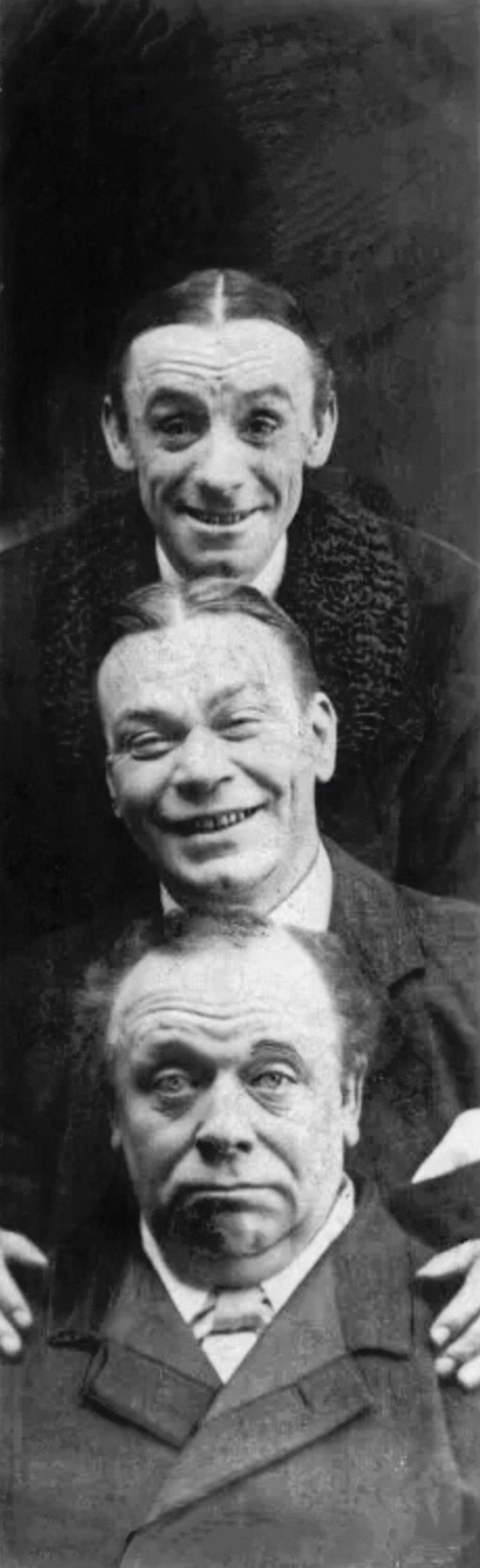
Leno (top) and Johnny Danvers, c. 1898, with Drury Lane co-star Herbert Campbell (bottom)

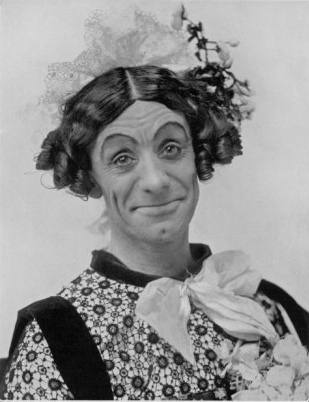
Leno as Dame Trot, 1899

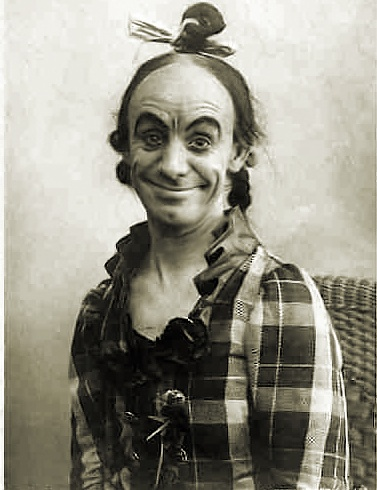
Leno as Sister Anne, 1901

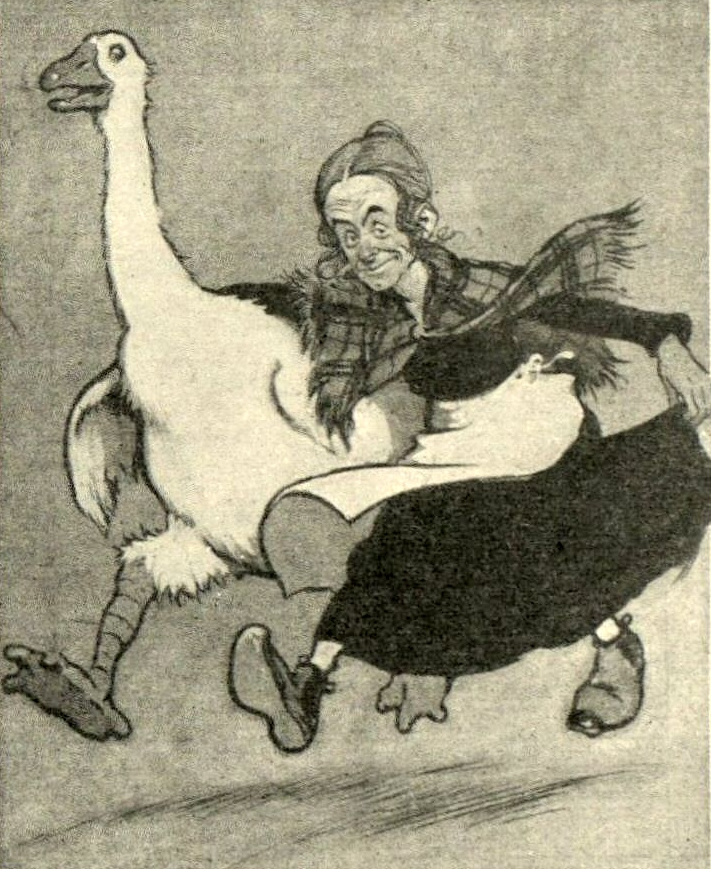
An illustration of Leno as Mother Goose, 1903

Date	Production	Genre	Role	Theatre	Notes
18 Dec 1865	Fortunatus; or, The Magic Wishing Cap	Pantomime	Juvenile clown	Royal Colosseum, Liverpool	Leno's first recorded theatrical performance; he appeared in the harlequinade, while his parents, Louisa and Will, played the principal boy Fortunatus and Ursa Major Britain, respectively. His parents were billed as "Mr and Mrs Leno – Comic Duettists". The music hall comic Harry Liston was also in the cast.
18 Jan 1869	Old King Humpty; or, Harlequin Emerald Isle and Katty of Killarney	Pantomime	Various	Monsters Saloon, Crampton Court, Dublin	By Will Leno. Performed during a tour of Ireland; young Dan Leno received praise from Charles Dickens, who was in the audience and told him: "Good little man, you'll make headway!"
22 Jan 1870	Jack the Giant Killer; or, Harlequin Grim Gosling, or the Good Fairy Queen of the Golden Pine Grove	Pantomime	Jack the Giant Killer	Rotunda Music Hall, Liverpool	By Will Leno. The Lenos also featured in the variety entertainment that preceded the pantomime, which offered Dan Leno a chance to "demonstrate his all-round talents".
26 Dec 1886	Jack and the Beanstalk, which grew to the moon; or, the Giant, Jack Frost and the Ha-Ha Balloon	Pantomime	Dame Durden	Surrey	By George Augustus Conquest and Henry Spry. Leno and his wife Lydia were jointly paid £20 a week.
26 Dec 1887	Sinbad and the Little Old Man of the Sea; or, The Tinker, the Tailor, the Soldier, the Sailor, Apothecary, Ploughboy, Gentleman Thief	Pantomime	Tinpaz	Surrey	By George Conquest and Henry Spry. Co-starring Leno's wife Lydia, the pantomime was the last of Conquest's performances.
2 Apr 1888	Two Lovely Black-Eyed Susan	Burlesque	Susan	Strand	By Horace Lennard. This reworking of the F. C. Burnand burlesque, The Latest Edition of Black-Eyed Susan; or, the Little Bill that Was Taken Up, was not well received. However, The Entr'acte called Leno's dancing "quite phenomenal".
Nov 1888	Atalanta	Burlesque	Leontes	Strand	Opened on 17 November, with Leno joining at the end of the month.
26 Dec 1888	Babes in the Wood	Pantomime	Baroness	Drury Lane	By Augustus Harris. Co-starring E. L. Blanchard and Harry Nicholls.
9 May 1889	Penelope	Comic opera	Pitcher	Comedy	By George P. Hawtrey (words) and Edward Solomon (music).
26 Dec 1889	Jack and the Beanstalk; or, Harlequin and the Midwinter Night's Dream	Pantomime	Mrs. Simpson	Drury Lane	By Augustus Harris and Harry Nicholls. Nicholls and Campbell played King and Queen.
26 Dec 1890	Beauty and the Beast	Pantomime	Mr. Lombarde Streete	Drury Lane	By W. Yardley and Augustus Harris. Nicholls and Campbell both played dame roles.
26 Dec 1891	Humpty Dumpty; or, Harlequin the Yellow Dwarf and the Fair One with the Golden Locks	Pantomime	Queen of Hearts	Drury Lane	By Harry Nicholls and Augustus Harris. Little Tich played the title role with Marie Lloyd as Princess Allfair and Fanny Leslie as King Dulcimar.
26 Dec 1892	Little Bo-Peep, Little Red Riding Hood and Hop o' My Thumb	Pantomime	Daddy Thumb	Drury Lane	By Augustus Harris and Wilton Jones, co-starring Marie Lloyd, Little Tich, Marie Loftus and Herbert Campbell. The pantomime received negative reviews from the press for its lengthy script, which was of the "roughest Cockney texture".
26 Dec 1893	Robinson Crusoe	Pantomime	Mrs. Crusoe	Drury Lane	By Augustus Harris and Harry Nicholls. The production co-starred Marie Lloyd as Polly Perkins and Little Tich as Man Friday.
26 Dec 1894	Dick Whittington	Pantomime	Idle Jack	Drury Lane	By Augustus Harris, Cecil Raleigh and Henry Hamilton. Herbert Campbell played the dame called Alice.
26 Dec 1895	Cinderella	Pantomime	Baroness	Drury Lane	By Augustus Harris, Cecil Raleigh and Arthur Sturgess. The lavish production included a carriage drawn by real horses and "the use of thousands of lights".
26 Dec 1896	Aladdin	Pantomime	Widow Twankey	Drury Lane	By Arthur Sturgess and H. Leonard. The production was considered to be one of the weakest of the Drury Lane pantomimes, but Leno's characterisation of Widow Twankey was admired as one of his finest Dame roles.
26 Dec 1897	The Babes in the Wood	Pantomime	Reggie	Drury Lane	By Arthur Sturgess and Arthur Collins. Herbert Campbell starred as the dame Chrissie.
1 Aug 1898	Orlando Dando, the Volunteer	Musical farce	Orlando Dando	The Grand Theatre, Fulham	By Basil Hood (words) and Walter Slaughter (music).
26 Dec 1898	The Forty Thieves	Pantomime	Abdallah	Drury Lane	By Arthur Sturgess and Arthur Collins. Herbert Campbell played The Fair Zuleika, and Leno's uncle, Johnny Danvers, played Ali Baba.
9 Oct 1899	In Gay Piccadilly!	Musical farce	Aubrey Honeybun	Theatre Royal, Glasgow	By George R. Sims (words) and Clarence Corri (music). A provincial tour followed.
26 Dec 1899	Jack and the Beanstalk	Pantomime	Dame Trot	Drury Lane	By Arthur Sturgess and Arthur Collins. Music by Walter Slaughter. Leno starred with Harry Nicholls, Herbert Campbell, Johnny Danvers and Charles Lauri.
26 Dec 1900	The Sleeping Beauty and the Beast	Pantomime	Queen Ravia	Drury Lane	By J. Hickory Wood and Arthur Collins.
26 Dec 1901	Bluebeard	Pantomime	Sister Anne	Drury Lane	By J. Hickory Wood and Arthur Collins. Leno starred opposite Herbert Campbell's Bluebeard.
21 July 1902	Mr. Wix of Wickham	Musical comedy	Mr. Wix	Stratford Borough Theatre	By Herbert Darnley, George Everard, Frank Seddon and Frank E. Tours. A provincial tour followed.
26 Dec 1902	Mother Goose	Pantomime	Mother Goose	Drury Lane	By J. Hickory Wood and Arthur Collins. The role was created for Leno.
26 Dec 1903	Humpty Dumpty	Pantomime	Queen Spritely	Drury Lane	By J. Hickory Wood and Arthur Collins.

Note: The source for Leno's stage performances, except as otherwise noted, is Barry Anthony, The Kings Jester, pp. 215–16.

== See also ==
- Songs, sketches and monologues of Dan Leno

== Sources ==
- Ackroyd, Peter (2007). Dan Leno & the Limehouse Golem. London: Vintage Publishing. ISBN 978-0-7493-9659-6.
- Anthony, Barry (2010). The King's Jester. London: I. B. Taurus & Co. ISBN 978-1-84885-430-7.
- Bolton, H. Philip (2000). Women Writers Dramatized: A Calendar of Performances from Narrative Works Published in English to 1900. London: Mansell Publishing. ISBN 0-7201-2117-5.
- Booth, Michael (1996). The Edwardian Theatre: Essays on Performance and the Stage. Cambridge: Cambridge University Press. ISBN 978-0-521-45375-2.
- Booth, Michael (1976). English Plays of the Nineteenth Century: Pantomimes, Extravaganzas, and Burlesques, vol. 5. Michigan: Clarendon Publishing. ISBN 978-0-19-812519-8.
- Brandreth, Gyles (1977). The Funniest Man on Earth: The Story of Dan Leno. London: Hamish Hamilton. ISBN 978-0-241-89810-9.
- Disher, M.W. (1942). Fairs, Circuses and Music Halls. London: William Collins. OCLC 604161468.
- Newton, H. Chance (1928). Idols of the Halls. London: Heath Cranton. ASIN B00087ABNQ.
- Taylor, Millie (2007). British Pantomime Performance. Bristol: Intellect Books. ISBN 978-1-84150-987-7.
- Zarrilli, Philip. B; Bruce A. McConachie; Gary Jay Williams Thorn (eds) (2006). Theatre Histories: An Introduction. Oxford: Routledge. ISBN 978-0-415-46223-5.
