= Marie Loftus =

British music hall entertainer of the late Victorian era

- Born: November 24, 1857; Glasgow, Scotland
- Died: December 7, 1940 (aged 83); London, England
- Occupation: Music hall entertainer
- Spouse: Benjamin Brown (1848–1926)
- Children: Cissie Loftus (1876–1943)

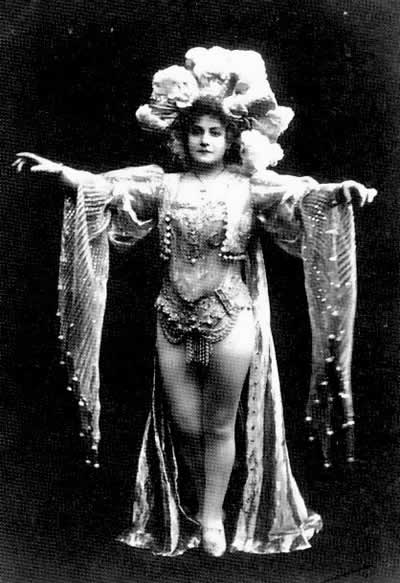
Marie Loftus c. 1897

Marie Loftus (24 November 1857 – 7 December 1940) was a British music hall entertainer of the late Victorian era often billed as "The Sarah Bernhardt of the Music Halls" and "The Hibernian Hebe". She became one of the leading stars of music hall from the 1880s to World War I.

== Biography ==
Loftus was born in Glasgow in Scotland in 1857 to Irish parents. Her early years were spent living near to the Scotia Music Hall where she danced as a young girl. Her first appearance was at Brown's Royal Music Hall in her native city in 1874 before moving south to the Oxford Music Hall in London in 1877. Here she became known as "The Sarah Bernhardt of the Music Halls" and quickly became a popular performer leading to tours of the United States and South Africa. By the end of the 19th century she was earning the then immense sum of £100 a week.

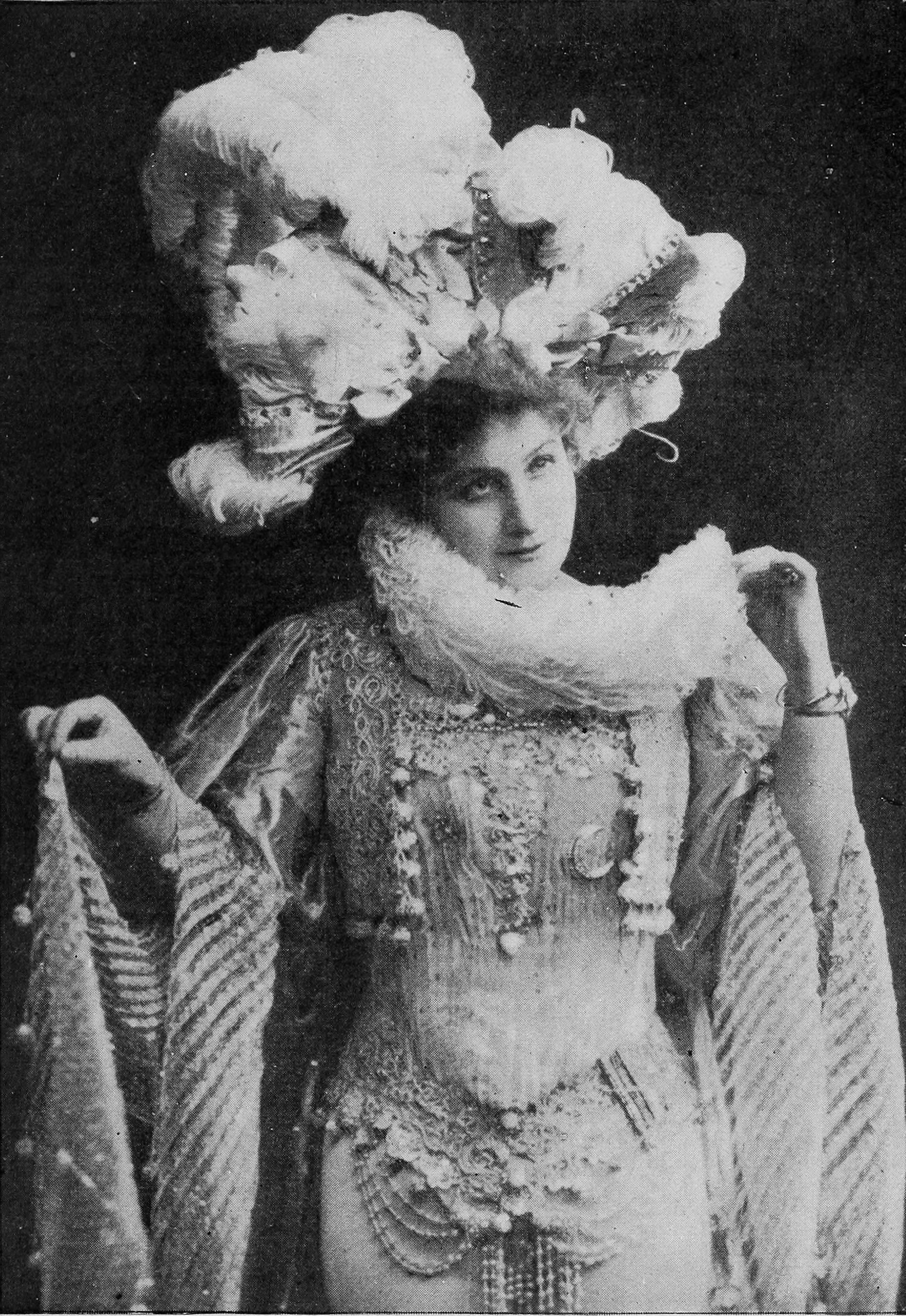
Marie Loftus in costume c. 1896

In her native Glasgow Loftus was incredibly popular, and this was reciprocated in her many charitable acts in the city. While appearing at the Britannia Music Hall in Glasgow in 1894 she bought 150 pairs of boots for the poorest children in the city. As a pantomime principal boy she wore costumes that enhanced her buxom figure; this was displayed to great effect when Loftus played the title role in Robinson Crusoe at the Theatre Royal, Glasgow in 1889 and 1900, and Sindbad the Sailor in 1895. Such was her fame that in 1892 Loftus appeared in the popular Theatre Royal, Drury Lane pantomime alongside Marie Lloyd, Ada Blanche, Dan Leno, Herbert Campbell and Mabel Love.

Making the most of her Scottish and Irish background, Loftus' act ranged from Scottish songs and Irish songs such as "Kilkenny Kate" to more coquettish songs like "Sister Mary wants to Know". Such risqué numbers occasionally attracted criticism such as that from a critic in the 1890s Glasgow magazine The Quiz who wrote: "A man in the pit last night thought some of them were 'no verra proper'". Perhaps as a result of this criticism, when performing at the Britannia Music Hall in Glasgow in 1894 her contract stipulated that the management had the right to stipulate which songs and material she would perform and that she would obey the stage manager "in all matters concerning the Stage, Encores, or Addressing the Audience" and should conduct herself "soberly and respectably." Loftus was more famous for such sentimental ballads as "One Touch of Nature Makes the Whole World Kin".

An attractive woman with the hour-glass figure popular at the time, she became a favourite pin-up beauty among young men during the 1880s and 1890s. Loftus married Benjamin Brown (1848–1926), part of the successful variety group, Brown, Newland & Le Clerc. The 1891 census lists the couple as living at 20 Trent Road in Lambeth with Loftus recorded as a "Music Hall Artist", while in 1901 they were living at 3 Maida Vale Mansion in Maida Vale in London. Their daughter, Marie Cecelia Brown (1876–1943), like her mother Glasgow-born, was herself a talented mimic and actress who found fame as Cissie Loftus, appearing on Broadway and the West End of London.

Marie Loftus died in London in December 1940 aged 83.
