= Songs, sketches and monologues of Dan Leno =

Dan Leno (20 December 1860 – 31 October 1904) was an English comedian and stage actor, famous for appearing in music hall, comic plays, pantomimes, Victorian burlesques and musical comedies, during the Victorian and Edwardian eras. He originated and popularised many songs, sketches and monologues in his music hall acts and made both sound and visual recordings of some of his work shortly before he died. Although brief, Leno's recording period (1901–1903) produced around thirty recordings on one-sided shellac discs using the early acoustic recording process. They were released by the Gramophone and Typewriter Company, one of the early recording companies, which became the parent organisation for the His Master's Voice label.

Before Leno's recording debut, music hall comedian Harry Bluff had recorded a number of Leno's songs, which were marketed by the Edison Bell Company in London in 1898. Leno was initially reluctant to adopt the new medium of sound recording, but he was eventually enticed into the studio with a lucrative commission of one shilling (£4.15 in 2012) per dozen discs sold. His records sold for five shillings each (£20.75 in 2012) and ran for three minutes. (Note: The cost of five shillings (£20.75 in 2012) for one song restricted the sales of Leno's recordings to wealthy people. Further, the ownership of a Gramophone was still considered to be a luxury.) Some of the recorded songs differed from Leno's music hall versions by being condensed to incorporate part of the sketch from which the song was taken. (Note: "Sketch", as used in these tables, means a combination of music and talking.) It is unknown how many discs were sold, because no record was ever kept of their sales. Despite the success of the recordings and the praise he received from the record distributors, Leno felt uncomfortable in the recording studio. In an interview for Pearson's Magazine in 1903, he stated: "How the dickens can I patter and warble to that thing. Can't a few of you come round and smile and clap a bit?"

In his music hall acts, Leno created characters based on observations mostly about life in London, including shopwalkers, grocer's assistants, beefeaters, huntsmen, racegoers, firemen, fathers, henpecked husbands, garrulous wives, pantomime dames, a police officer, a fireman and a hairdresser. For his London acts, Leno purchased songs from the foremost music hall writers and composers, including Harry King, who wrote many of Leno's early successes, Harry Dacre and Joseph Tabrar. From 1890, George Le Brunn composed the music to many of Leno's songs and sketches, including "The Detective", "My Old Man", "Chimney on Fire", "The Fasting Man", "The Jap", "All Through a Little Piece of Bacon" and "The Detective Camera". Le Brunn also wrote the music for three of Leno's best known sketches that depicted life in everyday occupations: "The Railway Guard" (1890), "The Shopwalker" and The Waiter" (both from 1891). Leno made 14 short films towards the end of his life, most as himself, and four as an actor. He generally portrayed a bumbling buffoon who struggles to carry out everyday tasks, such as riding a bicycle. In An Obstinate Cork (1902), one of Leno's few surviving films, he struggles to pull a cork out of a champagne bottle while on a picnic with his wife Lydia.

== Discography ==
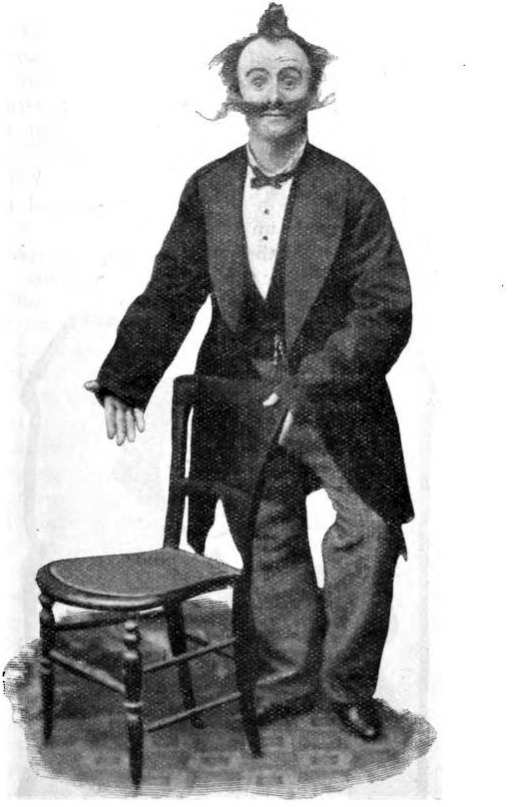
Leno as The Shopwalker, 1891

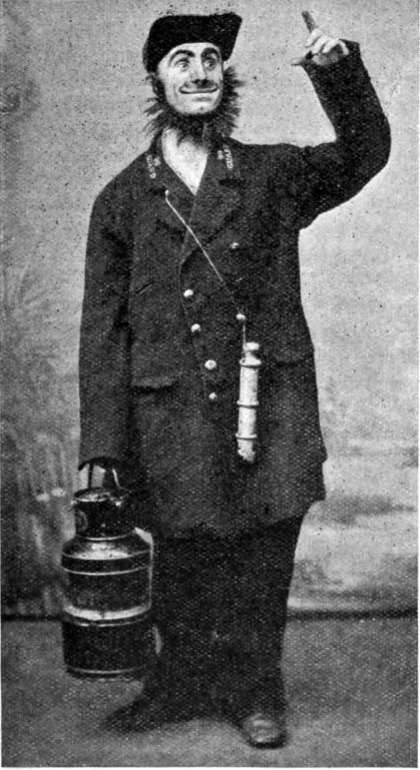
Leno as The Railway Guard, 1890

Recording number	Title	Year recorded	Issue number	Description
1066	"Who Does the House Belong To?"	1901	GC–2–2518	Sketch
1067	"The Mocking Bird"	1901	GC–1204	Sketch
1082	"The Tower of London"	1901	GC–2435	Sketch
1084	"The May Day Fireman"	1901	GC–2436	Sketch
1091	"Where Are You Going To, My Pretty Maid?"	1901	GC–2436	Song
1092	"My Wife's Relations"	1901	GC–1205	Monologue
1093	"The Huntsman"	1901	GC–2–2515	Sketch
1094	"The Grass Widower"	1901	GC–2–2516	Sketch
1095	"Clever Mr. Green"	1901	GC–2–2517	Sketch
1096	"McGlockell's Men"	1901	GC–1206	Sketch
1127	"Poppies"	1901	GC–2–2530	Song
1128	"Mrs. Kelly"	1901	GC–2–2531	Sketch
1129	"The Tower of London" (re-recorded)	1901	GC–2435	Sketch
3222/3	"The Hard Boiled Egg and the Wasp"	1903	GC–2–2807	Song
3224/5	"Going to the Races"	1903	GC–2–2808	Monologue
3462/3	"Spiritualism"	1903	GC–1243	Monologue
3478/9	"The Shopwalker"	1903	GC–2–2830	Sketch
3480/1	"The Muffin Man"	1903	GC–2–2831	Song
3484/5	"Wait Till I'm His Father"	1903	GC–2–2832	Sketch
3486/5	"The Lecturer"	1903	Unissued	Sketch
3487/8	"The Fortune Teller"	1903	GC–2–2854	Sketch
3489/90	"The Diamond Ring"	1903	GC–2–2833	Sketch
3491/2	"The Swimming Master"	1903	GC–2–2855	Sketch
3496/7	"Dan Leno's Clog Dance"	1903	Unissued	Monologue
43–R	"I Am Waiting for Him Tonight"	1903	02006	Sketch
46–R	"The Robin"	1903	01000	Monologue
47–R	"Going to the Races" (re-recording)	1903	02001	Monologue
50–R	"The Huntsman" (re-recording)	1903	02005	Sketch
23117	"Young Men Taken In and Done For"	1903	Unissued	Sketch

Note: Leno's recordings are listed in Gyles Brandreth's 1977 biography, The Funniest Man on Earth: The Story of Dan Leno.

== Unrecorded songs, sketches and monologues ==
Leno and his wife, Lydia, in a home-made film, An Obstinate Cork, 1902

Year performed	Title	Notes	Description
1876	"Pity the Poor Italian Boy"	First performed in Ireland under his stage name The Great Little Leno, the Quintessence of Irish Comedians.	Song
1878	"Pongo the Monkey"	First presented at Pullan's Theatre of Varieties, Brunswick Place, Bradford.	Sketch
1878	"Torpedo Bill"	Follow up sketch to Pongo the Monkey, first presented at Pullan's Theatre of Varieties, Brunswick Place, Bradford.	Sketch
1881	"A Nobleman in Disguise"	Performed alongside The Leno Family at the People's Music Hall in Manchester.	Sketch
1882	"I'm the Champion Still"	First performed at the Scotia Theatre, Glasgow.	Song
1884	"Sweet Black Pairs"	Performed during the Christmas pantomime Dick Whittington.	Song
1885	"Don't Lean Against a House that's Pulled Down"	Written by Leno. First performed at the Parthenon Theatre, Liverpool.	Song
1885	"Gaffer Goliker"	Written by Leno and first performed at Parthenon Theatre, Liverpool.	Song
c.1885	"When Rafferty Raffled His Watch"	First performed in Leno's London debut.	Song
1886	"I'm Off to Buy Milk for the Twins"	First performed at the Oxford Theatre, London.	Song
1887	"It's More Than a Fellow Can Stand"	First performed at the Forester's music hall, London.	Song
1886	"The Fish Shop"	First performed at the Oxford Theatre, London.	Song
1888	"Young Men Taken In and Done For"	Written and composed by Harry King.	Song
1888	"I'll Be Waiting for Him Tonight"	Written by Leno.	Song
1888	"Has Anyone Seen a Moving Job?"	First monologue, written by Leno.	Song
1888	"My Old Man"	Composed by George Le Brunn, words by Harry King.	Song
1889	"The Muffin Man"	Written and composed by Harry King. Leno's first "trade song".	Song
1889	"Dear Old Mike"	First performed at the Empire Theatre, London.	Song
1890	"Never More"	Sketch written by Leno based on his early life touring. Leno sung the title song as the character Mr. Girkling. Words by Harry King, music by George Le Brunn.	Sketch
1890	"Her Mother's at the Bottom of It All"	Written by Leno and sung in the character of Mr. Pipkins.	Song
1890	"The Railway Guard"	Composed by George Le Brunn. Leno's second "trade song".	Sketch
1890	"Mother Nature"	Performed during the Christmas pantomime Jack and the Beanstalk.	Song
1891	"The Shop Walker"	Composed by George Le Brunn, words by Walter de Frece, another "trade song".	Sketch
1891	"The Waiter"	Trade song, composed by George Le Brunn.	Sketch
1891	"The Grass Widower"	Composed by J.H. Woodhouse.	Sketch
1892	"All Through a Little Piece of Bacon"	Composed by George Le Brunn.	Song
1892	"Chimney on Fire"	Composed by George Le Brunn.	Song
1892	"The Detective"	Composed by George Le Brunn.	Sketch
1892	"The Detective Camera"	Composed by George Le Brunn.	Song
1892	"The Fasting Man"	Composed by George Le Brunn.	Song
1893	"The Doctor"	Featuring Leno's character Dr. McFabback.	Sketch
1893	"The Recruiting Sergeant"	Words by Harry Wright, music by Fred Eplett. Leno performed as the character Sergeant Smirks.	Sketch
1893	"The Midnight March"	Performed during the production Little Bo-Peep, Little Red Riding Hood and Hop O' My Thumb.	Song
1893	"My Sweet Face"	Written and composed by Herbert Darnley for the Christmas pantomime Robinson Crusoe.	Song
1895	"Mary Anne's Refused Me"	Written by Leno about how to avoid marriage.	Sketch
1897	"Courting the Widow"	Written by Leno for his American audiences.	Song
1897	"The Horseshoe on the Door"	Written by Leno for his American audiences.	Song
1897	"The North Pole"	Written by Leno for his American audiences.	Song
1897	"Our Nineteenth Century Stores"	Sung in the style of Leno's inspiration Joseph Grimaldi. Leno dedicated this song to him.	Song
1898	"I'll Marry Him"	Featuring Leno's character Mrs. Kelly.	Song
1898	"The Swimming Instructor"	Written by Leno. Later recorded as "The Swimming Master" in 1903.	Song
1898	"The Beefeater"	Written by Leno. Capitalising on the success of this, Leno recorded "Tower of London" in 1901.	Sketch
1899	"The Diamond Ring"	Written by Leno about a manual worker who came into a lot of money. Later recorded in 1903.	Song
c.1899	"The Jap"	Composed by George Le Brunn.	Sketch
c.1899	"McFarlane's Men"	Written by Leno about Scotland.	Song
1899	"The Red Poppies"	Written by Leno. Later recorded as "Poppies" in 1901.	Sketch
1899	"The Bandit"	First performed at the London Pavilion.	Song
1899	"The Red Robin"	Written by Leno. Later recorded as "The Robin" in 1903.	Monologue
1899	"The Funny Little Nigger"	Performed on a single occasion at the London Pavilion as part of the Doo-da-Day Minstrels; an act composed of Johnny Danvers, Herbert Campbell, Bransby Williams, Joe Elvin, Eugene Stratton, Fred McNaughton and Harry Randall.	Song
1900	"The Huntsman"	The last of his "trade songs", performed at the Empire Theatre, London.	Sketch
1901	"My Wife's Relations"	Written by Leno about his family.	Monologue
1902	"The Wasp and the Hardboiled Egg"	Written by Leno, performed during Mother Goose in 1903. Inspired by "The Honeysuckle and the Bee" as performed by Ellaline Terriss.	Song
1904	"The Widow with Memories of Friday Nights"	First performed at the London Pavilion.	Song

== Sources ==
- Anthony, Barry (2010). The King's Jester. London: I. B. Taurus & Co. ISBN 978-1-84885-430-7.
- Bennett, John. R (1978). A catalogue of vocal recordings from the English catalogues of the Gramophone Company 1898 - 1899, the Gramophone Company Limited 1899 – 1900, the Gramophone & Typewriter Company Limited 1901–1907 and the Gramophone Company Limited 1907 – 1925. Westport: Greenwood Press. ISBN 978-0-313-20237-7.
- Brandreth, Gyles (1977). The Funniest Man on Earth: The Story of Dan Leno. London: Hamish Hamilton. ISBN 978-0-241-89810-9.
- Newton, H. Chance (1928). Idols of the Halls. London: Heath Cranton. ASIN B00087ABNQ.
- Street, Sarah (1997). British National Cinema. New York: Routledge. ISBN 978-0-415-38421-6.
