= Agnes Fraser =

Scottish actress and soprano

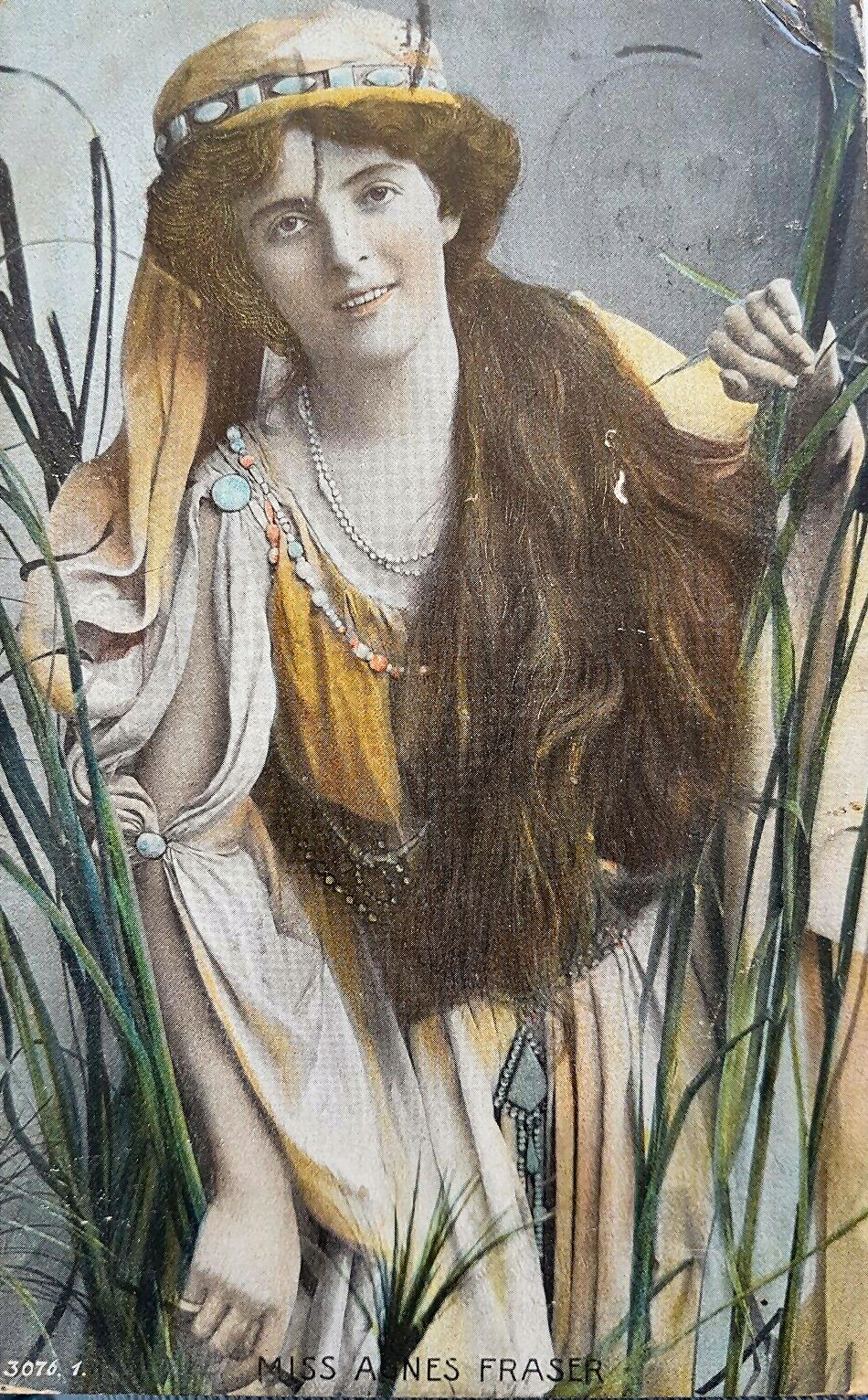
Agnes Fraser (c. 1905 postcard)

Agnes Fraser Elder Fraser-Smith (8 November 1876 – 22 July 1968) was a Scottish actress and soprano, known as Agnes Fraser, who appeared in the later Savoy Operas and in Edwardian musical comedy. She married the Gilbert and Sullivan performer Walter Passmore, with whom she frequently appeared on stage.

== Early life and career ==
Fraser was born in Springfield, Fife, Scotland as Agnes Fraser Elder Fraser-Smith in 1876. Her brother was the actor Alec Fraser. In 1911 her sister, Mary Smith, known by the stage name Mary Fraser, married the actor Huntley Wright.

Fraser made her professional début with a D'Oyly Carte Opera Company touring company in the chorus of The Vicar of Bray, The Lucky Star and Haddon Hall from December 1898 to September 1899. She then moved to the main D'Oyly Carte company at the Savoy Theatre in London, where she appeared in The Rose of Persia (1899–1900), taking over the small role of "Blush-of-Morning" from Isabel Jay, and occasionally playing the lead role of the Sultana during Jay's temporary absence; the 1900 revival of The Pirates of Penzance as Isabel, understudying Jay as Mabel and going on in that role in September 1900; the revival of Patience as Lady Ella (1900 – 1901); The Emerald Isle as Kathleen, occasionally going on for Jay as Lady Rose Pippin (1901); the first revival of Iolanthe as Celia (1901); and The Willow Pattern as Ah Mee (1901–1902). When Isabel Jay left the company, Fraser replaced her as the lead soprano, originating the role of Bessie Throckmorton in Merrie England at the Savoy Theatre in 1902 and then on tour. Her last role at the Savoy was Kenna in A Princess of Kensington, from January 1903, and on tour until September.

== Post-D'Oyly Carte and later years ==
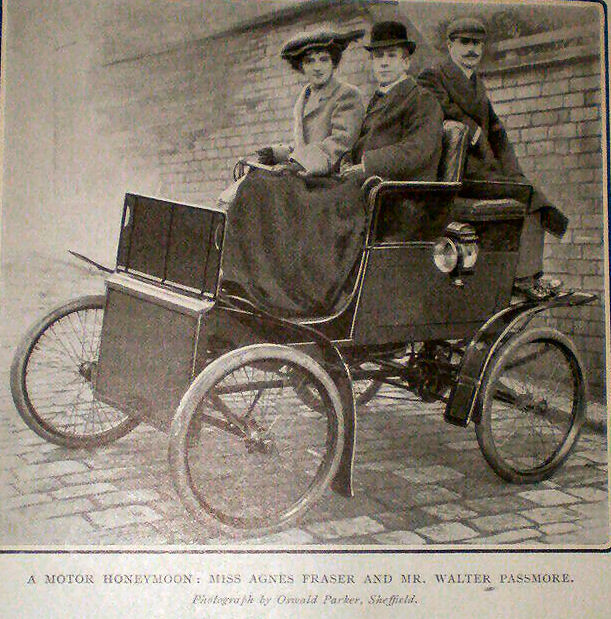
The newly-wed Fraser and Walter Passmore in their motorcar (The Sketch, 1902)

She married the company's leading comedian, Walter Passmore, in Wandsworth, London, in 1902. In addition to Passmore's four children from his first marriage, the couple had four children of their own: Henry Fraser Passmore (1905–1987, a general manager of Hammer films 1935–37); John Fraser Passmore (1908–1973); Nancie A. Passmore (1910–1990), who married tenor Joseph Hislop; and Isobel Mary Fraser Passmore (1913–1992). The newlyweds enjoyed all the trappings of stardom, being photographed in 1902 in their motorcar and taking part together in a publicity campaign for rail travel.

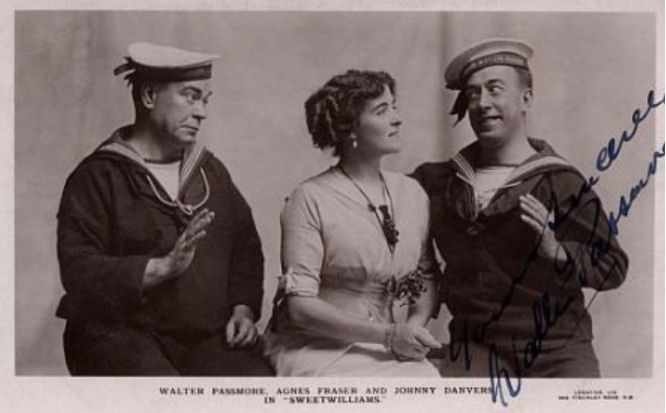
In Sweet Williams (1911–12) with Johnny Danvers (left) and Passmore

Fraser and Passmore then left the company and she played Elphin Haye in The Earl and the Girl opposite his Jim Cheese at the Adelphi Theatre and later at the Lyric Theatre (1903–1904). Also at the Adelphi she played the Princess in the fairy pantomime Little Hans Andersen (December 1903 to January 1904). She appeared in various Edwardian musical comedies, including as Ellaline Lewin in The Talk of the Town, by Seymour Hicks and Charles H. Taylor, composed by Herbert Haines, at the Lyric (1905); Winifred in the farcical musical comedy The Dairymaids, composed by Paul Rubens and Frank E. Tours, at the Apollo Theatre (1906), and others at the Theatre Royal, Drury Lane in 1907. She toured the provinces with Passmore from 1911 to 1915 including in the musical farcical sketch Sweet Williams (1911–12) with Johnny Danvers. She was then living with her husband and their children and Passmore's daughters Doris and Mirette Passmore from his first marriage.

By 1939 she was living a rather more modest retirement life with her husband and stockbroker son John Passmore at Heath Mews at The Mount in Hampstead, London.

== Death ==
Fraser died in London in 1968. She left an estate valued at £28,995.
