= J. Hickory Wood =

English playwright, novelist and biographer

Jay Hickory Wood (died 26 August 1913, Purley, Kent) was an English playwright, novelist, and biographer. Born in Manchester, he was best known as the author of many pantomimes; several of them written in collaboration with Arthur Collins. His first pantomime performed in London's West End was Puss'n Boots at the Garrick Theatre in 1899. He wrote new pantomimes for the Theatre Royal, Drury Lane, in 13 consecutive seasons. Several of these were adapted into musicals produced on Broadway by Klaw and Erlanger, including The Sleeping Beauty and the Beast (1901) and Mother Goose (1903).

Wood was a biographer of the actor Dan Leno, and his book Dan Leno was published in 1905 by Methuen Publishing. His books included the novels The Chronicles of Mr. Pottersby (1898) and Coronation Chuckles (1911), and the short story collection Recitations: Comic and Otherwise (1898).
