= Dame Durden =

Traditional English folk song

Dame Durden is a traditional English folk song and children's rhyme (Roud Folk Song Index 1209), dating to the early nineteenth century. Best known in versions collected across southern England, the song describes the cheerful household of “Dame Durden”, who keeps five serving maids and five labouring men, all of whom pair off playfully on Valentine’s Day morning. The piece has remained in oral tradition and is widely associated with the Copper Family of Sussex. The name “Dame Durden” was also used in 19th-century literature and pantomime as a stock nickname for a kindly housekeeper or matron.

== History, text and form ==
The earliest securely dated printed text appears in The Vocal Library (1822), which includes a version very close to that sung by later traditional singers. The song circulated widely in rural England during the 19th century and was later collected by folklorists and musicologists.

In the Roud Folk Song Index, the song is classified as Roud 1209, which gathers collected versions under a single family of related texts and melodies.

The standard form of the song consists of short narrative verses followed by a long, repetitive chorus enumerating the maids and men. Many versions list five maidservants (such as Moll, Bet, Doll, Kate, and Joan) and five male workers (commonly Tom, Dick, Joe, Jack, and Humphrey), who exchange kisses in comic sequence "on the morn of Valentine".

Because the song circulated orally for over a century, spellings, names, and lines differ among regional variants. Several printed and archived texts survive in 19th-century folk collections.

== Variants and recordings ==
Several notable traditional and revival recordings exist, including:

- The Copper Family – one of the most influential source versions; the family's Sussex variant is widely reproduced in folk collections. Bob and Ron Copper recorded the song on mid-twentieth-century albums documenting the Copper repertoire.
- Silly Sisters (Maddy Prior and June Tabor) – released a well-known revival-era rendition under the spelling Dame Durdan.

Additional collected variants appear in Vaughan Williams Memorial Library manuscript collections and field recordings from southern England.

== Other uses of the name ==
=== Literature ===
The name "Dame Durden" appears in Victorian literature as a humorous or affectionate nickname for a capable female housekeeper. Most notably, the term is used in Charles Dickens's Bleak House (1853) as a nickname for the novel's hardworking heroine Esther Summerson.

The Australian novelist and children's literature writer Ethel Turner (1872–1958) wrote children's columns for the Illustrated Sydney News and later for the Australian Town and Country Journal under the pen name "Dame Durden".

=== Pantomime ===
"Dame Durden" was also adopted in 19th-century British pantomime as a stock pantomime dame-role name. Theatre histories record its use in comic matron characters, sometimes in association with prominent music-hall performers such as Dan Leno.
