= Johnny Danvers =

English music hall comedian and actor (1860–1939)

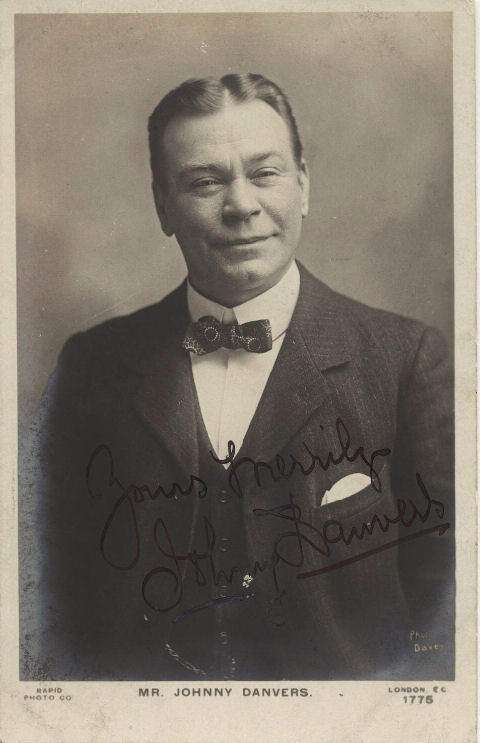
- Danvers c.1904
- Born: John Danvers Harold; December 1860; Sheffield, Yorkshire, U.K.
- Died: 1 April 1939 (aged 78); Brixton, London, U.K.
- Resting place: Streatham Park Cemetery, Streatham Vale
- Occupations: Actor, comedian
- Years active: 1865–1925
- Spouse: Emily Rosetta King (m. 1895)

Johnny Danvers (born John Danvers Harold; December 1860 – 1 April 1939) was an English actor, comedian and music hall performer who made a number of appearances in the annual pantomime at the Theatre Royal, Drury Lane in the late 19th and early 20th-centuries, usually with his nephew Dan Leno.

== Early life ==
Danvers was born in Sheffield, Yorkshire, to Charles Dutton Harold (1843-1880) and Elizabeth Ann (née Calow; 1848-1894). The family moved to Glasgow when Danvers was young, but had returned to Sheffield by 1881, where he took a job as a he "silver plater".

== Dan Leno ==
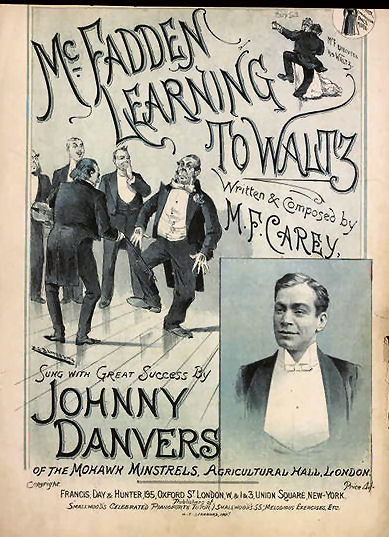
Sheetmusic cover for "Mc.Fadden Learning to Waltz", sung by Danvers (c. 1890)

In 1865 Dan Leno and his brother, Henry, formed a clog dancing double act known as "The Great Little Lenos". Although initially successful, the brothers experienced many bouts of unemployment and often busked outside London pubs to make a living.

Tired of surviving on little or no money, Henry took up a trade in London and was replaced intermittently in the act by Danvers, who was the boys' uncle. Similar in age, Leno and Danvers had a close relationship.

== Stage career ==
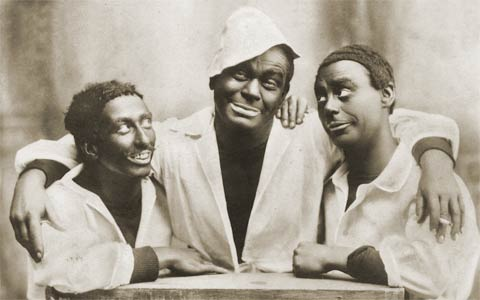
Arthur Gallimore, Johnny Danvers and F. Lynne in blackface with Moore & Burgess's Minstrels c.1901

In the 1885 pantomime at the Surrey Theatre, London, Danvers played Silly Billy in Robinson Crusoe; in 1886 he and Leno toured the music halls of northern England in a sketch called The Wicklow Wedding; or, the Leprechaun's Revels, written by Leno's stepfather. For the piece, Danvers and Leno helped paint the scenery while Leno helped his mother make the costumes.

Danvers moved to London in 1884 where he quickly became prominent in minstrel shows, appearing in blackface with the Mohawk Minstrels, who sat in a half-circle exchanging jokes and with whom he performed the popular hits "Mc.Fadden Learning to Waltz", "I've Got the Ooperzootic", and "Hist! Here Comes the Bogeyman". He rose through the ranks of the troupe and became 'Mr. Tambo', who shared the comedy with the 'Mr. Interlocuter' of Harry Hunter and the 'Mr. Bones' of Johnny Schofield. He later appeared with the more famous Moore & Burgess's Minstrels.

Other songs Danvers popularised included "I Had No Luck That Day" and "I Know A Gal Dat Lubs A Coon" (1904).

In 1895, in London, Danvers married Emily Rosetta King (1869-1955).

In 1898 Leno, Herbert Campbell and Danvers formed a consortium to build the Granville Theatre in Fulham; the theatre was demolished in 1971.

== Drury Lane and after ==
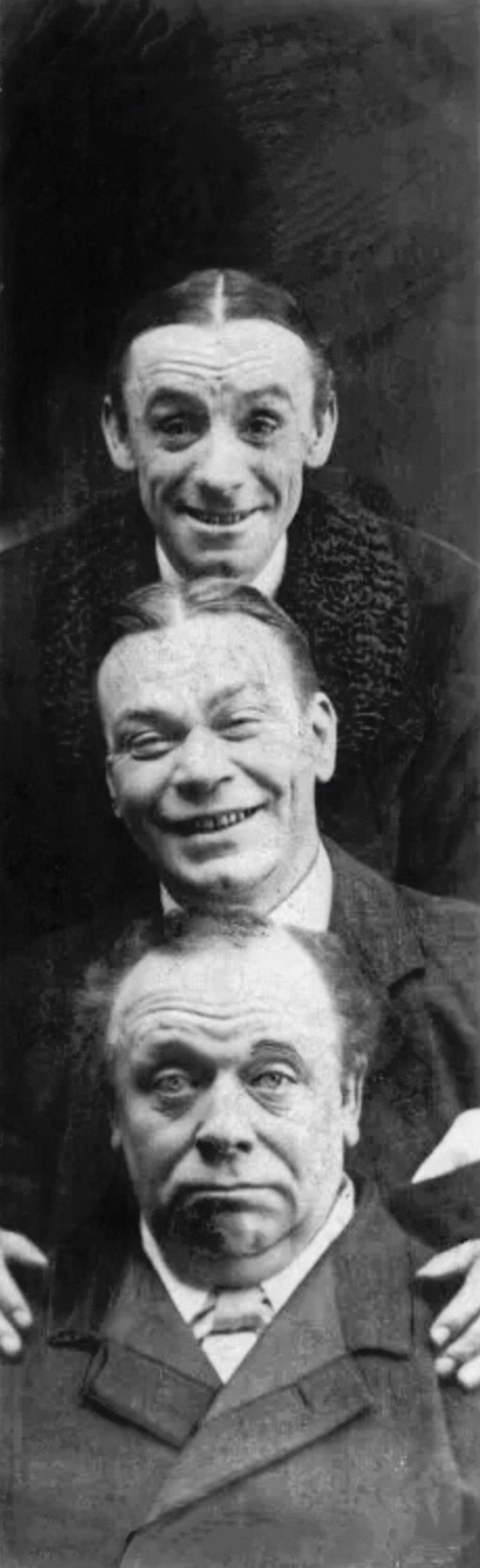
Dan Leno (top) and Johnny Danvers, c. 1900, with Drury Lane co-star Herbert Campbell (bottom)

Danvers joined Leno in the annual pantomime at the Theatre Royal, Drury Lane in December 1898 in The Forty Thieves in which Danvers played Ali Baba, while in December 1899 in Jack and the Beanstalk he appeared again with Leno and Herbert Campbell.

In 1899 Danvers appeared with Leno in the musical farce In Gay Piccadilly! by George R. Sims. In 1905 Danvers played King Ivory of Oddland in the Drury Lane pantomime The White Cat, Snap in Cinderella in 1906, a Robber in Babes in The Wood in 1907, and Alderman in Dick Whittington in 1908. During 1911 and 1912 he toured with Agnes Fraser and Walter Passmore in the musical farcical sketch Sweet Williams.

Danvers played Wurzberger in Baron Trenck (1911) at the Strand Theatre; Sarah in the pantomime Dick Whittington and His Cat at the Lyceum Theatre (1911); Laurens in Good News at the Princes Theatre (1917); and Mr. Middlemark opposite the Ebenezer Scrooge of Seymour Hicks in Scrooge at the Princes Theatre in London (1917).

== Later years ==
In 1920 Danvers played Mr. Hooley in the revival of The Shop Girl at the Gaiety Theatre; Mr Belcher in Old Bill, M.P. (1922) at the Golders Green Hippodrome; Count Hogginarmo in the pantomime The Rose and the Ring at Wyndham's Theatre (1923); and 'Old Bill' in Bruce Bairnsfather's musical comedy Carry On Sergeant! (1925) at the New Oxford Theatre in London. The show failed, running for only 35 performances and with Danvers described as "an excellent Old Bill and his cheery optimism and broad good humour kept things from flagging at several awkward moments."

== Death ==
Danvers died in Brixton on 1 April 1939, aged 78, and is buried in Streatham Park Cemetery.
