= Herbert Campbell (actor) =

English musical theatre actor

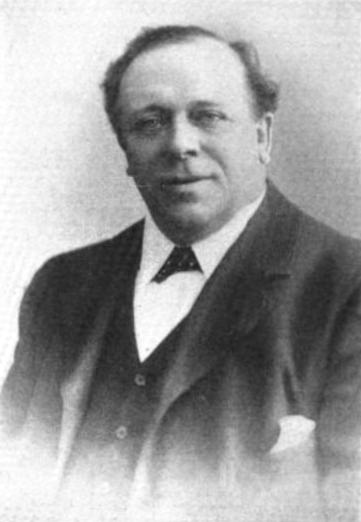
- Campbell in 1899
- Born: Herbert Edward Story; 22 December 1844; Lambeth, England
- Died: 19 July 1904 (aged 59); London, England
- Occupation: Actor
- Spouse(s): Elizabeth Ann Mills (m. 1867; died 1884) Rose Wiltshire (m. 1884; died 1891) Maud Batrum

Herbert Campbell (born Herbert Edward Story; 22 December 1844 – 19 July 1904) was an English comedian and actor who appeared in music hall, Victorian burlesques and musical comedies during the Victorian era. He was famous for starring, for many years, in the Theatre Royal, Drury Lane's annual Christmas pantomimes, predominantly as a dame.

Born in Lambeth, Campbell started his performing career appearing in amateur bands and quickly toured London's music hall's during the early 1860s. He decided to leave after a few years and adopted the stage name Herbert Campbell. He joined the minstrel performers Harman and Elston and the trio became known as Harmon, Campbell and Elston. In 1868, Campbell decided to pursue a solo career as a comic vocalist and quickly established himself as a popular music hall comedian.

In 1871 he made his first pantomime appearance in King Winter at the Theatre Royal, Liverpool and became a leading pantomime dame over the next decade. In 1882 he formed a successful association with the Theatre Royal, Drury Lane, where he appeared alongside Dan Leno in the annual Christmas pantomime, every year until his death in 1904 at age 59.

== Biography ==
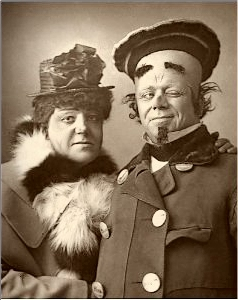
Harry Nicholls, left, with Campbell in 1888

=== Early life and career ===
Campbell was born in Lambeth to Henry George Story and his wife Hanna Fisher and was educated in west London. Campbell left school at sixteen and worked as an office boy for Murdo Young McLean, a journalist at The Sun newspaper in London. A few years later, he worked in a gun factory at Woolwich where he formed an amateur nigger band with colleagues. The idea for this was inspired by a performance of Raynor's original Christy Minstrels show which Campbell had seen during a works outing. The band soon toured music halls throughout the south east of London and raised money for charities as a result. During the early 1860s he changed his stage name to Campbell and after a less than successful performance with the band, he joined the minstrel performers Harman and Elston in their act Harmon, Campbell and Elston.

In 1867 Campbell struggled to establish a career away from his blackface act. The following year, he decided to pursue a career as a comic vocalist and made his first solo appearance at the Alhambra in Shoreditch and Collins's Music Hall in Islington. Campbell quickly established himself as a popular music hall comedian and sang many, many songs that included "Did You Ever Hear A Girl Say No?", "It's Enough To Make a Parson Swear", "They Were A Lovely Pair" and "Mother Will Be Pleased". It was his cockney style and humour displayed in these numbers which became popular with his London audiences. In 1871 he made his first pantomime appearance as King Autumn in King Winter; or, The Four Seasons at the Theatre Royal, Liverpool and was re-engaged the following year as Brazenface in Lukerland. Impressed at his performance in this piece, George Conquest hired Campbell to appear in the Christmas pantomime at the Grecian Theatre, Shoreditch, playing the same role. In 1876 he appeared as King Boobee in the next Conquest pantomime, The Grim Goblin, again at the Grecian Theatre.

=== Pantomimes at Drury Lane ===
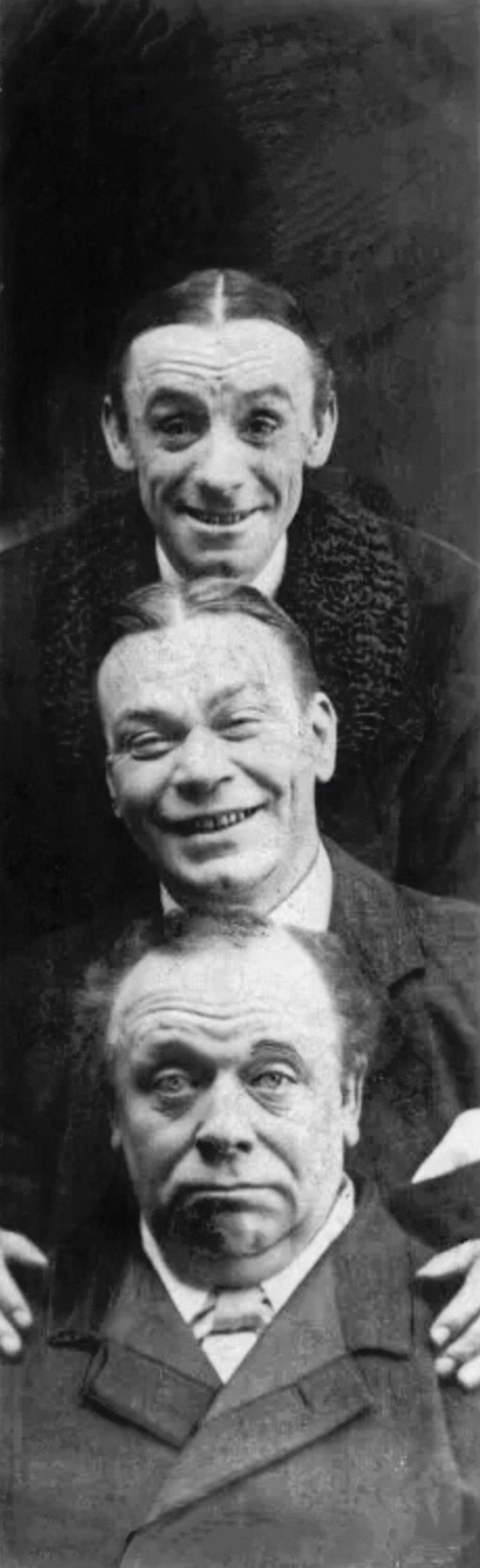
Dan Leno (top), Johnny Danvers (middle) and Herbert Campbell

In 1882, Augustus Harris, the manager of the Theatre Royal, Drury Lane, cast Campbell in a series of pantomimes which was to last until his death. From 1888 he was joined every year by Dan Leno, and their partnership became popular with audiences. As a result, his career excelled, owing much to their contrasting styles. The physical comparisons between Campbell and Leno were very different. Campbell weighed 256 pounds, was over six-foot tall and vocally, like "a powerful accordion which some miracle-worker had got into tune" alongside the diminutive and whimsical Leno. The English essayist and parodist Max Beerbohm thought of Campbell as "the offspring of some mystical union between beef and thunder" and regularly took French visitors to see him "as a liberal education in the character of this island".

In the pantomimes, Leno and Campbell would often deviate from the script, improvising freely. Some critics, including the writer E. L. Blanchard felt that the employment of music-hall performers was corrupting pantomime. However, the public felt differently, regarding the Drury Lane spectaculars as the pinnacle of Christmas entertainment. This view was also shared by critics, one of whom wrote:

I am inclined to think "the cake" for frolicsome humour is taken by the dapper newcomer, Mr. Dan Leno, who is sketched as the galvanic baroness in the wonderfully amusing dance which sets the house in a roar. The substantial 'babes', Mr. Herbert Campbell and Mr. Harry Nicholls, would have no excuse if they did not vie in drollery with the light footed Dan Leno.

Among the productions were: Babes in the Wood (1888), Jack and the Beanstalk (1889 and 1899), Beauty and the Beast (1890 and 1900), Humpty Dumpty (1891 and 1903), Little Bo-peep (1892), Robinson Crusoe (1893), Dick Whittington and His Cat (1894), Cinderella (1895), Aladdin (1896) and the Forty Thieves (1898).

=== Later career ===
During his solo career, Campbell made a successful transition from music hall performer to variety artist. Unlike many of his peers, he was embraced by audiences and performed a number of songs, including: "When You Come to Think of It" by Harry Nicholls, "A Seaside Holiday at Home", "Mama's Darling Boy", "We Don't Want to Fight", "The Great McNoodle" and "In my fust 'usband's time", Later on in life, Campbell, Leno and comedian Harry Randall decided to go into business together and formed a music hall management company. Quite often they would top their own bills.

In 1899 Campbell starred in a silent film called Herbert Campbell as Little Bobby. Released primarily as an advert for that year's Drury Lane pantomime, Jack and the Beanstalk, he played an over-indulgent man dressed in Victorian clothing, eating excessive amounts of food and drinking alcohol. The British Biograph Company produced the film which showed celebrities from the theatre and music halls in various situations. Herbert Campbell as Little Bobby was exhibited at the Palace Theatre of Varieties, London in December 1899. In 1903, Campbell received a commemorative silver plate worth £100 (£10,513 in 2025 adjusted for inflation) from the Drury Lane management in celebration of his 21 years on the stage. By 1904, and having appeared in the 1903–04 Drury Lane pantomime, Campbell considered retirement.

Campbell died on 19 July 1904 from a brain haemorrhage after he was injured by a horse having alighted from his brougham. He was buried at Abney Park Cemetery, Stoke Newington, three days later.

== Personal life ==
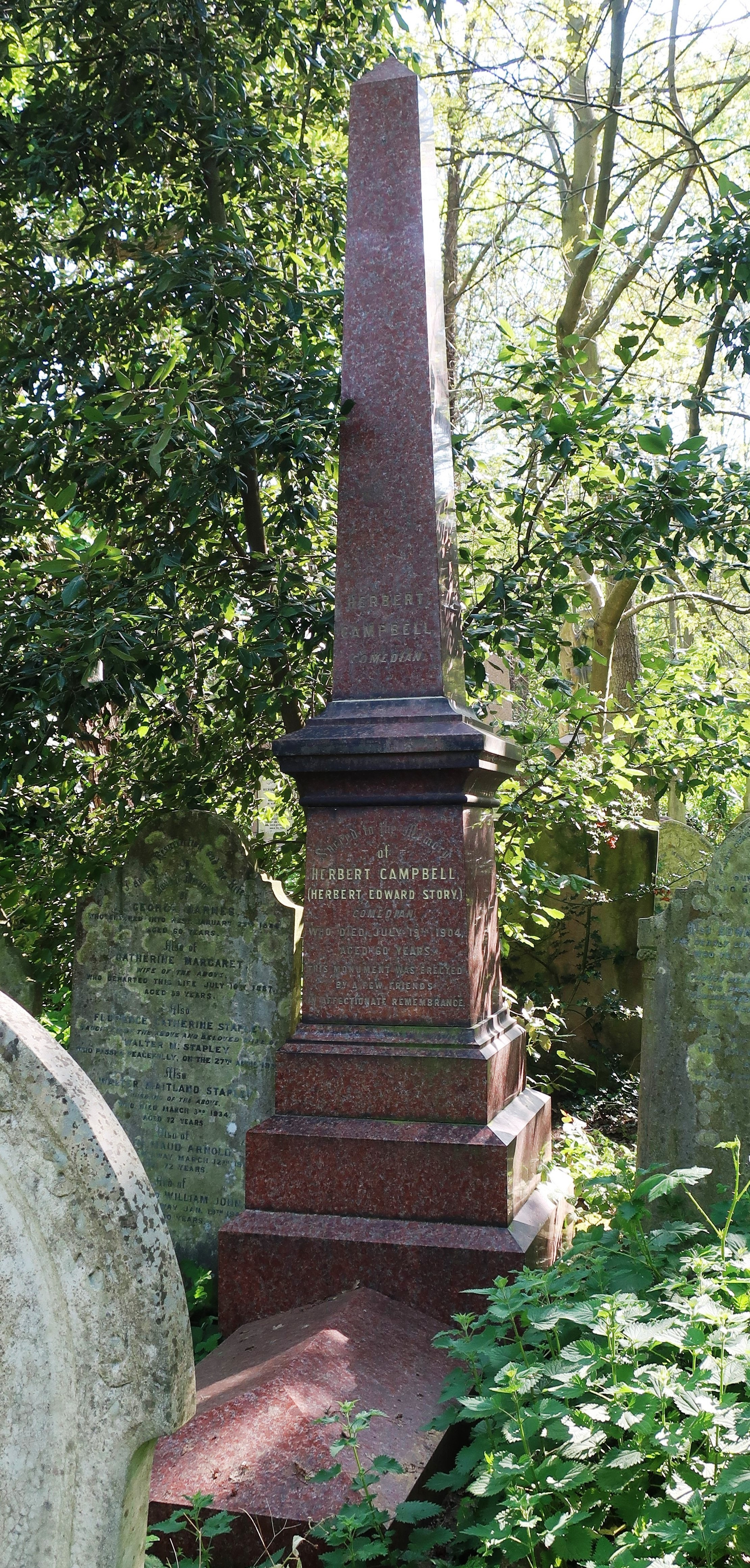
Campbell's grave in Abney Park Cemetery

On 20 April 1867 Campbell married Elizabeth Ann Mills (1849–1884) and upon her death married Rose Wiltshire (1858–1891). After her death, he married for a third time to Maud Batrum (1854–1909), to whom he remained married until his death. He was president of the Music Hall Sick Fund, vice-president of the Music Hall Artistes' Railway Association, and an active Freemason. In 1898 he, Leno, and Johnny Danvers, Leno's performer uncle, built the Granville Theatre, in Fulham. At the opening, Campbell said: "When I go off to Peckham Rye there would now be something to keep me memory green". (Note: Peckham Rye was used as cockney ryming slang for "die".)

== Notes and references ==
Notes

== Sources ==
- Anthony, Barry (2010). The King's Jester. London: I. B. Taurus & Co. ISBN 978-1-84885-430-7.
- Beerbohm, Max (1954). Around Theatres. London: Simon and Schuster. ISBN 978-0-246-63509-9.
- Brandreth, Gyles (1977). The Funniest Man on Earth: The Story of Dan Leno. London: Hamish Hamilton. ISBN 0-241-89810-2.
- Read, Jack (1985). Empires, Hippodromes and Palaces. California: Alderman Press. ISBN 978-0-946619-17-7.
