= Frank Travis =

English ventriloquist

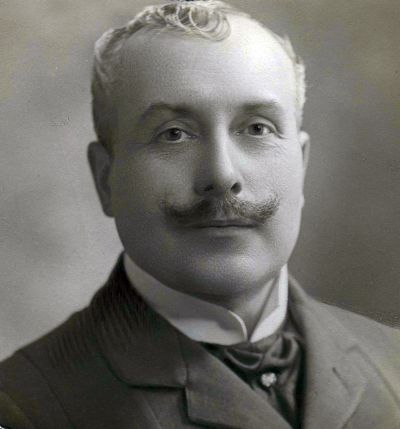
- Frank Travis c. 1900
- Born: Francis Henry Thackeray; 18 January 1854; Scarborough, North Yorkshire
- Died: 28 June 1931 (aged 77); Lambeth
- Spouses: Betsy Tate (m. 1874) Ethel Rebecca Lacey Margaret Daniels
- Children: 6, including Ernie Westo

Francis Henry Thackeray (January 18, 1854 – 28 June 1931) known professionally as Lieutenant Frank Travis was an English ventriloquist and music hall artist.

With a career spanning over forty years, he dedicated his life to furthering the art of ventriloquism, becoming world renowned and touring globally.

== Background ==
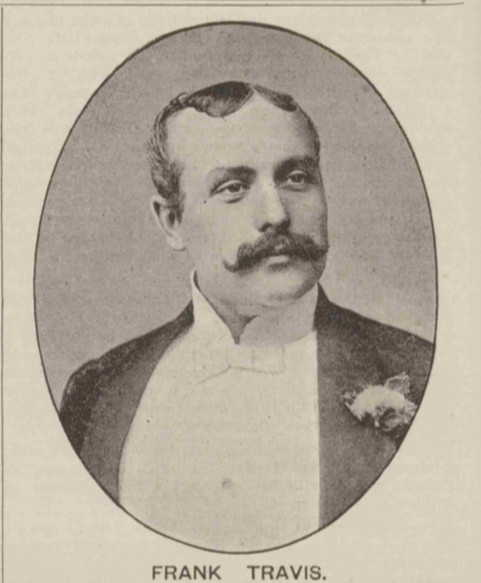
Frank Travis c.1892

Frank Travis was born 18 January 1854 in Scarborough, North Yorkshire. The eldest of four children, he began working for his father Jeremiah Thackeray as a tailor. Members of the Primitive Methodist Church, his mother Mary Thackeray (née Knaggs) was a preacher.

As a teenager he left home to join a travelling show, beginning his career barnstorming and acting in melodramas, before developing his solo ventriloquist act. Early in his barnstorming days he went solo using ‘The Talking Hand’ in which he painted his hand to resemble that of an old lady. Speaking in his memoirs he writes:

I flattered myself that I could do it to perfection for it did not matter how close a person came to me, they could not perceive the slightest movement, the deception being complete.

== Life and career ==
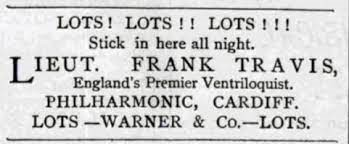

His first recorded appearance as Lieutenant Frank Travis was at Ben Lang's in Manchester. Gaining fame after a successful tour of Europe in 1879, spending thirteen months in Paris, with three months at the Folies Bergère. His act often consisted of a group of figures seated around a table, each having a distinctive and well defined voice, this was supplemented by the arrival of other figures all of whom would sing while Lieutenant Travis smoked and sipped water, giving the impression that he is but a listener himself.

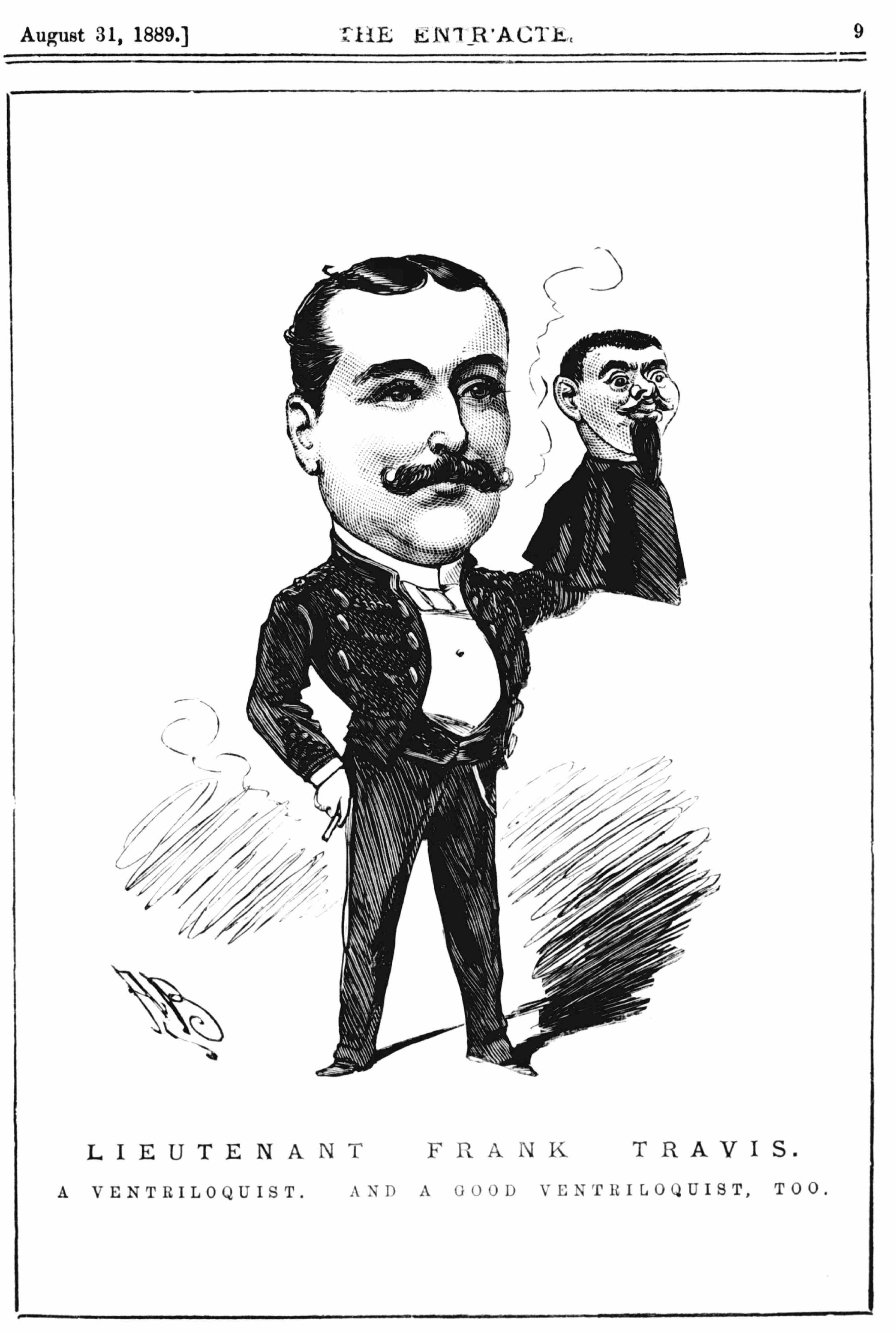
Caricature by Alfred Bryan (1889)

Travis performed widely throughout the British Isles, performing alongside music hall greats such as Marie Lloyd and Dan Leno. Performing at many of the prestigious music halls of his time including the Paragon Theatre, The Folly Theatre, Royal Cambridge Hall of Varieties, Camberwell Palace of Varieties, Glasgow Gaiety Theatre, Brighton Aquarium, and the Alhambra Theatre of Variety.

It was claimed on his behalf that he was the originator of the feats of smoking and drinking while talking in a ventriloquial scena. While ventriloquising, Travis maintained immobile lips throughout and according to the ‘Performer’ was one of the best known ventriloquists of the old school. His figures were crafted to his instructions and specifications and came to him in a basic state where he did all of the finishing touches himself.

After a break from the Music Halls he was introduced to Dick Warner a leading variety agent in England who persuaded him to resume work and he opened at the Royal Aquarium that afternoon. Warner & Co being his agent from this point on.

Upon accepting an engagement at the Theatre Royal, he met his first wife Betsy Tate (1854–1907). They married on the 31st of August 1874 in the Isle of Man.

Travis taught his wife the art of ventriloquism, making her debut at the Folies Bergère in Paris as Madeline Rosa, billing herself as the ‘world's first lady ventriloquist’. In her act she skillfully manipulated six figures and received favourable reviews.

A huge favourite in Australia touring from 1898 to 1899 in the Tivoli circuit established by Harry Rickards. He also toured the United States twice, each of 36 weeks duration.

Appearing at private drawing room entertainment for Edward VII, Princess Mathilde, Grand Duke Alexei Mikhailovich and others. Writing of this in his memoirs:

I have in my time appeared before a large number of Royal Folk, and five years ago gave my entertainment before H.R.H. the Prince of Wales (later to be King Edward) and a distinguished company, I intermingled my show on that occasion with English, French, and German sayings and songs, and it was wonderfully successful and evidently much enjoyed by the aristocratic Royal present.

He was an early member of the Grand Order of Water Rats and Variety Artistes' Federation.

== Later life ==
In 1910 Travis returned to Australia accompanied by Miss Marjorie Dean, a music hall dancer, and together they performed their act ‘The Tramp Ventriloquist’ at the Tivoli Theatre. Marjorie Dean (born Margaret Daniels) lived with Frank in their London home until his death, having two children together.

Frank Travis died on the 28 June 1931 after a long illness and was cremated at West Norwood Cemetery. Several of his children went on to become performers themselves with his daughter having a ventriloquist act and his son starring in silent films.

== Gallery ==
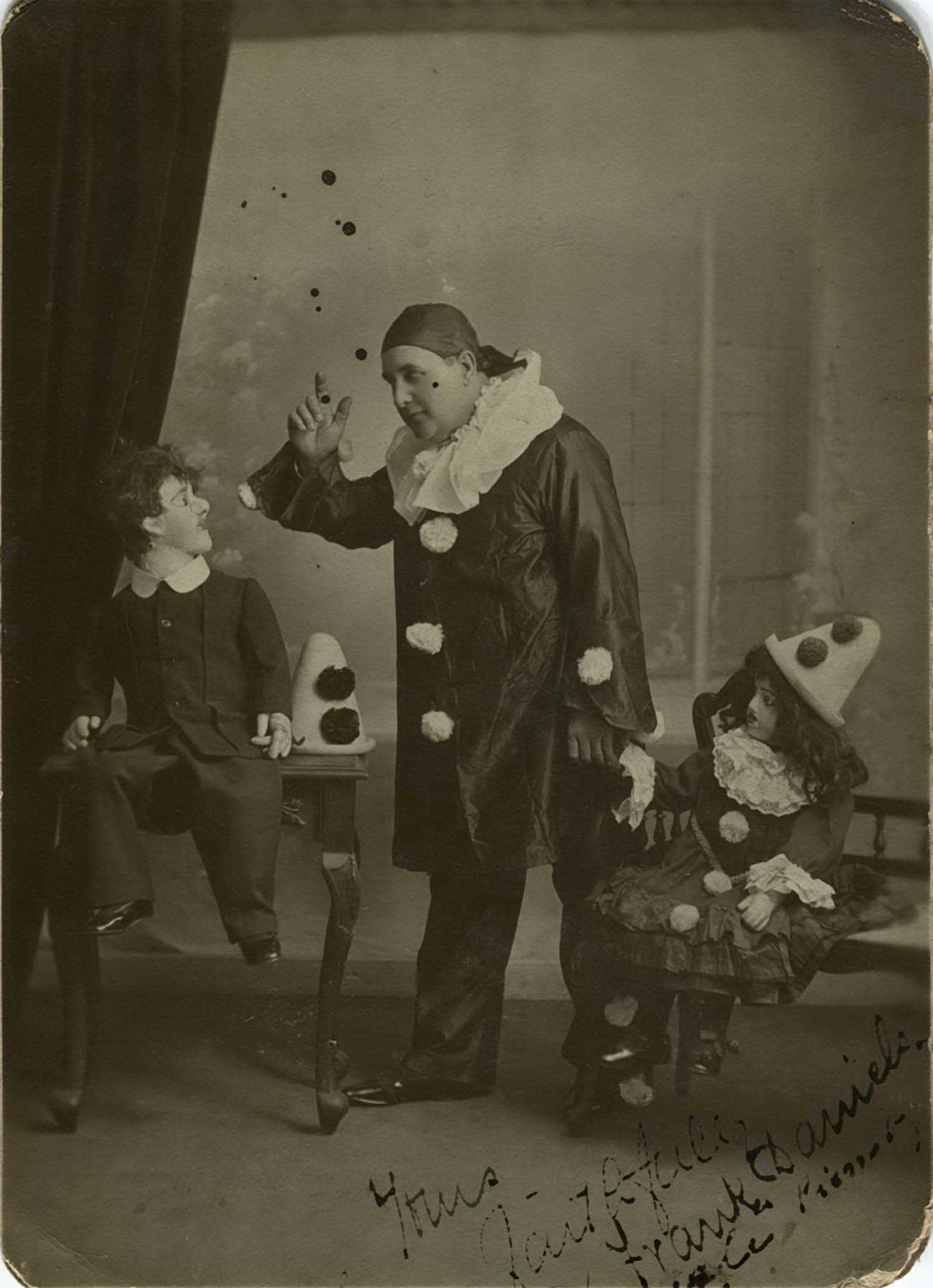
Frank Travis c.1910

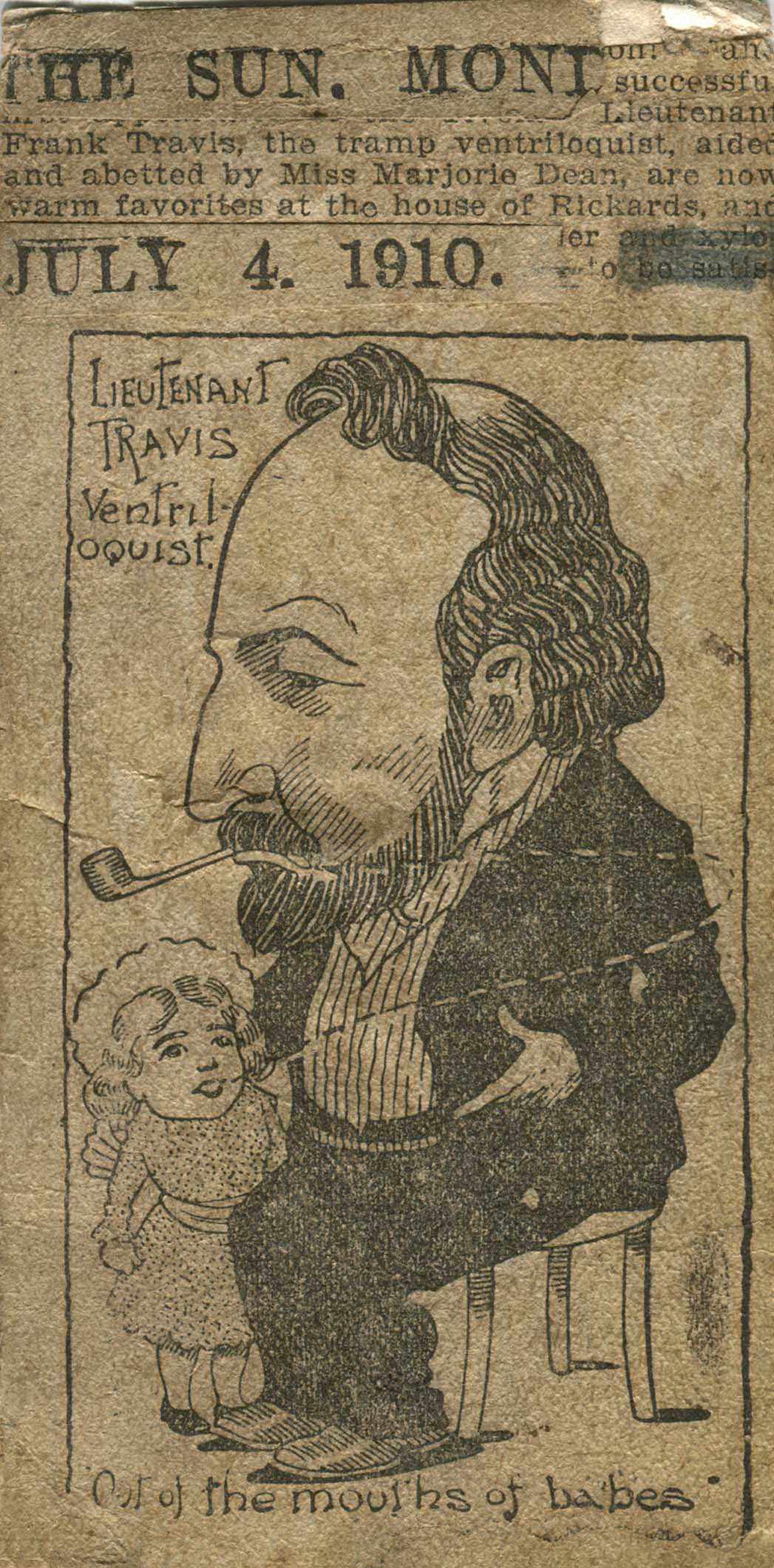
Caricature of Frank Travis c.1910

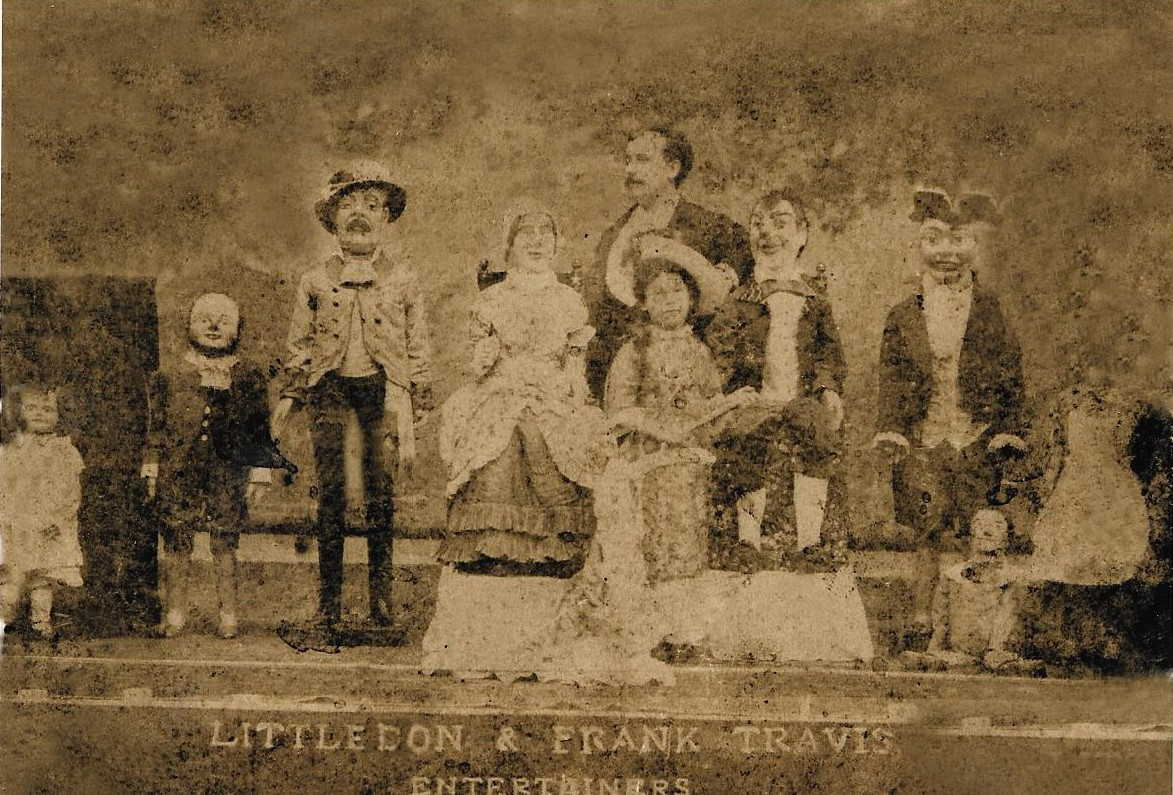
Frank Travis & Little Don c.1880

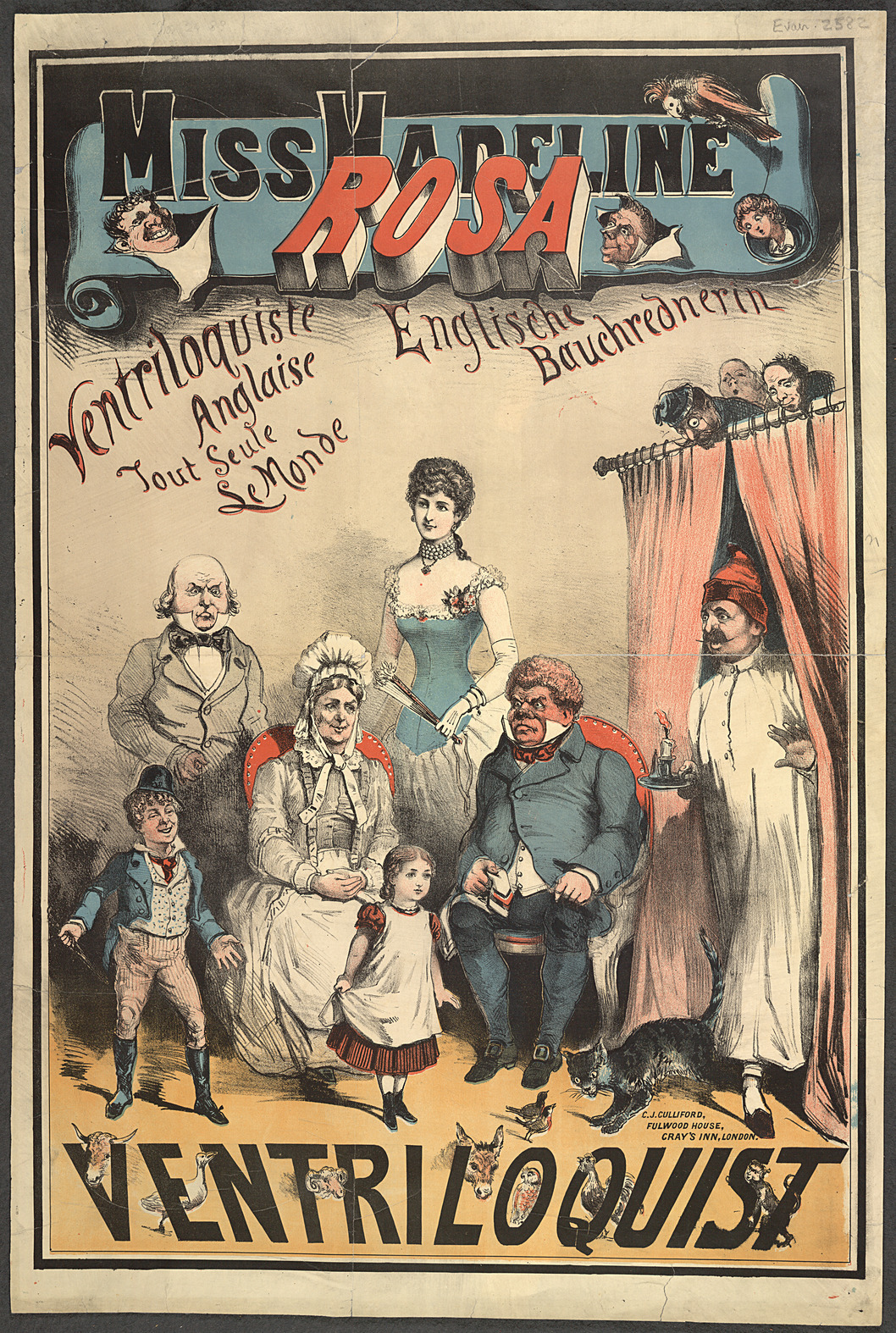
Madeline Rosa, first wife of Frank Travis c.1883
