= Augustus Glossop Harris =

British actor and theatre manager (1825–1873)

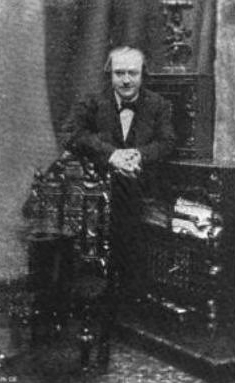
- Born: Augustus Frederick Glossop; 5 June 1825; Portici, Naples, Italy
- Died: 19 April 1873 (aged 47); London, England
- Burial place: Brompton Cemetery
- Occupations: Actor, writer, theatre manager
- Spouse: Maria Ann Bone (m. 1846)
- Children: 5, including Patience and Augustus

Augustus Frederick Glossop Harris (5 June 1825 – 19 April 1873) was a British actor, writer, and theatre manager.

Born in Portici, Naples, Italy, on 5 June 1825, he was the son of Joseph Glossop, first manager of the Royal Coburg Theatre (now known as the Victoria Theatre or the Old Vic), and opera singer Mme Féron (aka Fearon), a former prima donna assoluta at La Scala in Milan.

== Career ==
His early career saw limited success as a comedian in London, and he was imprisoned for bankruptcy in June 1848. By 1851 he had adopted the surname Harris.

Harris became a leading manager of opera and ballet, notably at Covent Garden, London, but also in Paris, Berlin and St. Petersburg. He wrote the librettos, with Edmund Falconer, for the operas The Rose of Castille (1857) and Satanella (1858), with music by Michael William Balfe, which had successful runs in London and New York. In the last four years of his life, he put on Christmas spectacles at Covent Garden.

== Personal life ==
He married Maria Ann Bone on 17 February 1846. They had five children: daughters Ellen (Nelly), Maria, and Patience, a costume designer, and sons Charles and Augustus, an actor and theatrical manager.

== Death ==
He died at his home in London on 19 April 1873, and is buried in Brompton Cemetery.

== Works ==
- The avalanche; or; The trials of the heart (1854)
- The little treasure (1855)
- Too much of a good thing! (1855)
- Doing the hansom (1856)
- My son Diana (1857)
- A very serious affair (1857)
- Gossip (with Thomas J. Williams, 1859)
- Ruthven (1859)
- Satanella, comic opera (1863)
- Tom Thrasher (1868)
- The little treasure (1880)

== See also ==
- Dick Warner (1856–1914), impresario
