= Alfred Bryan (illustrator) =

English illustrator (1852–1899)

Alfred Bryan in 1898

Alfred Bryan (1852–17 May 1899) (born as Charles Grineau) was a popular English illustrator, known for his contributions to many leading London-based weekly magazines.

He was born as Charles Grineau in Marylebone in London in 1852, the eldest of five children of Helen née Riddle (1818-1860) and William Henry Grinoneau (1829-1902), a baker. Bryan's first professional sketches were published in The Hornet (formerly The Hornsey Hornet). He also produced sketches for The London Figaro. Bryan worked for the Illustrated Sporting and Dramatic News for most of his career and was also published in periodicals such as the theatrical review Entr'acte, Moonshine (the self-styled 'Best Topical Comic Paper'), Judy magazine. Walter Sickert, a contemporary art critic, described him as "the complete, trained draughtsman", praising his illustrations as "[...]unfaltering in their mastery of line, their perfect style, their elegance and wit."

In the 1880s, Bryan lived in Connaught Road, Stroud Green moving in his final years to Endymion Road, Harringay in North London where he died in May 1899 and was buried in New Southgate Cemetery, in Barnet, North London. He left an estate valued at £2,309 9s 9d.

One of his four children was Charles William Grineau (1883–1957), an artist known for his paintings of motorcars under the pseudonyms Bryan de Grineau and John Bryan.

== Gallery ==
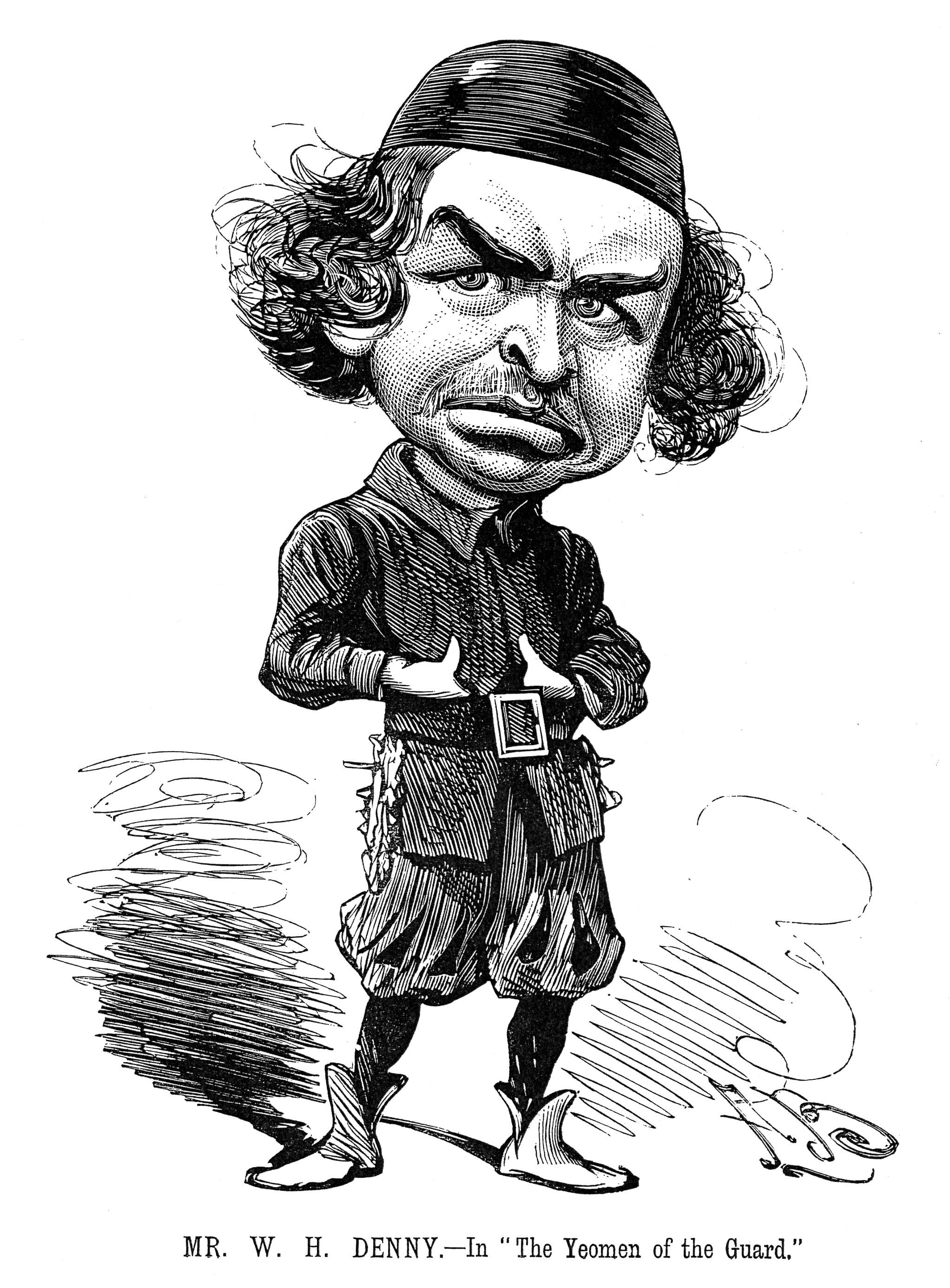
Typical Bryan caricature of the actor W. H. Denny as he appeared in The Yeomen of the Guard

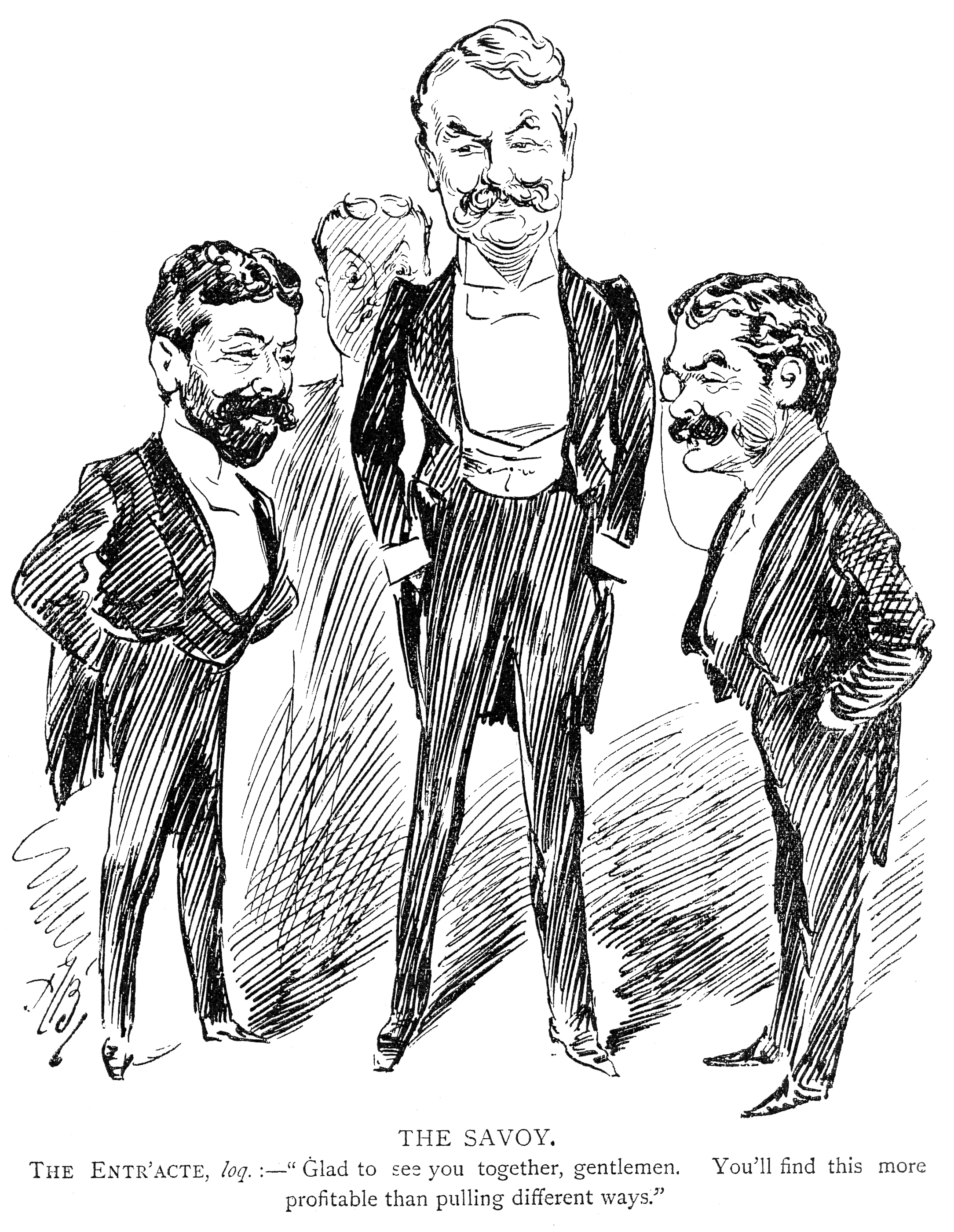
Gilbert, Sullivan and D'Oyly Carte from the 1894 Entr'acte Annual

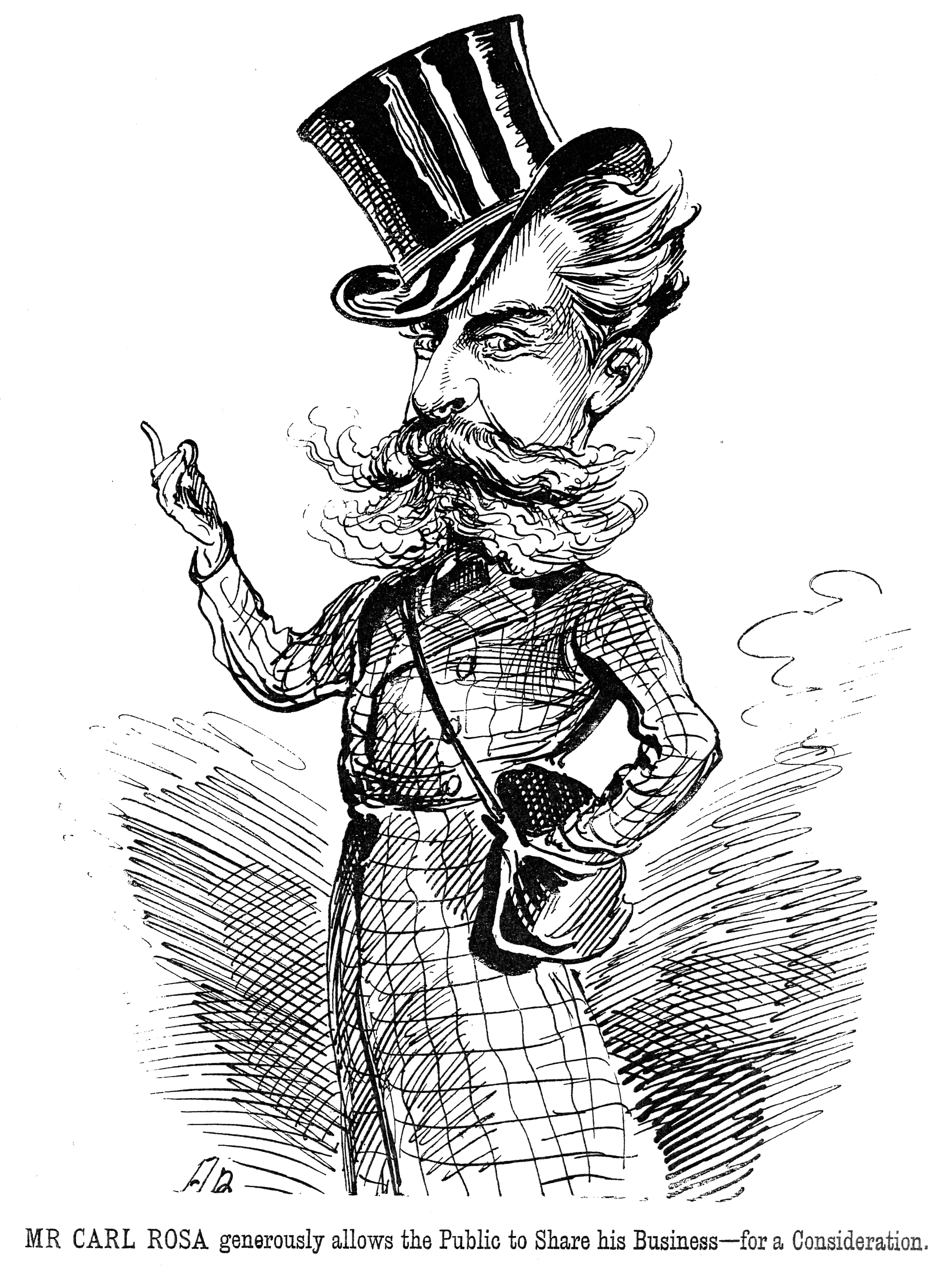
Carl Rosa from the 1888 Entr'acte Annual

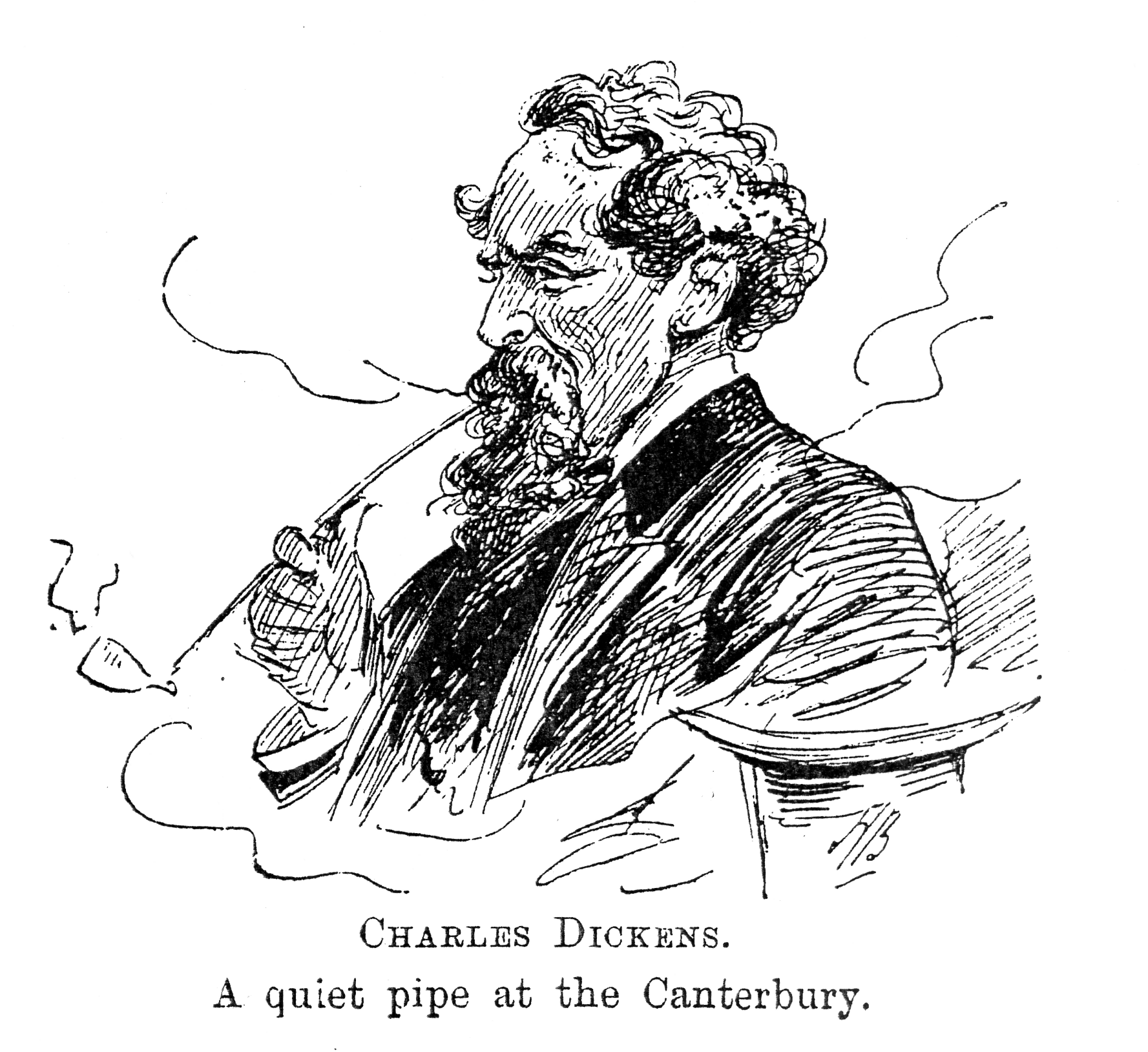
Charles Dickens from the 1893 Entr'acte Annual

Caricature of comedian Dan Leno as a Christmas pantomime dame from 1890s

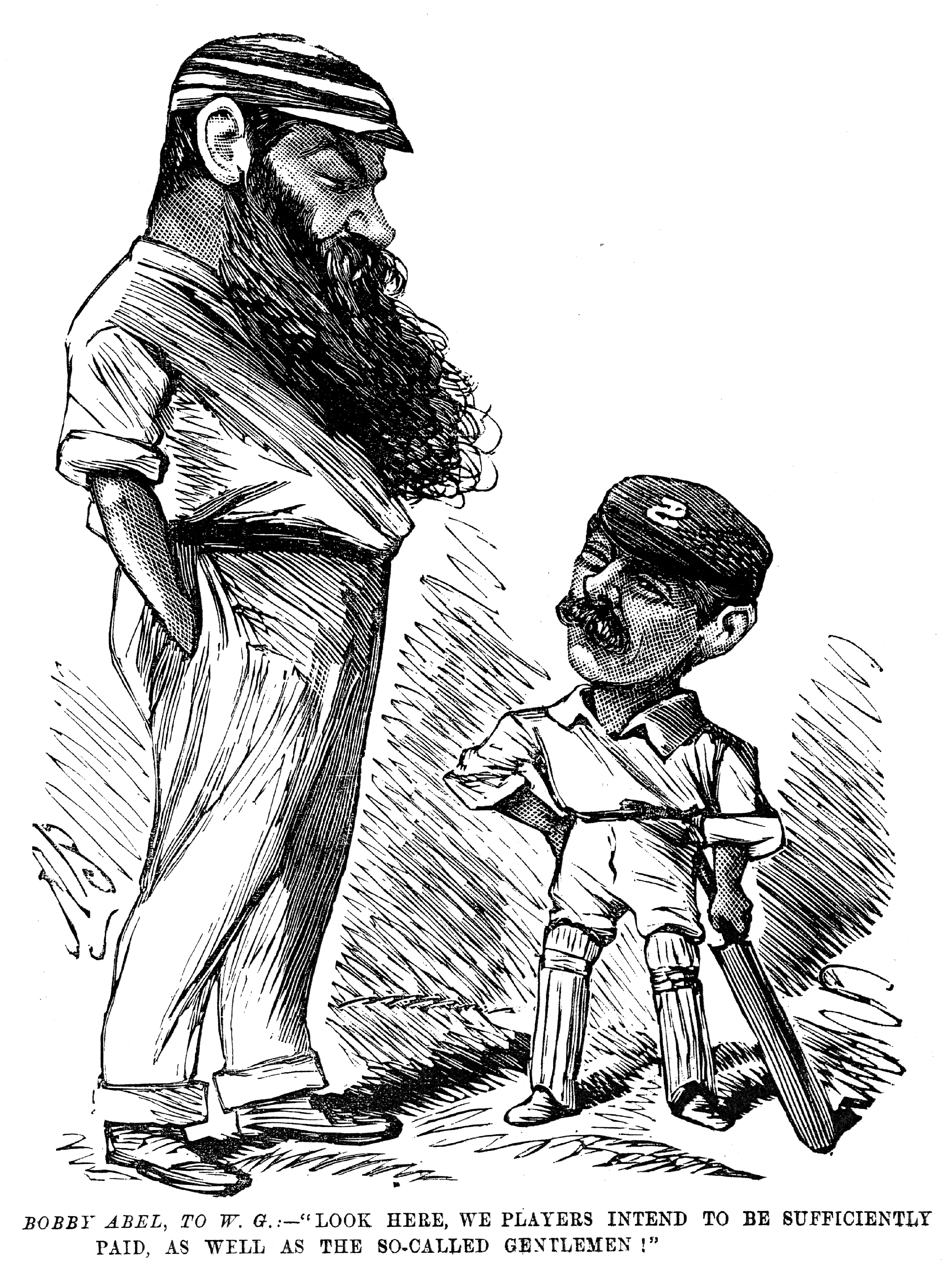
Bobby Abel, to W. G.:-"Look here, we players intend to be sufficiently paid, as well as the so-called gentlemen!", 1884 Entr'acte Annual

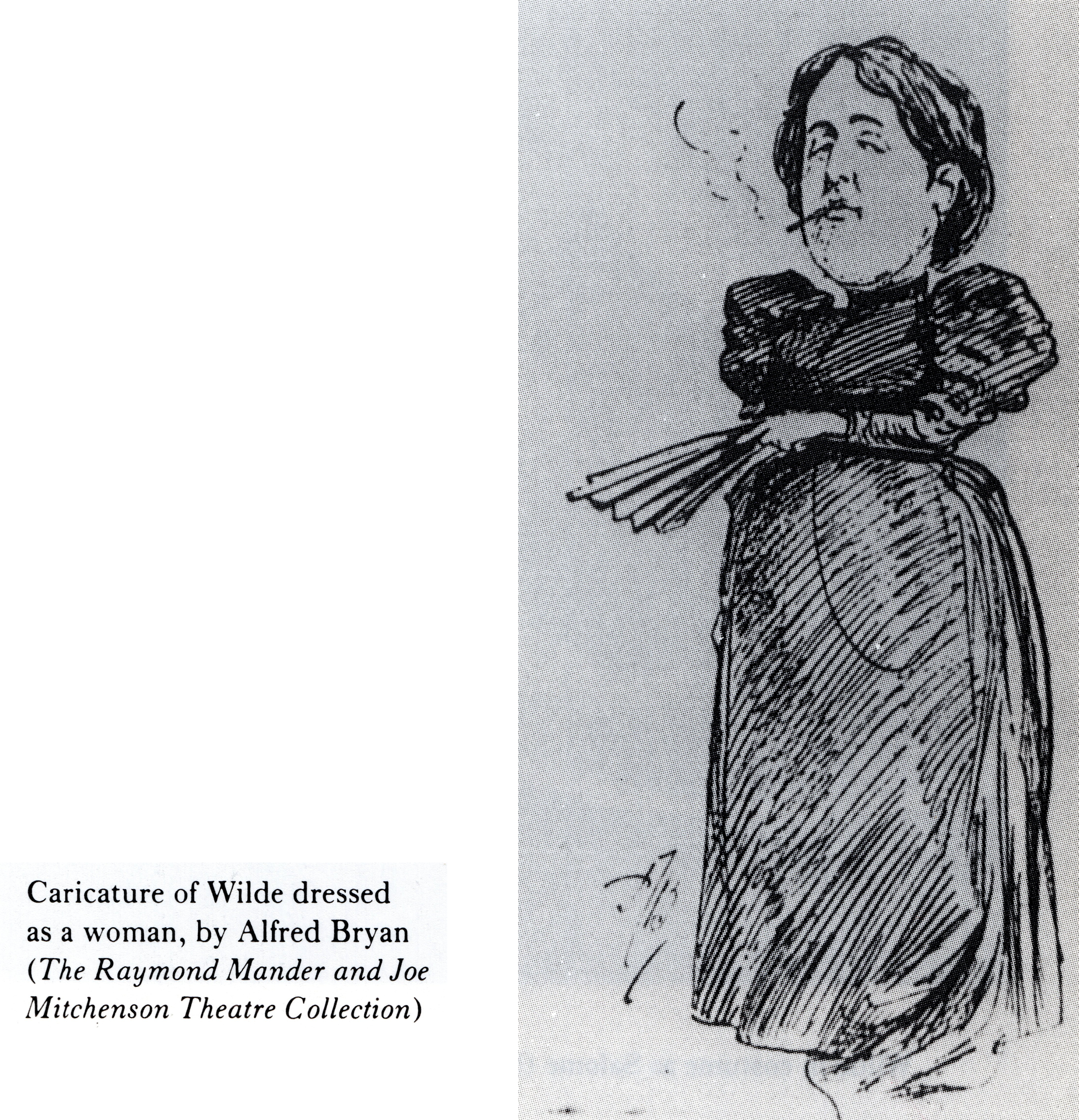
Oscar Wilde by Alfred Bryan

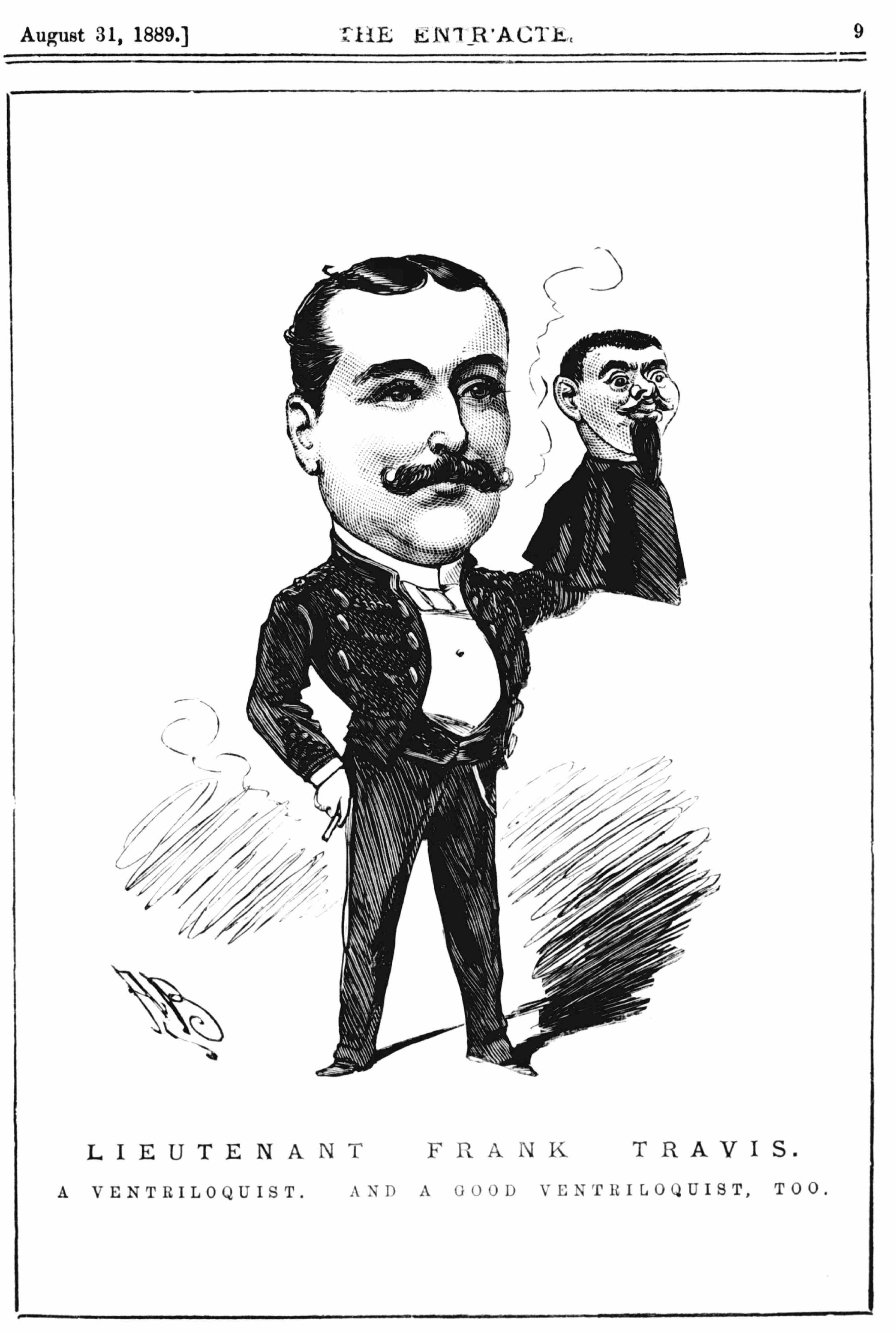
The ventriloquist Frank Travis from the 1889 Entr'acte
