= Satanella (Balfe) =

English-language opera in four acts by Michael William Balfe

- Opera by Michael William Balfe
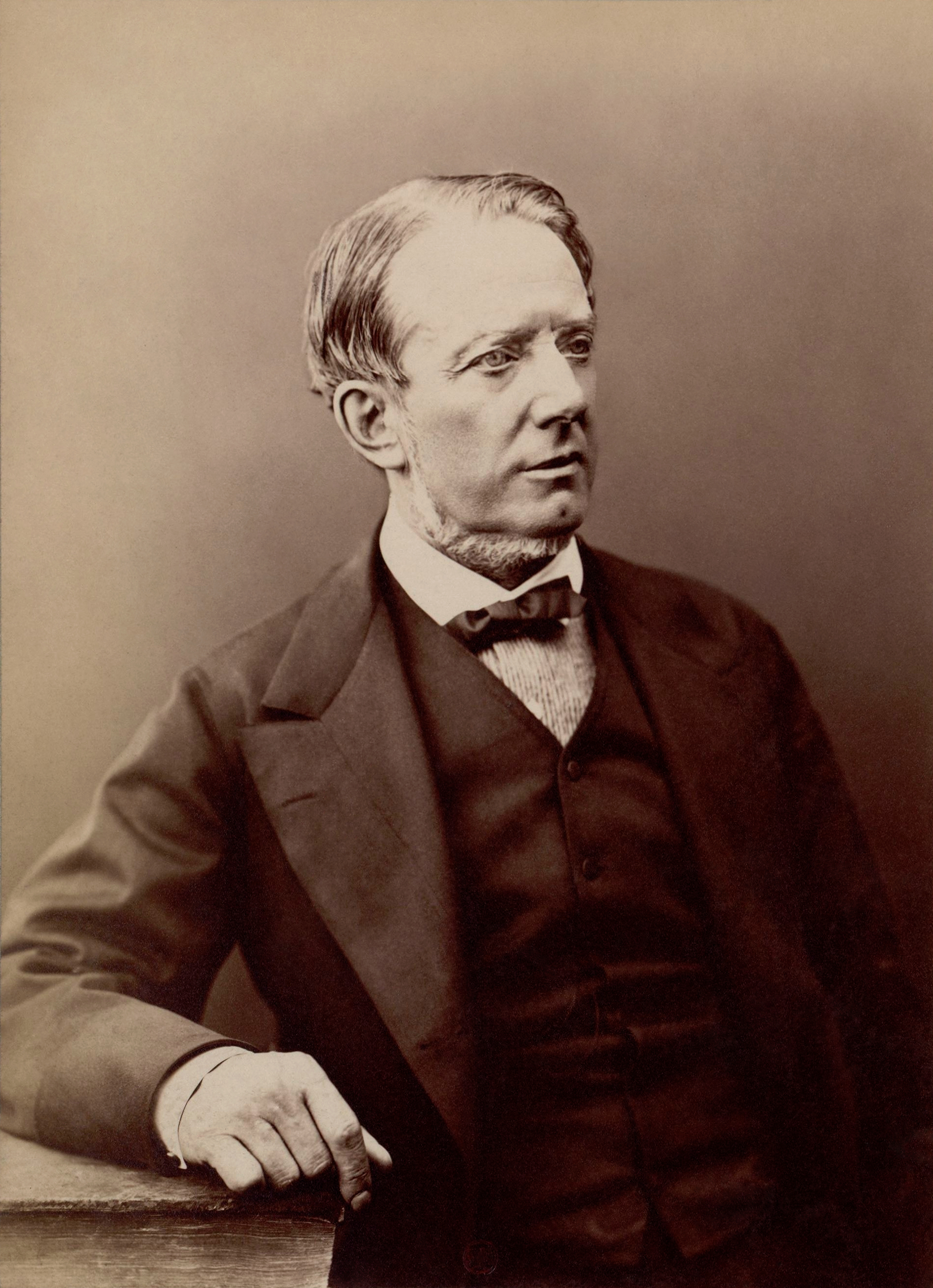
- Balfe, by Nadar
- Librettist: Augustus Glossop Harris and Edmund Falconer
- Premiere: 20 December 1858; Royal Opera House, Covent Garden

Satanella is an English-language opera in four acts by Michael William Balfe, written to a libretto by Augustus Glossop Harris and Edmund Falconer, and premiered at Royal Opera House, Covent Garden, 20 December 1858. It was the first opera to receive its world premiere at the newly-rebuilt theatre.

== Recordings ==
- Satanella – Victorian Opera Northwest: Sally Silver (soprano); Catherine Carby, Christine Tocci, Elizabeth Sikora (mezzo-sopranos); Kang Wang (tenor); Quentin Hayes, Anthony Gregory, Frank Church (baritones); Trevor Bowes (bass); Victorian Opera Orchestra and John Powell Singers, Richard Bonynge conducting NAXOS 8.660378-79
