= Felix Mendelssohn's Hawaiian Serenaders =

Hawaiian music band

Felix Mendelssohn's Hawaiian Serenaders was a popular Hawaiian music band started by British frontman Bartholdy Felix Mendelssohn (19 September 1911 – 4 February 1952). They are best known for making Hawaiian music popular in England and throughout Europe during the late 1930s and throughout the 1940s. The group were based in London.

== Felix Mendelssohn ==
Mendelssohn was born in Brondesbury Park, London, into a theatrical and entertainment family. He was the son of a stockbroker, Martin Mendelssohn (1877 – 1957) and Kate Lazarsfeld Warner (1889 – 1944) whose father was Dick Warner, the head of Warners International Theatrical Agency. Dick Warner changed the culture of popular entertainment, moving away from singing saloons and contracting more classical performers by utilising his Jewish cousinhood in Vienna, Prague and his birthplace, Bohemia. He claimed ancestry with the classical composer Felix Mendelssohn, though all Mendelssohns are of Jewish ancestry and claim cousinhood due to the endogamy of the closed Eastern European shtetels. Mendelssohn's aunt, Miriam Warner, was a West End theatrical and musical agent, as were his cousins Jack Somers and Ernest Warner in Tottenham.

== Hawaiian Serenaders ==
Mendelssohn worked for a while in his father's office in the London Stock Exchange before joining the Royal Navy at the age of seventeen. On leaving the Navy he became an actor and managed various clubs in London, including his self-named venue, Club Felix. He soon became the promotional manager for several band leaders including Mantovani, Sydney Lipton, Joe Loss, Lew Stone, and Carroll Gibbons. Despite a stammer and, by his own admission, "limited musical ability", he put together his own dance orchestra that played on Radio Luxembourg and BBC. It was in these performances that he would have them occasionally play a Hawaiian song, inspired by a visit to the South Sea Islands.

Realizing a long-standing ambition to form a Hawaiian band, in 1938 Mendelssohn took over a band led by Canadian steel guitarist Roland Peachy and renamed it "Felix Mendelssohn's Hawaiian Serenaders". While dressed in a white suit and always wearing a Polynesian garland of flowers around his neck, he merely stood by while the talent performed. In 1942, the Serenaders appeared in a variety show called The Yankee Clipper. This included a troupe of Hula Dancers from around the world, which he called his "South Sea Lovelies", for which he would make up a story about each dancer, involving audience members in the show. At its peak, the troupe numbered about fifty people.

During World War II, Mendelssohn spent some time in the Life Guards, but still managed to regularly broadcast with his Serenaders on Songs of the Islands, and later on Hawaii Calling featuring singer Rita Williams. After the war, the Serenaders appeared on radio shows like Workers Playtime, Variety Bandbox, and Music for the Housewife, as well as many variety tours. The group also appeared in two films: Demobbed (1946), starring comic Nat Jackley and the "Sweethearts in Song" Anne Ziegler and Webster Booth; and in 1951, Penny Points to Paradise, starring Harry Secombe, Peter Sellers and Spike Milligan (The Goons trio).

In 1946, the band suffered financial problems, which culminated in 1950 when Mendelssohn appeared in a bankruptcy court. He put together a tour to The Netherlands to repay his debts, but it was a financial disaster, as the expenses were more than the payment received, and this left the whole company stranded without the fare back to England. Mendelssohn negotiated with a local British Army camp, offering free shows to the servicemen in exchange for overnight accommodation and subsidised transport back home.

== Final years ==
Mendelssohn began to have health issues, but the Serenaders could perform without him. By October 1950, he had quit touring altogether, but continued with the broadcasts. Then, in December, he underwent an operation for "glandular problems" and was back on the road by May 1951. Unfortunately, his health became worse, and on 4 February 1952, after entering Charing Cross Hospital, he died from Hodgkin's lymphoma at the age of 40. He is buried at Golders Green Jewish Cemetery.

The Hawaiian Serenaders, renamed as The Esme Lee Islanders, continued for a while under the promotion of bandleader/songwriter Billy Reid.

== List of steel guitarists ==
- Roland Peachy
- Kealoha Life
- Ivor Mairants
- Wally Chapman
- Jimmy McCulloch
- Harry Brooker (father of Gary Brooker)
- Sammy Mitchell

== Discography ==
Source: Felix Mendelssohn & His Hawaiian Serenaders on Discogs

His first recording for Parlophone was in November 1939. Mendelssohn then got a two-year contract with its parent Columbia Graphophone Company in 1941.

=== Singles and EPs ===
Song titles	Publisher	Year
"In the Mood" / "I Got Rhythm"	Columbia	1940
"La Paloma" / "La Rosita"	Parlophone	1940
La Paloma / La Rosita	Decca	1940
"Tiger Rag" / "Goodbye Blues"	Parlophone	1940
"Chant of the Jungle" / "The Sheik of Araby"	Columbia	1940
"Hawaii Goes to Town" / "Rumba Rhythm"	Parlophone	1940
"Who's Taking You Home Tonight" / "You Made Me Care"	Parlophone	1940
"Aloha Oe" / "Song of the Islands"	Columbia	1941
"Dinah" / "Nobody's Sweetheart"	Columbia	1941
"Maui Waltz (Original Hawaiian Air)" / "Hawaiian Love"	Columbia	1941
"Indian Love Call" / "Speak to Me of Love"	Columbia	1941
"Lover Come Back to Me" / "La Cumparsa Cubanas"	Columbia	1941
"St. Louis Blues" / "Crazy Rhythm"	Columbia	1941
"Waltz Time in Hawaii"	Columbia	1942
"Where the Waters Are Blue" / "Sing Me a Song of the Islands"	Columbia	1942
"Hawaiian Memories (No.3)"	Columbia	1943
"Romantic Waltzes Part 1" / "Romantic Waltzes Part 2"	Columbia	1943
"Tabú" / "Little Star"	Columbia	1944
"My Little Grass Shack in Kealakekua" / "Hawaiian War Chant"	Columbia	1944
"Serenata (Toselli's Serenata)" / "Lullaby (Brahms Lullaby)"	Columbia	1945
"My Old Hawaiian Home" / "Rose of Santa Luzia"	Columbia	1945
"Goodbye Hawaii" / "My Isle of Golden Dreams"	Columbia	1945
"Caprice Viennois" / "Intermezzo"	Columbia	1945
"The Woodpecker Song" / "Indian Summer" (with George Barclay, vocals)	Columbia	1946
"Mamula Moon" / "Hawaii Sang Me to Sleep"	Columbia	1948
"Now is the Hour" / "Samoan Farewell Song"	Columbia	1948
"Romantic Waltzes–No.6"	Columbia	1949
"E-Liliu-E, Hula (Beautiful Queen)" / "South Sea Sadie (The Little South Sea Lady)"	Columbia	1949
"By the Sleepy Lagoon" / "Whisper That You Love Me"	Columbia	1949
"La Golondrina" / "La Vie en rose"	Columbia	1950
"Moonlight in Waikiki" / "Tiger Shark"	Columbia	1956

These singles were compiled into a dozen or so albums, and many of those were reissued on CD.
