= Edmund Falconer =

Irish poet, actor, theatre manager, songwriter and playwright

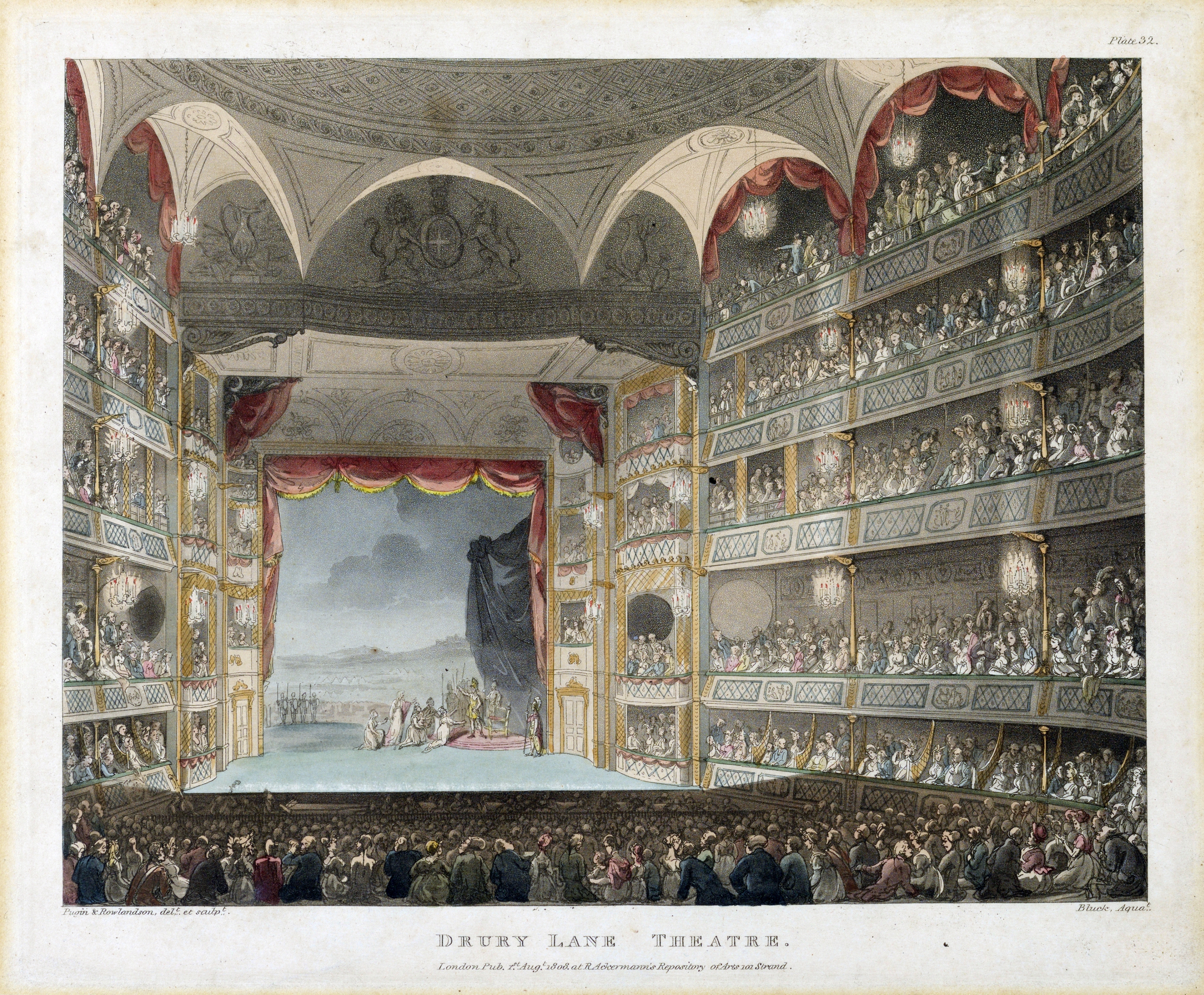
- Old Theatre Royal, Drury Lane
- Born: Edmund O'Rourke; 1814; Dublin, Ireland
- Died: 1879 (aged 64–65); Russell Square, London
- Occupations: Actor, poet, theatre manager, songwriter, playwright
- Years active: 1824–1879
- Spouse: Married three times

Edmund Falconer (c.1814 – 29 September 1879), born Edmund O'Rourke, was an Irish poet, actor, theatre manager, songwriter and playwright, known for his keen wit and outstanding acting skills.

== Early life ==
Edmund O'Rourke was born in Dublin around 1814. He entered the theatrical world as a child, however he did not achieve fame until he was over 40. The first half of his working life was spent playing in repertory theatre in Ireland and the provinces of England. While working as a jobbing actor, he published his first volume of poems – Man's Mission – in 1852.

== Midlife success ==
O'Rourke finally achieved success at the age of 41, when he performed two very diverse roles in Hamlet and the comedy Three Fingered Jack on the same night at the Adelphi Theatre in Liverpool in 1854. He received such rave reviews that he never had to tour the provinces again.

Two years later he changed his stage name to Edmund Falconer and wrote his first successful play, The Cagot or Heart for Heart. It was the start of his second career, that of a London dramatist. Heart for Heart was performed with great success for the first time at the Lyceum Theatre, London, under Charles Dillon's management, on 6 December 1856. The Athenaeum newspaper commented that 'the dialogue is remarkable for noble sentiment, although the verse is not always correct' (13 Dec 1856). His next piece was A Husband for an Hour, produced at the Haymarket Theatre in June 1857.

== Writing and theatre management ==
The year 1858 saw Falconer translate Victor Hugo's Ruy Blas, which was performed at the Princess Theatre in late 1858. During that same year, he began a profitable collaboration with the composer Michael William Balfe by writing (in collaboration with Augustus Glossop Harris) the librettos for the operas The Rose of Castille (1857) and Satanella (1858), as well as the lyrics for Balfe's popular song Killarney, which remained a concert hall favourite well into the 20th century.

Falconer, who was said to have had boundless energy, also turned his attention to theatre managing. It was on 26 August 1858 with F. B. Chatterton that he took over the Lyceum Theatre in London. Falconer was not above using his position to stage his own plays. The first was Extremes, a comedy of manners, which was performed on his opening night of 26 August.

A reporter for The Times reviewed the show and said: "The characters are sharply defined and exactly of a kind to be perfectly intelligible to a large audience." Several more of Falconer's own pieces soon followed, including Francesca in March 1859.

Falconer gave up his management of the Lyceum after just a couple of years, although he resumed the role once more in 1861. Yet more of his own plays soon followed, including Woman, Love Against The World in August 1861 and Peep o' Day in November 1861. It is for Peep o' Day, a stage-version of John Banim’s novels John Doe and The Nowlans, that Falconer is probably best remembered. It contained a scene in which the heroine is saved from live burial and ran until December 1862. Meanwhile, he contributed two comedies to the Haymarket Theatre, too, Family Wills and Does He Love Me?, both starring Amy Sedgwick.

== Acting success ==
It was not until 1860 that Falconer managed to dominate the London stage with his acting skills, rather than his writing. In the first production of Boucicault's The Colleen Bawn he played the part of Danny Mann, the villain of the piece. The melodrama, staged at the Adelphi Theatre in July 1860, proved hugely popular and ran for 231 nights. Indeed, the show has recently enjoyed revived critical attention.

Falconer made £13,000 in profit during his time as manager at the Lyceum, which he used in 1862 to buy a joint lease for the Theatre Royal, Drury Lane, London, with Frederick Balsir Chatterton. Between 1863 and 1865 he wrote and produced Bonnie Dundee, Nature's above Art, Night and Morning, and Love's Ordeal. He also wrote The O'Flahertys and Galway-go-bragh, a dramatization of Lever's Charles O'Malley, in which he took the part of Mickey Free.

Falconer's attempts, however, to popularise Shakespeare at the theatre proved a dreadful failure. Gambling on the Bard to turn a profit, he directed productions of Macbeth, As You Like It, Henry IV and Romeo and Juliet. Despite hiring good actors, audiences were small and, by February 1866, he had lost his money. Falconer was arrested for failing to pay his mounting debts later that month and, on 26 April 1866, he was declared bankrupt and sent to prison. He remained in custody for several weeks, with his debts thought to total around 7,000 guineas.

Falconer attempted to revive his fortunes by penning a five-act drama, Oonagh, or, The Lovers Of Lismona, following his release, which was staged at the Theatre Royal, Haymarket, London, on 19 November 1866. The night of the premiere became known as one of the most notorious disasters of the Victorian stage. Beginning at 7:30 p.m., it was still going at 11. At midnight, most of the audience left while the play continued; by 2 a.m., only a few critics and some spectators remained with the play not yet finished, but shortly before 3 a.m. on 20 November the stagehands took it upon themselves to lower the curtain with the action still in progress. Somehow, with massive cutting, it managed to run until 30 November, but was still a catastrophic failure. By now desperately short of money, he decided to travel to America, where his play Peep o' Day had made him famous.

== Final years ==
Falconer spent three successful years in America, where he acted on Broadway and continued with his writing, creating three new dramas. One of his greatest fans was Mark Twain, author of Tom Sawyer, as can be witnessed in letters written by Twain. Such was his US success, that publications of his plays went through several editions. He also married an American woman, who was his third wife.

Falconer eventually returned to London in 1871, following the success of another of his plays, A Wife Well Won, which was staged at the Haymarket Theatre, London, in his absence. A successful production of Eileen Oge at the Princess Theatre, London, followed later in 1871, which featured his song Killarney. Falconer retired from the stage and writing soon after. He died at his home at 28 Keppel Street, Russell Square, London, on 29 September 1879 and was buried at Kensal Green Cemetery.

In a report on his death, the Manchester Guardian newspaper revealed that although Falconer "had made what could be called a colossal fortune" out of Peep O' Day, the dramatist "died penniless." Members of his gentlemen's club, the Savage Club, opened a subscription to pay for his funeral and help out his young widow.

== Falconer's works ==
- 1852: Man’s Mission: A Pilgrimage to Glory’s Goal (poem)
- 1855-1860: The Power of Love (ballad) Words-Falconer/music by M.W. Balfe.
- 1856: The Cagot or Heart for Heart (play)
- 1857: The Rose of Castille (libretto)
- 1857: Killarney (song) Later recorded by John McCormack in early 20th century.
- 1862: Peep o'Day - otherwise known as Savoureen Deelish (play)
- 1863: The Bequest of My Boyhood (poem)
- 1865: O’Ruark’s Bride: The Blood Speck in the Emerald (poem)
- 1866: Dramatised Lever's Charles O’Malley as Galway Go Bragh (play)
- 1871: Eileen Oge - or Dark the Hour Before Dawn (melodrama)
- 1880: The Deserted Village, opera in three acts to music by John William Glover (London: Duncan Davison, 1880).

The International Broadway Database gives the following information for Falconer's performances in America:

- Heartsease: Original play written by Edmund Falconer - 12 Sep 1870
- Innisfallen: Original play written by Edmund Falconer- 21 Feb 1870
- The Firefly: Original play written by Edmund Falconer - 22 Nov 1869 (Mark Twain was a huge fan)
- Charles O'Malley: Original play written and performed by Falconer - 18 Oct 1869
- Fire Fly: Original musical written by Edmund Falconer - 10 Aug 1868 – 5 Sep 1868
- The Rose of Castille: Revival of libretto by Falconer - 28 Jan 1867 – 31 Jan 1867
- Satanella: Original musical libretto by Edmund Falconer - 23 Feb 1863 - 14 Mar 1863

== James Joyce links ==
The opera The Rose of Castille, for which Falconer wrote the libretto, was very popular for several decades after his death. Indeed, it was a favourite of Leopold Bloom, the hero of James Joyce's Ulysses (1922) In the novel, Bloom thinks quite a lot about the opera, and it features as one of the motifs of the Sirens episode (Chapter 11). Joyce even thinks up a dreadful pun on the title; one of the characters asks which opera has the same name as a train's tracks, and the answer is 'Rows of Cast Steel'. The pun crops up at various points throughout the novel.

== Bibliography ==
- Irish Literature Companion. The Concise Oxford Companion to Irish Literature. Copyright © 1996, 2000, 2003 by Oxford University Press.
