= Patience Harris =

British costume designer (1857–1901)

Patience Glossop Harris (1857 – December 1901), was a British costume designer for the theatre best known for her work with the actor Ellen Terry early in her career.

== Biography ==
Patience Glossop Harris was the daughter of Augustus Glossop Harris, an actor and theatre manager, and Maria Ann (née Bone) Harris, a theatrical costumier. She had two sisters, Ellen (Nelly) and Maria, and two brothers, Charles and Augustus, an actor and theatrical manager.

Harris oversaw the actress Ellen Terry's costumes during the first decade of Terry's career at the Lyceum Theatre, from the late 1870s to the late 1880s During this period Harris designed elaborate, heavy costumes in luxurious fabrics for Romeo and Juliet, The Merchant of Venice, and Much Ado About Nothing, among other plays. In 1882 Terry brought the costume designer Alice Comyns Carr on board as a consultant. Harris and Carr worked together until 1887, but their tastes differed, with Carr favouring simpler, more flowing designs in the Aesthetic dress style. Their disagreements reached a head in 1887 over designs for the plays Henry VIII and The Amber Heart, and Harris resigned. Carr succeeded her as Terry's head costume designer.

Harris's mother operated her costume business under the name "Madame Auguste" and supplied costumes to, among others, the D'Oyly Carte Opera Company in the 1880s. Under the same name, Harris supplied costumes to D'Oyly Carte for seven productions from 1892 to 2001.

At the time of her death she was working under the company name Auguste et Cie. Costumes bearing this label were worn by both Terry and the actor–manager Henry Irving.

The circumstances of Harris's death provoked an inquest, and it was suggested that she may have died of alcoholism.
