= The Glasgow Gaiety Theatre =

Former theatre in Glasgow, Scotland

Coordinates: 55.858°N 4.2568°W

The Gaiety Theatre
- Tivoli Variety Theatre
- Interactive map of The Gaiety Theatre
- Address: Argyle StAnderston Cross; Glasgow; United Kingdom

Construction
- Opened: 1899
- Closed: 1965
- Rebuilt: 1904
- Years active: 66

The Glasgow Gaiety Theatre was a cine-theatre in Anderston Cross, Glasgow, Scotland. Originally known as the Victoria Music Hall, then the Tivoli Variety Theatre, and co-founded by a grandson of James Baylis of the Theatre Royal, Glasgow it opened in 1899 presenting Musicals, variety shows and pantomimes. When it was rebuilt in 1904 it changed to operate as a cine-variety under the name of Gaiety Theatre, becoming a full cinema in 1935. The Beatles appeared there in 1963. The cinema closed in 1965. It is not to be confused with the Gaiety Theatre, Sauchiehall Street, which became the Empire Theatre.
