= Portrait of Madeleine Bernard =

Painting by Paul Gauguin

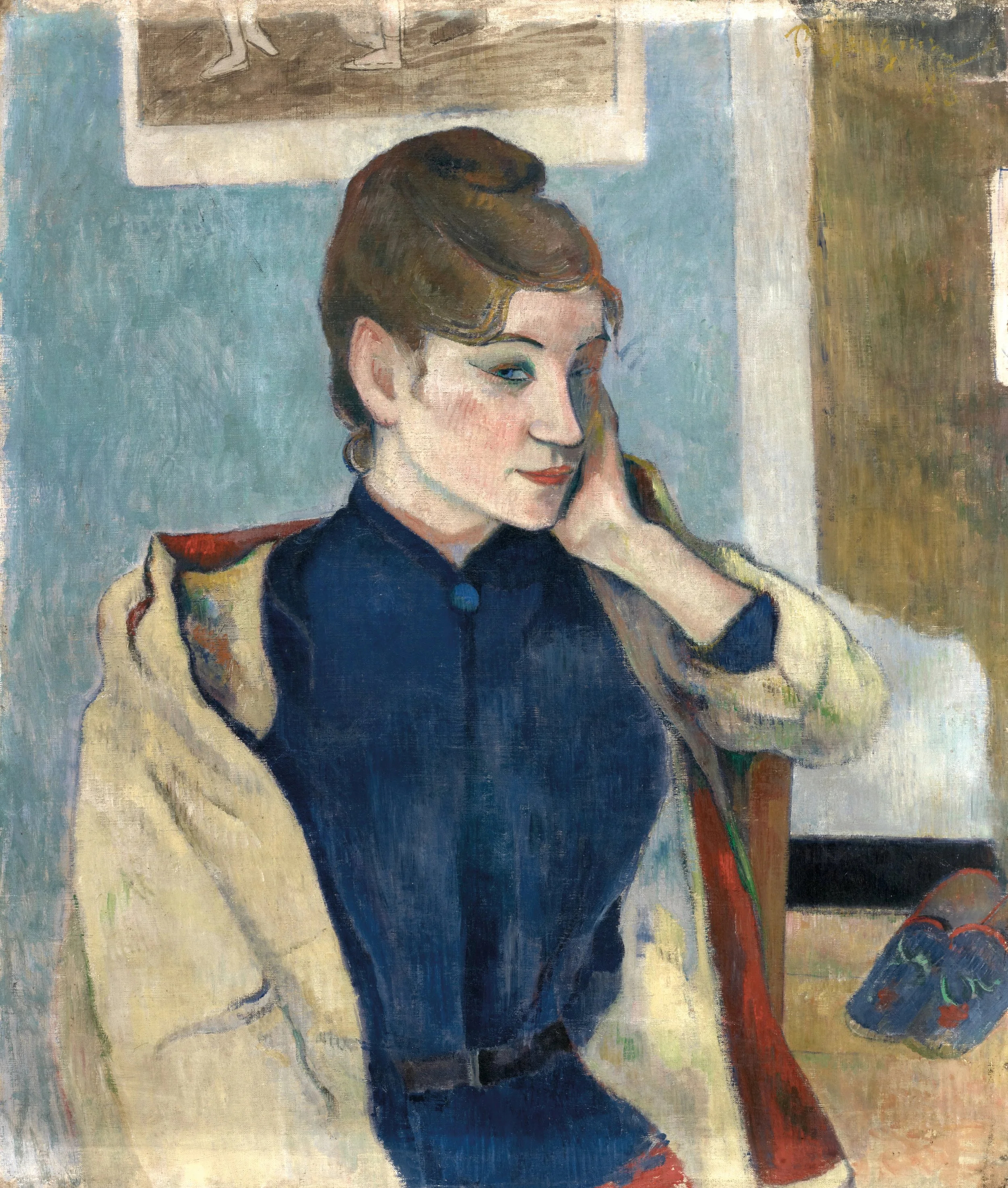
- Artist: Paul Gauguin
- Year: 1888
- Medium: oil on canvas
- Dimensions: 72 cm × 58 cm (28 in × 23 in)
- Location: Museum of Grenoble, Grenoble

Portrait of Madeleine Bernard is an August 1888 oil on canvas painting by Paul Gauguin, now in the Museum of Grenoble, which bought it for 20,000 francs in 1923. Painted during his stay in Pont-Aven, the work depicts the 17 year old Madeleine Bernard, sister of the painter Émile Bernard, whom Gauguin had fallen in love with. Gauguin used both sides of the canvas—either due to lack of funds or because he could not find canvases in Pont-Aven at that time—and his June 1888 The White River is on the reverse.

The joint work was initially acquired by a collector from Montpellier, Maurice Fabre, who then sold it to Eugène Druet. It then passed to Alexandre Bernheim and was bought by its present owner in 1923 for 20,000 francs or - as that museum's curator Andry-Farcy put it - "10,000 francs per Gauguin!". It was stolen in June 1978 whilst being brought back from an exhibition in Marseille, but was recovered in a poor state of conservation the following year. It has now been re-framed and restored.

== See also ==
- List of paintings by Paul Gauguin
