= Prisoners' Round (after Gustave Doré) =

1890 painting by Vincent van Gogh

- The Prison Courtyard
- Artist: Vincent van Gogh
- Year: February 1890
- Catalogue: F669; JH1885
- Medium: Oil on canvas
- Dimensions: 80 cm × 64 cm (31 in × 25 in)
- Location: Pushkin Museum, Moscow

Prisoners' Round (after Gustave Doré), also known as The Prisoners' Round, or Prisoners Exercising, or The Prison Courtyard, (F669) is an oil painting of February 1890 by Vincent van Gogh.

This late work was painted at Saint-Paul Asylum in Saint-Rémy, inspired by an 1872 engraving by Gustave Doré of the exercise yard (le bagne) at Newgate Prison published in the book London: A Pilgrimage.

The original oil painting is held by the Pushkin Museum in Moscow.

== Background ==
Van Gogh suffered an attack of ill mental health in 1888, and he was detained in a mental hospital from May 1889 to May 1890. The director of the hospital, Dr. Peillon, and Van Gogh's brother, Theo, encouraged Vincent to paint in order to aid his recovery.

Unable to go out to paint from life, he turned to copying other works, including photographs and engravings.

== Creation and interpretation ==
Although the original was created by Gustave Doré, Van Gogh worked on The Prisoners' Round from a more distinct woodblock reproduction by Héliodore Pisan, from a Dutch magazine, De Katholieke Illustratie (6 (1872–1873), no. 45, p. 357).

The painting depicts a group of prisoners walking in a circle around a claustrophobic prison yard, surrounded by brick walls with a few small arched windows high up. The prisoners are parading past detectives so they would remember the criminal's faces. The work is dominated by depressing tones of blue and green in the shadowy depths of the yard, with splashes of red on the better lit bricks above, and two small white butterflies higher up. One prisoner at the front of the group, without a cap, whose features may resemble Vincent's, has turned his head to look out at the viewer. The scene recalls Van Gogh's own detention, and his psychological isolation.

Van Gogh wrote to his brother Theo that he found it difficult to execute this work and his painting of Men Drinking (after Honoré Daumier).

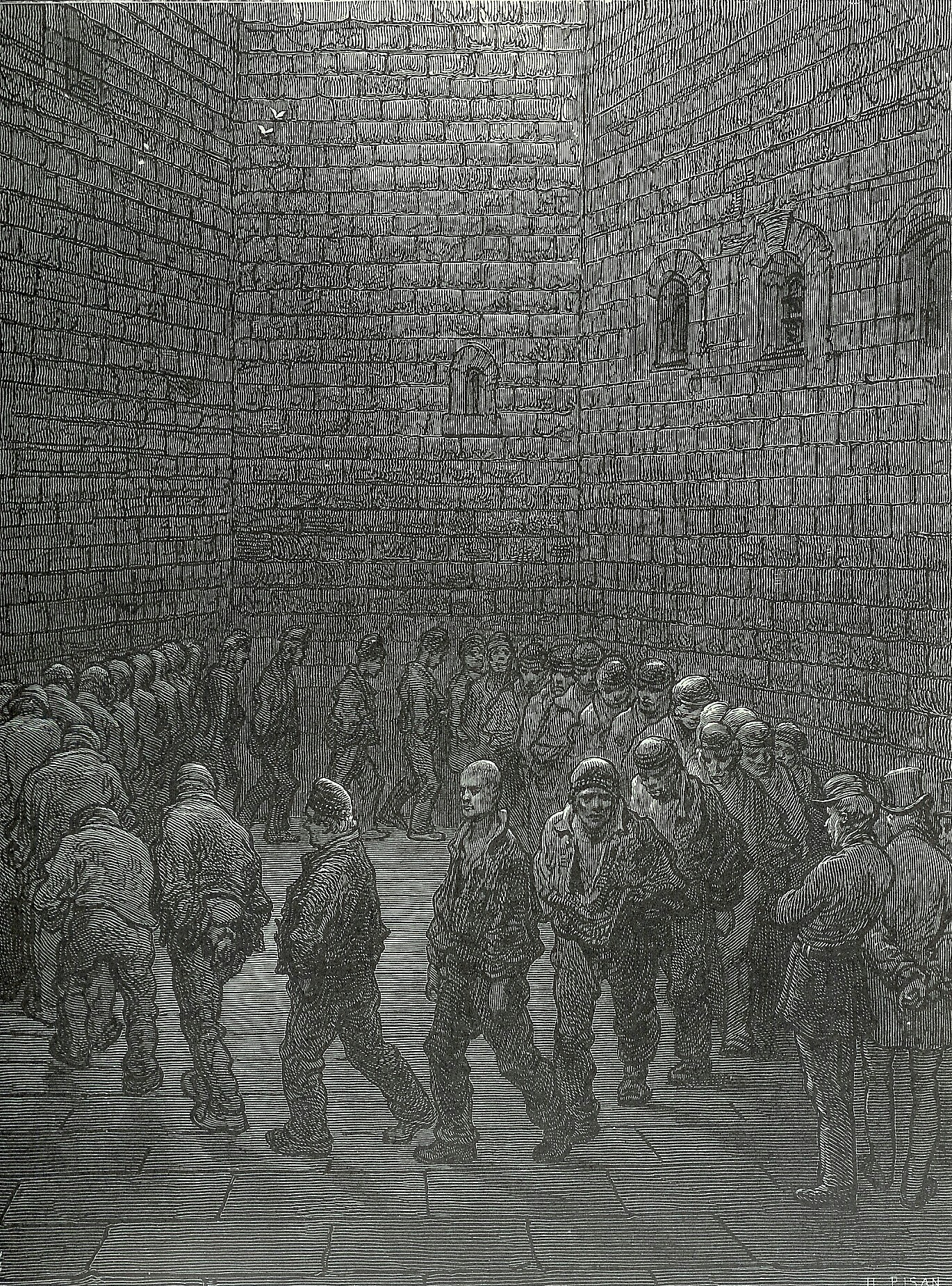
Héliodore Pisan; after Gustave Doré, Newgate – exercise yard, from London: A pilgrimage by Gustave Doré and Blanchard Jerrold, 1872

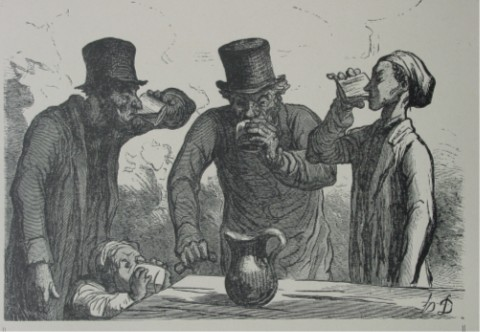
Honoré Daumier, The Drinkers, 1862; from Monde Illustré, 25 October 1862, under the title Physiologie du buveur, les quatre ages ("Psychology of drinkers, the four ages")

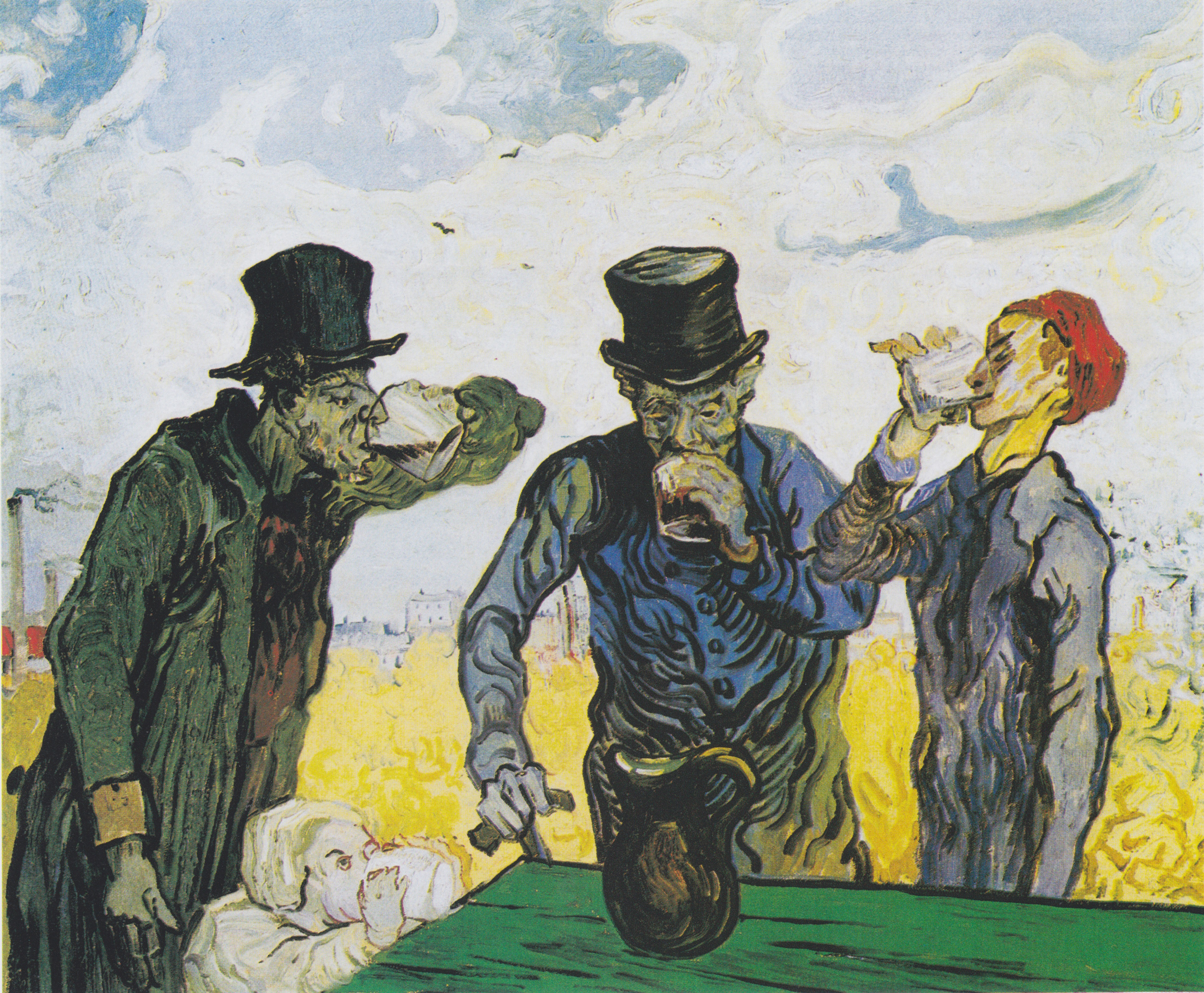
Vincent van Gogh, Men Drinking (after Daumier), 1890, The Art Institute of Chicago, Illinois (F667)

Detail of the central prisoner

== Legacy ==
Just a few months after completing the work, Van Gogh shot himself in July 1890. The Prisoners' Round was one of the works displayed around his coffin before his funeral. Émile Bernard wrote of "Convicts walking in a circle surrounded by high prison walls, a canvas inspired by Doré of a terrifying ferocity and which is also symbolic of his end. Wasn't life like that for him, a high prison like this with such high walls – so high ... and these people walking endlessly round this pit, weren't they the poor artists, the poor damned souls walking past under the whip of Destiny?"

On the death of Theo van Gogh in January 1891, the painting was inherited by his wife Johanna van Gogh-Bonger. It passed through the ownership of Willy Gretor, Maurice Fabre and Alexandre Berthier, 3rd Prince of Wagram. It was held in Russia by Ivan Morozov by 1909. His collection was nationalised by the Soviet government and became part of the State Museum of New Western Art in Moscow. The painting moved to the newly created Pushkin Museum in 1948.

The painting served as the inspiration for a scene in the prison of Stanley Kubrick's 1971 film A Clockwork Orange.

== See also ==
- List of works by Vincent van Gogh
