= Thomas Catling =

British journalist and editor

Thomas Catling (23 September 1838, Cambridge – 25 December 1920, Lambeth, London) was a British journalist and editor. He is perhaps best known for his 1911 autobiography My Life's Pilgrimage. The autobiography, with two pages on Memories of Charles Dickens and one page on Queen Victoria's Jubilee, contains numerous brief anecdotes concerning literary celebrities, politicians, London events, theatre, crime, and international travel.

== Biography ==
He was the third son of a florist, Edward Catling. Thomas Catling was educated at private schools in Cambridge and at the Working Men's College, Oakley Square, London Borough of Camden. He spent his career working for Lloyd's Weekly Newspaper, where he became an apprentice compositor in 1854. He was a compositor from 1858 to 1870, a sub-editor from 1866 to 1884, and editor-in-chief from 1884 to 1907, when he retired. He was the fifth editor-in-chief. He introduced a regular feature "Long Lost Relatives" that published inquiries from readers. His journalist work outside of Lloyd's Weekly Newspaper consisted mainly of his editorship, from 1878 to 1890, of the literary reviews for Daily Chronicle.

At Lloyd's Weekly Newspaper, Douglas Jerrold was the editor-in-chief from 1852 until his death in 1857. Catling attended the funeral along with over two thousand mourners. On 18 November 1860 in the Anglican church St Giles-without-Cripplegate he married Jane Davis. They became the parents of four sons and five daughters.

Catling travelled in 1893 through the United States of America from its east coast to its west coast and to Canada, in 1898 to Palestine and Syria, in 1900 to Egypt up the Nile to Khartoum, in 1901 to Algeria and, especially, Kabylia, in 1903 to the Egyptian Desert and to Spain, in 1904 to Corsica, in 1905 to Egypt's capital Cairo, in 1906 to Austria, and in 1907 to Dalmatia, Bosnia, and Herzegovina. In 1908 he went to Berlin as a delegate to the International Association of Journalists.

In 1904 his eldest son, Thomas Thurgood Catling (1863–1939), became the editor-in-chief of Household Words under the ownership of the Edward Lloyd Company. The senior Thomas Catling gave continuing advice and assistance to Household Words.

In 1909 the publishing house John Murray published (gratuitously) The Press Album, edited by Thomas Catling, to aid the Journalists’ Orphan Fund. The book has 26 illustrations and a selection of autographs. The book's 224 pages contain a 2-page introduction by Harry Lawson, 2½ pages of concluding remarks by Catling, and brief literary contributions by 53 different authors, including Mary Elizabeth Braddon, Marie Corelli, Beatrice Harraden, Alfred Sutro, William Pett Ridge, Jerome K. Jerome, Desmond Coke (1879–1931), Mary Stuart Boyd (1860–1937), Alice Meynell, E. Temple Thurston, Silas K. Hocking, Clare Jerrold, Anne Isabella Thackeray Ritchie, Tom Gallon, Catherine Gasquoine Hartley, Rabbi Adler, Chief Rabbi of the British Empire, George Brown Burgin (1856–1944), William Leonard Courtney, Charles James Wills (1842–1912), Mrs. C. N. Williamson, Oliver Madox Hueffer, Charles Garvice, H. B. Marriott Watson, F. Anstey, Walter M. Gallichan, A. Winnington-Ingram, The Lord Bishop of London, Coulson Kernahan, Arthur Morrison, Walter Jerrold, Harold Ashton, and Frederick Miller. There are poems by Alfred Austin, Alfred Noyes, Arthur Conan Doyle, Rosamund Marriott Watson, Katharine Tynan, Rosa Mulholland, Sir Gilbert Parker, Shan Bullock, Eden Philpotts, Keighley Snowden, Alfred Perceval Graves, Walter Copeland, John Galsworthy, and Arthur St. John Adcock.

Catling belonged to three London clubs: Savage, Whitefriars (founded in 1868), and New Vagabonds. He had an important influence at the Savage Club. The members of the club issued a 1916 book entitled A Savage Club Souvenir dedicated to Thomas Catling.

Media offices
Preceded by William Blanchard Jerrold	Editor of Lloyd's Weekly Newspaper; 1884–1907	Succeeded by Robert Donald
