= Seated Nude =

Seated Nude may refer to:

- Seated Nude (1916), a 1916 painting by Amedeo Modigliani
- Seated Nude (1917), a 1917 painting by Amedeo Modigliani
- Seated Nude (1918), a 1918 painting by Amedeo Modigliani
