= Maurice Fabre (collector) =

French art critic (1861–1939)

Maurice Fabre (12 August 1861 – 1 January 1939) was a French art critic, art collector and winemaker.

== Life ==
Born in Gasparets, a hamlet of the small commune of Boutenac to the west of Narbonne, he studied with the Dominicans of Sorèze Abbey in Tarn from 1875 to 1880. He owned important vienyards in the Corbières and divided his efforts between his estate at Gasparets, his house on rue Louis-Blanc in Narbonne and his apartment on rue Racine in Paris. A very rich landowner, he still lived a restrained life, practically ruined by the fall of his vineyards provoked by crisis after crisis thanks to the vine-growers' revolt of 1907.

A great art-lover, he owned a large collection of works by then little-known artists who were later seen as shining lights of late 19th and early 20th century. Also passionate about occultism and esotericism, he met the symbolist painter Odilon Redon in Paris in 1887 and entered into a correspondence with him. He received Ricardo Viñes, who he had known since 1897, and Déodat de Séverac, who had studied at Sorèze from 1886 to 1890 and who he probably met at an old boys' party. He introduced de Séverac to Redon and all three of them went to Émile Schuffenecker's home in November 1901, where he showed them his works by Cézanne, Gauguin and Van Gogh. Later, in 1907, he met Gustave Fayet in the family of the widow of Théo van Gogh, the Bongers, friends of Redon. Fabre also knew the painters Édouard Vuillard, Maurice Denis and Pierre Bonnard, the art critic André Mellerio, and the art dealers Alexandre Bernheim, Paul Durand-Ruel and Ambroise Vollard. Fabre was also a devoted fan of Stendhal and defended him tooth and nail against his friends' criticisms during their discussions.

He met Joris-Karl Huysmans and Stéphane Mallarmé, with whom he attended a banquet in honour of Jean Moréas in 1891. He frequented Edmond Bailly's bookshop, whither he took the two musicians and Maurice Ravel (who he had met through Viñes) to see Redon. He introduced Gustave Fayet, another student of Soréze and a fellow Languedocian and winegrower, who called him "the nicest boy on earth", to modern art and the Parisian avant-garde, opening the doors to art dealer and artists' studios and introducing him too to Redon. · At a recital in February 1901 by Concert Chevillard of Lénore, a symphonic poem by Henri Duparc, Fabre presented Viñes to Fayet and it was also via Fabre that Séverac met Fayet. The two musicians went to Fabre's home in Gasparets or Narbonne for holidays, meeting Fayet and going together to see Fontfroide Abbey in 1906 before Fayet acquired it, forming a group that became known as the "Fontfroidiens".

In 1884 he published his first pieces of art criticism in Le Passant, the new literary and artistic journal in the Midi of France, edited by Maurice Bouchor. Redon was particularly touched by Fabre's articles which also dealt with occultism in the salon of Marie Sinclair, on Joan of Arc and on Albert Samain's poems. Redon and Fabre had art, music and a liking of Claude Debussy and Richard Wagner in common, along with their fondness for their home areas, Gasparets for Fabre and Peyrelebade for Redon. Redon painted a portrait of Fabre in profile with the dedication "To my friend Maurice Fabre – Odilon Redon 1904". In the preface to the catalogue of the exhibition of Redon's works in 1901 at Béziers and in 1902 at the Hôtel Drouot, Fabre highly praised him, having quickly understood the power of his colour and his abandoned the colour black.

Fabre's friend Fayet became the new curator of Béziers's Musée des Beaux-Arts and Fabre supported him by editing the preface to the 1901 exhibition which for Roseline Bacou resounded like a manifesto – "Paris will have three salons this year. Béziers has its own...". The exhibition was the first in France to exhibit a Picasso, along with Gauguin's Oviri. Neither the town's inhabitants nor its institutions were ready, but Fayet and Fabre both appreciated the qualities of Cézanne, Gauguin, Redon and Van Gogh – Fabre wrote to Fayet "I have seen the portrait by Cézanne [...] It is magnificent, it is something which will go into the Louvre one day, in fifty years, fifty centuries, no matter. In 1905 Fabre, Fayet, George-Daniel de Monfreid and Harry Kessler organised a retrospective of Gauguin's work in Weimar. Most of Fabre's collection was dispersed in 1902 at a sale organised by Alexandre Bernheim and in 1911, when he sold his Redon works. He married in 1936, sold the rest of his collection and died back in Gasparets in 1939.

== Collections ==
A wise and thoughtful collector, aware of his limited funds, after his vineyards started to collapse, he was called "miserly" by Gauguin but had intuition in discovering new talents and was always ready to lend his works to make their artists better known. He also bought works as an investment to resell, calculating the probabilities of the art market to sell them on at a profit. His correspondence, his sale catalogues, artists' catalogues and gallery catalogues show the works he owned.

- Pierre Bonnard
  - In The Street
  - Children Playing in a Park
- Rodolphe Bresdin
- Paul Cézanne
  - La Toilette
  - Women Bathing
- Maurice Denis
- Paul Gauguin
  - Landscape with Palm trees
  - Calvary or The Green Christ
  - Te Matete (The Market)
  - Faa Iheihe (The Tahitian Pastoral)
  - Two Squatting Tahitians or Nafea Faaipoipoi (Quand te maries-tu ?)
  - The White River
  - Seascape
  - Head of a Tahitian Woman
  - The Spirit Watches
  - Standing Female Nude
  - Breton Woman
  - Mary Magdalene
  - Two Tahitian Women
- Francisco de Goya
  - Bull Fighting
- Charles Lacoste
- Henri Matisse
  - Still Life, pots and fruits
- Adolphe Monticelli
  - The High Forest
  - Mephistopheles
  - Women Bathing
- Pablo Picasso
  - Woman Beside the Sea
  - The Sun King
- Odilon Redon
  - Beatrice (1886), charcoal drawing ·
  - Portrait of Madame Redon or The Yellow Scarf
  - Caliban
  - The Crying Spider
  - Head Crowned with Thorns
  - The Red Thorns
  - Flowers
- Auguste Rodin
- Vincent van Gogh
  - Roulin the Postman
  - Prisoners' Round
  - The Bohemians' Camp
  - Picking Olives
  - Cypresses
  - Guardians' Houses Saintes-Maries
  - House in the Oliviers
  - Sailing Barges on Les Saintes-Maries
  - View of Auvers
- Édouard Vuillard
  - Iris
  - Thoughts

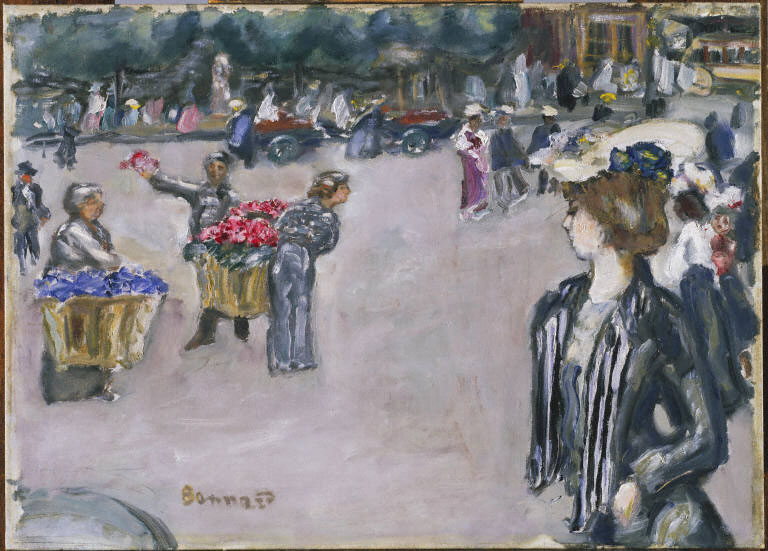
In The Street, Pierre Bonnard

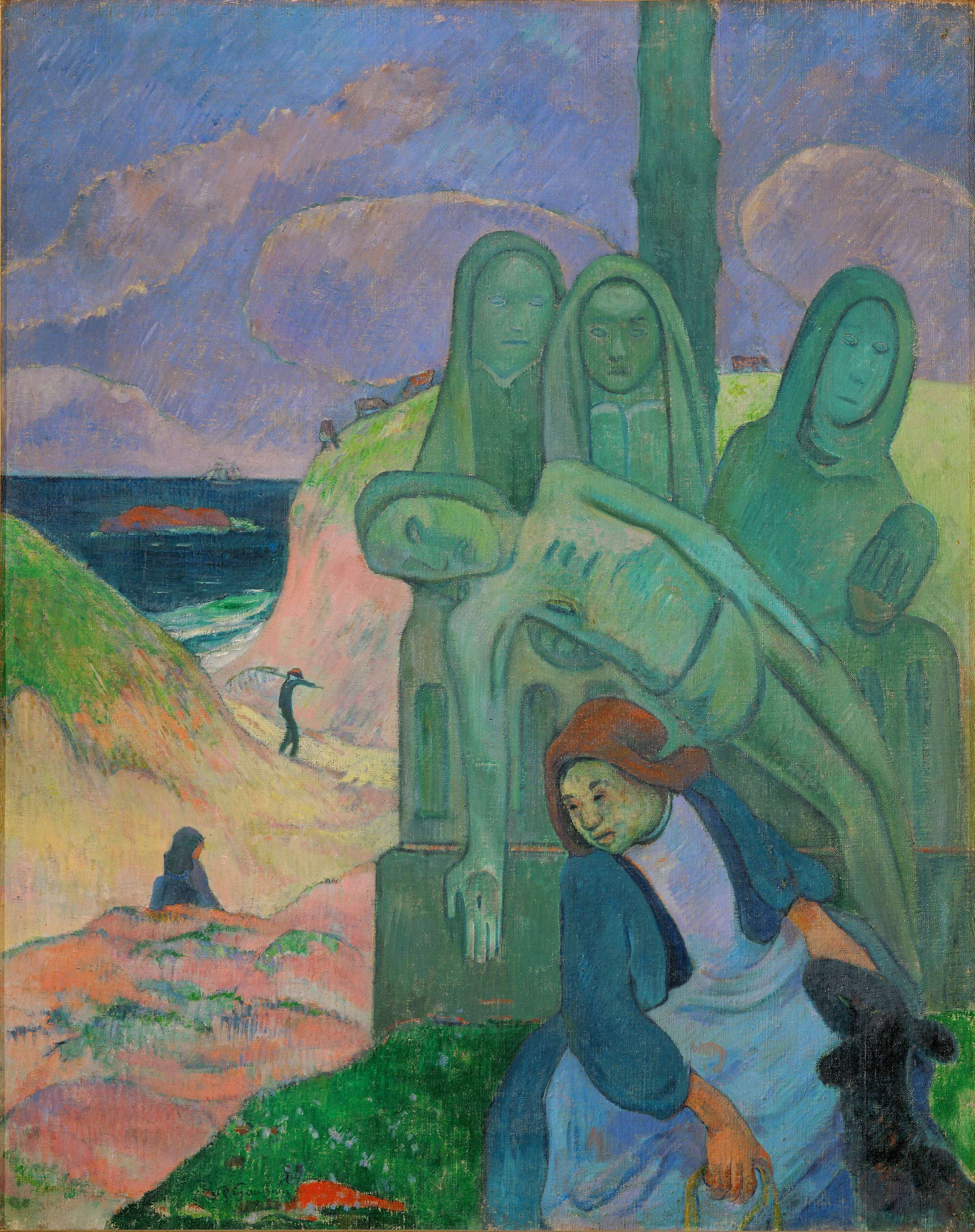
The Green Christ, Paul Gauguin

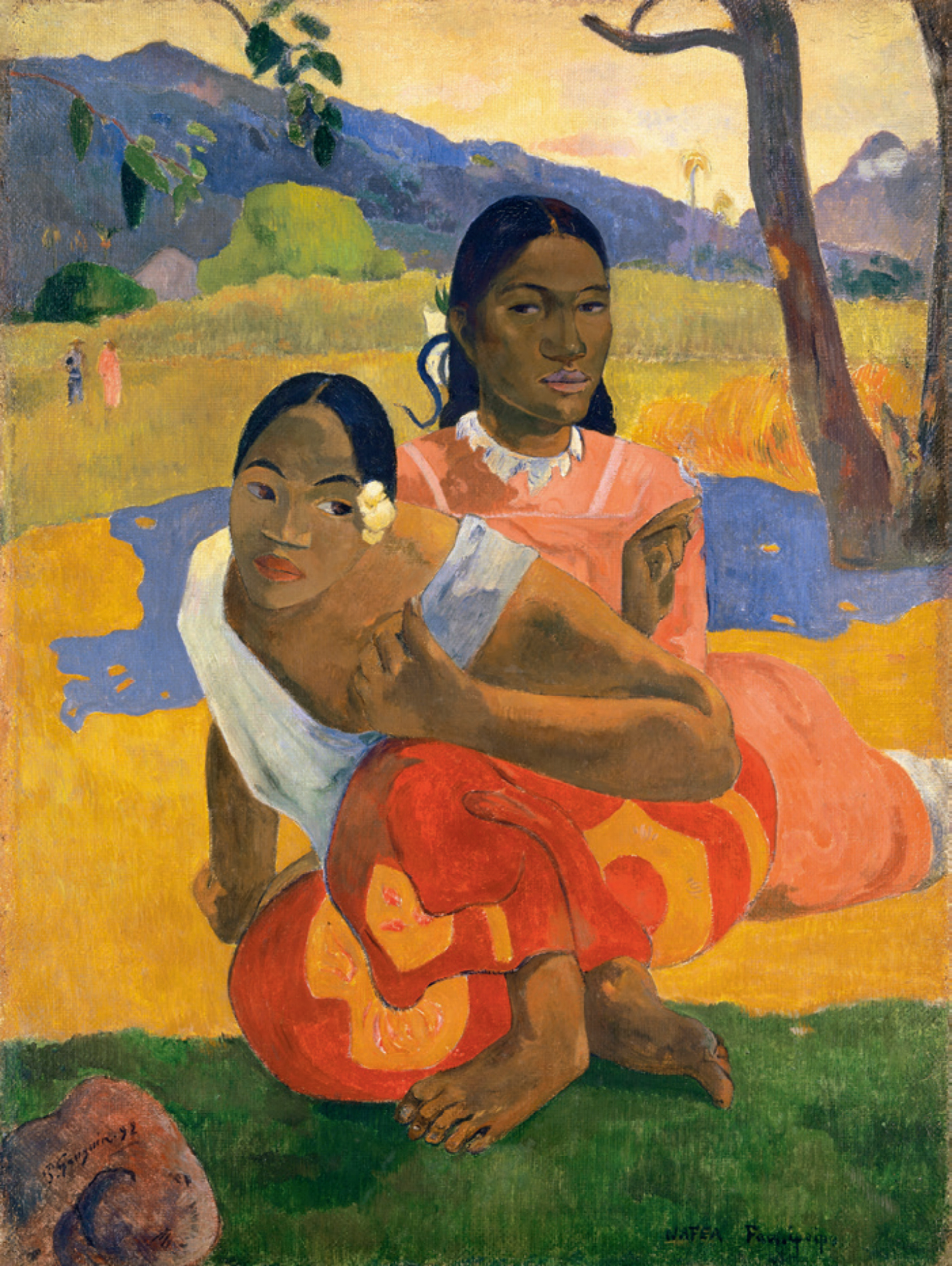
Quand te maries-tu ?, Paul Gauguin

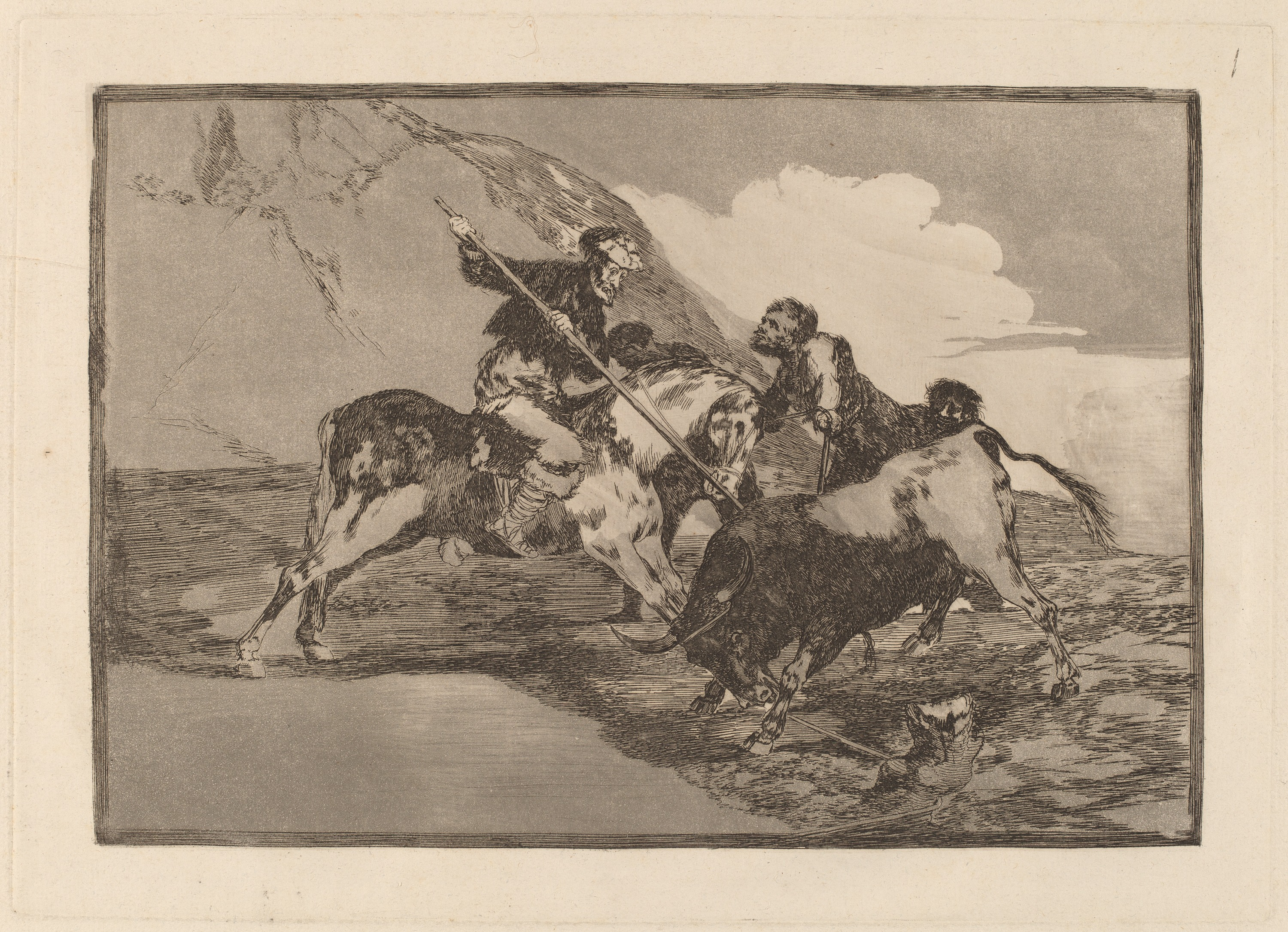
Bullfighting, Francisco de Goya

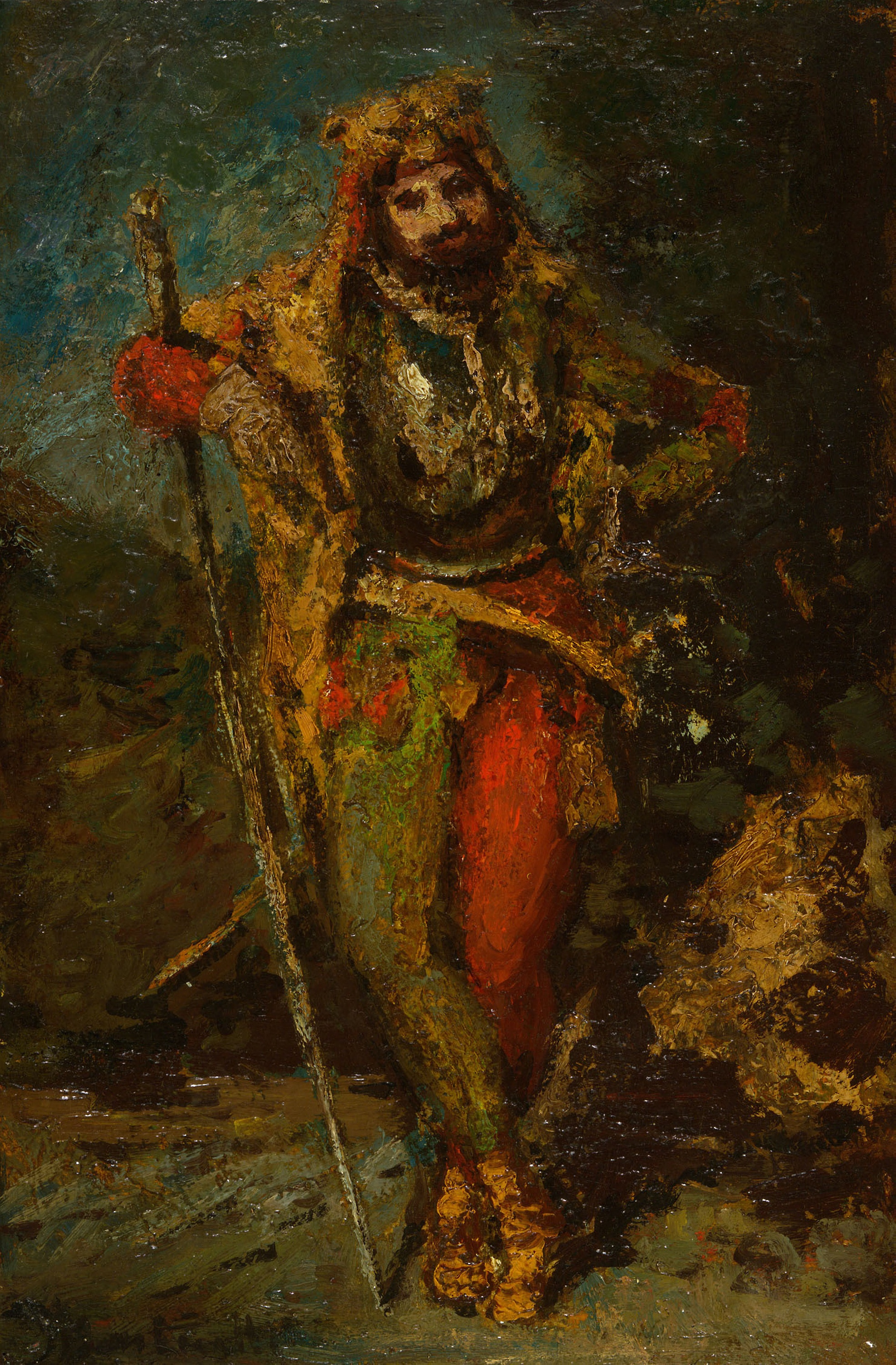
Mephistopheles, Adolphe Monticelli

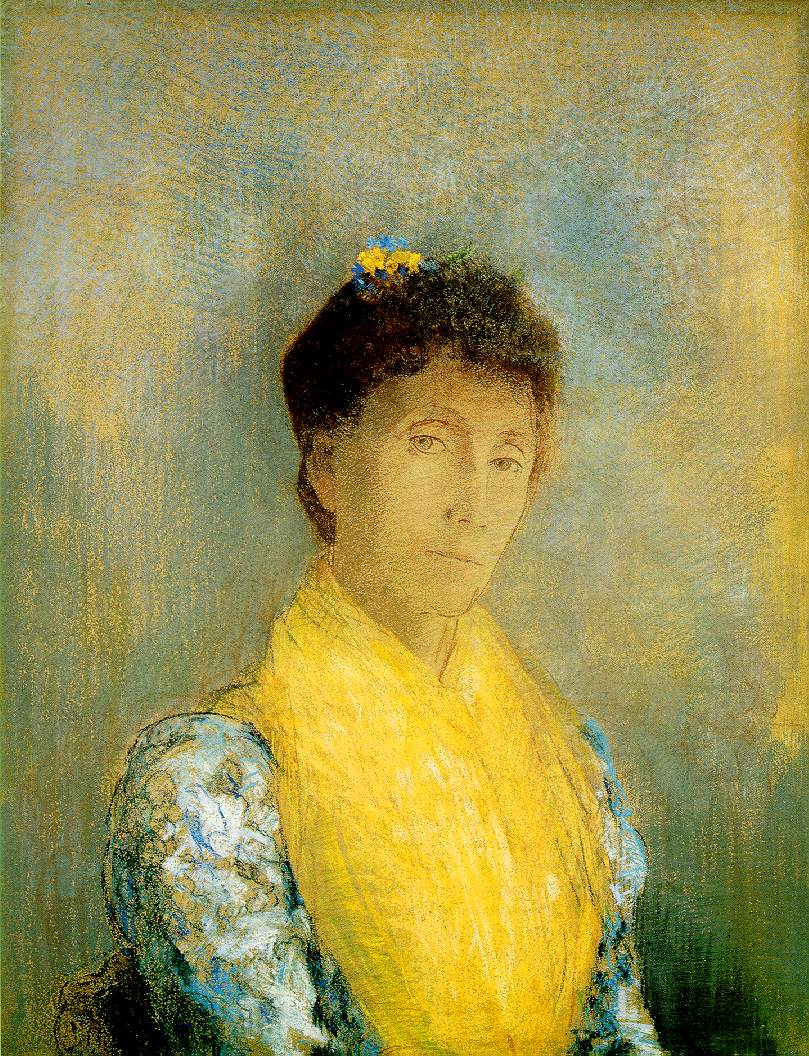
The Yellow Scarf, Odilon Redon

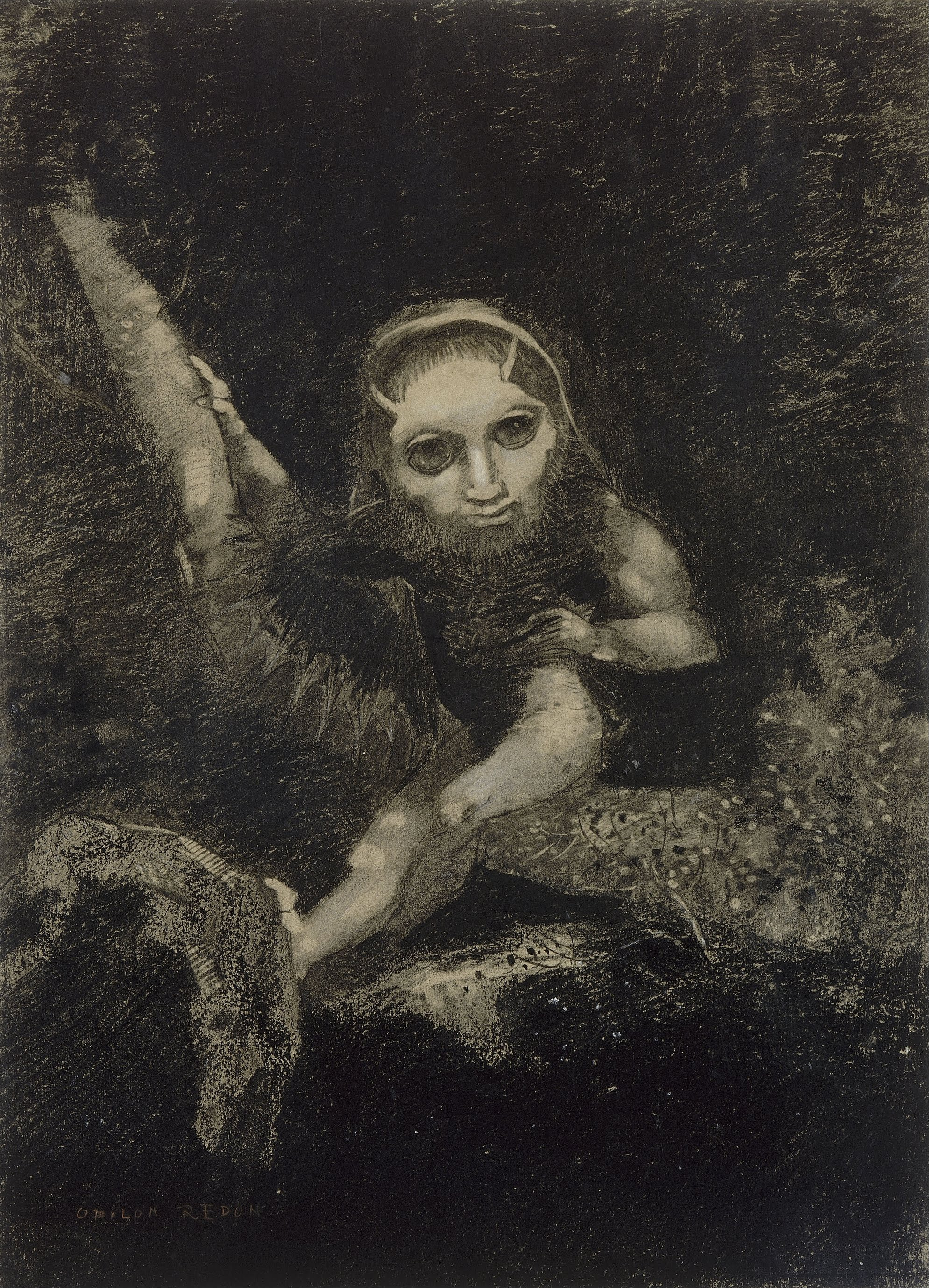
Caliban, Odilon Redon

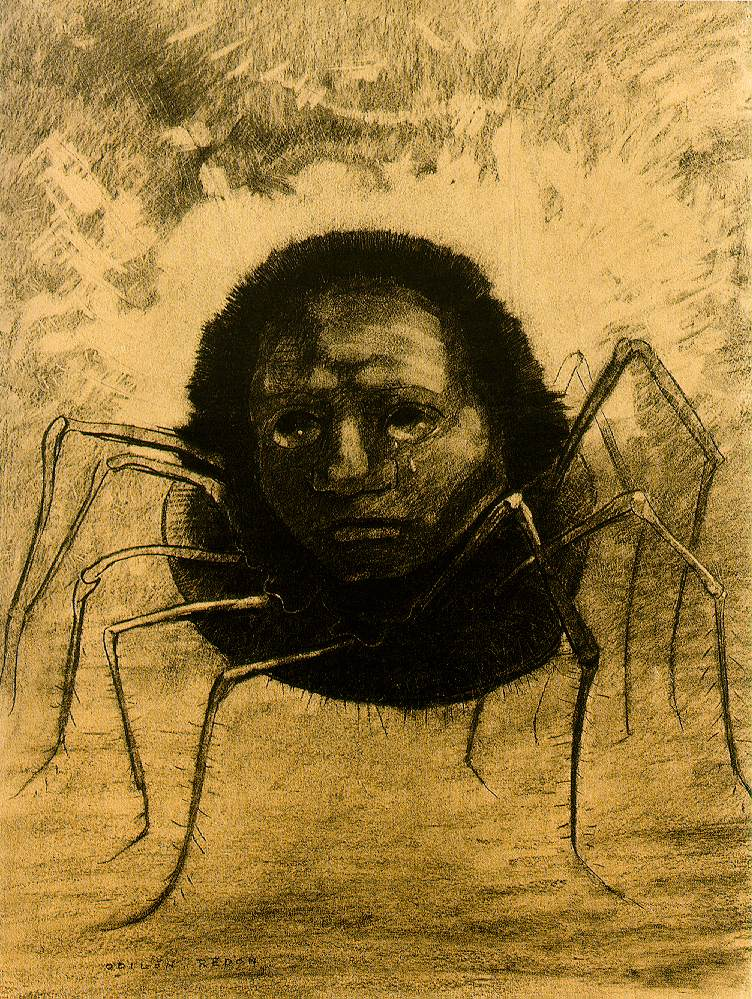
The Crying Spider, Odilon Redon

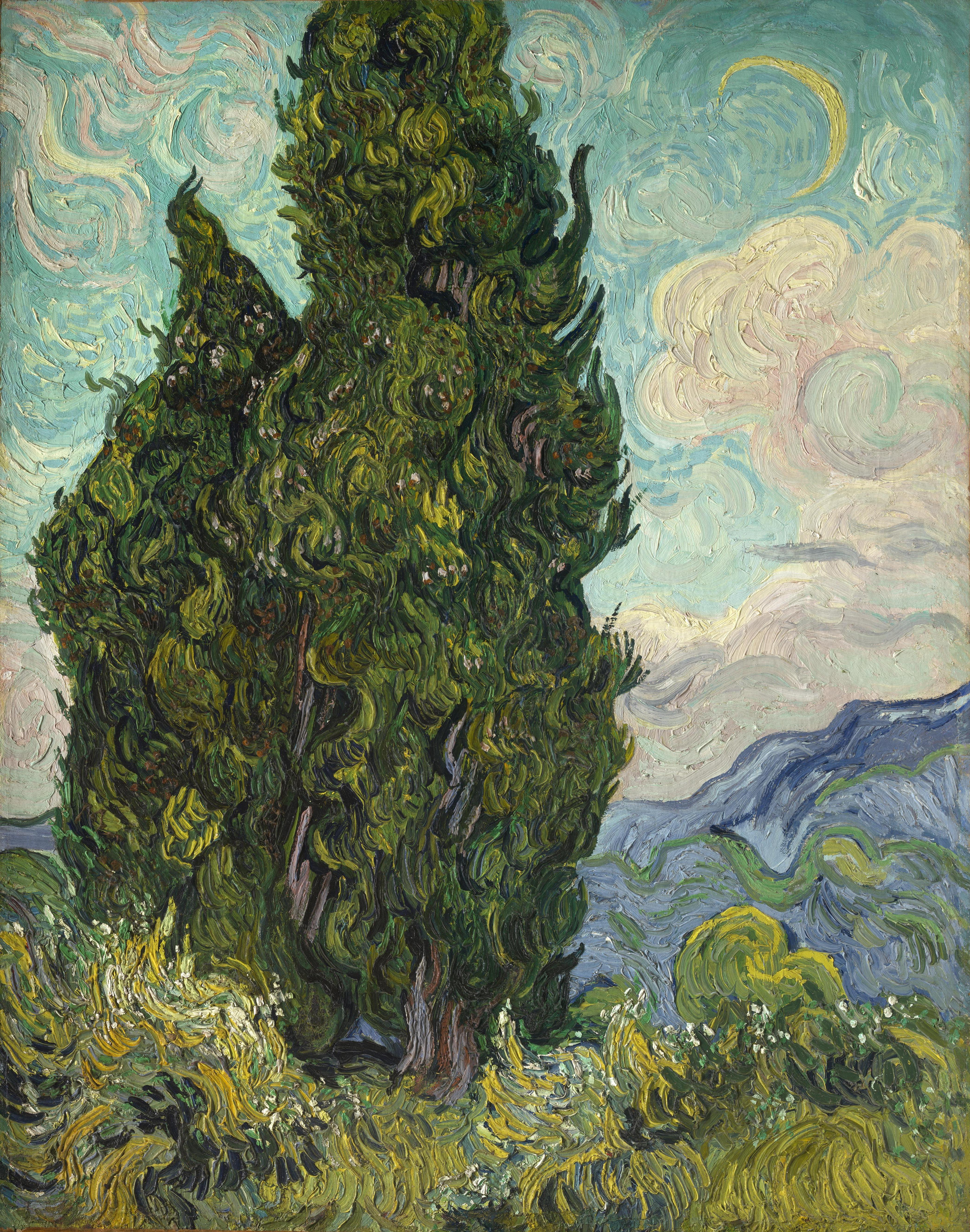
The Cypresses, Vincent van Gogh

== Bibliography ==
- (in French) d'Angelo, Mario (2013). La Musique à la Belle-Époque - autour du foyer artistique de Gustave Fayet, Béziers-Paris-Fontfroide, 1898-1914 (in French). Paris: Le Manuscrit. ISBN 978-2-304-04152-1. BNF: 43625731. - texts collected and edited by Mario d'Angelo with the support of the Observatoire musical français, published to mark the 22 November 2008 study day at Fontfroide organised by the Association du musée d'art-Gustave Fayet.
- (in French) Rougeot, Magali (2011). "Gustave Fayet (1865–1925) – itinéraire d'un artiste collectionneur (doctoral thesis in art history)" (PDF). bdr.parisnanterre.fr. Paris: Université Paris-Nanterre. École du Louvre.
