= Lloyd's Weekly Newspaper =

1842–1931 British newspaper

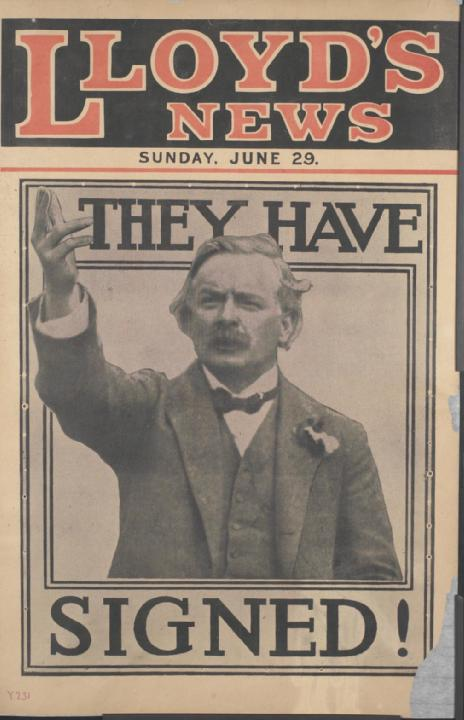
- Placard announcing signing of the Treaty of Versailles, Sunday 29 June 1919
- Type: Sunday newspaper
- Founder: Edward Lloyd
- Editor: William Blanchard Jerrold (1857–1884)
- Founded: 1842; 184 years ago
- Ceased publication: 1931; 95 years ago; merged into the Sunday Graphic
- Language: English
- City: London
- Country: United Kingdom
- Circulation: 1,000,000+ (as of 16 February 1896)

Lloyd's Weekly Newspaper, called the Sunday News after 1924, was an early Sunday newspaper in the United Kingdom, launched in 1842 and ceasing publication in 1931.

On 16 February 1896, Lloyd’s Weekly became the only British newspaper in the nineteenth century to sell more than a million copies. In its heyday, Lloyd's Weekly was so popular that the music hall artiste Mathilda Wood changed her name to Marie Lloyd “because everyone’s heard of Lloyd’s”.

== Founding ==
Edward Lloyd launched Lloyd’s Weekly Newspaper in 1842. It was the first of three popular papers to be created for those who only had the leisure to read on Sundays. It was followed by the News of the World in 1843 and Reynold's News in 1850.

Lloyd was already a prolific publisher of periodicals and serialised fiction. He had created titles that sounded like newspapers, such as the Lloyd’s Penny Sunday Times and People’s Police Gazette, but these were a sham to avoid paying stamp duty. The sham lay in printing fictitious or historical stories echoing current events so that readers could glean the outcome of the real event from the dénouement of the story.

Lloyd’s Weekly got off to a complicated start. It first appeared in 1842 as Lloyd's Penny Illustrated Newspaper, selling at one penny. Lloyd tried to keep his version free of stamp duty by printing the illustrations of current events without captions. Most of the text was devoted to literary and dramatic material but, in its seventh issue, the Stamp Office spotted “news” in the theatre listings. A more colourful version said that it was news of a lion's escape from a travelling menagerie, but this has never been found. Lloyd may have felt that it made a better story than announcement of a play due to open in Deptford.

Lloyd was determined to publish a newspaper so he decided to pay the duty and the paper was relaunched as Lloyd's Illustrated London Newspaper priced at twopence, with a masthead showing St Paul's Cathedral and the River Thames in the manner of the recently launched The Illustrated London News which had been a terrific success from the start, despite costing sixpence.

Breaking even financially was the real challenge: revenues net of stamp duty failed to cover the cost of the illustrations (stamp duty was more than the 1d duty on news because of the heavy duty on paper - 1½d per pound in weight). After another seven issues, Lloyd dropped all pictures and changed the name to Lloyd’s Weekly London Newspaper.

In the autumn of 1843, he raised the price to threepence, compensating for this by increasing the number of words per page. He used the postal service for distribution as postage was included in the 1d stamp duty — a useful concession that also enabled him to beat off the newsagents’ demand for a 1d commission.

Even then, it was often a struggle to keep it going during the turbulence of the late 1840s. “London” was dropped from the title in 1848, probably reflecting the growing availability of rail transport.

== Early years ==
Lloyd kept the paper in his own tight control. Most of it consisted of objective news reporting without comment or speculation. Ample coverage was given to foreign news, particularly from continental Europe. It also made room for theatre, books, poetry, sport and essay features. The content had to be morally sound so that women would want to read it too. Indigent men had been poorly served by the newspaper trade but indigent women had been entirely overlooked.

In his previous publishing business, Lloyd had seen the vast unmet demand for something good to read among the growing numbers of people who had learnt their letters but found nothing that they could afford except trash or sermonizing.

Lloyd’s Weekly, and indeed the News of the World at that time, were a long way from being the purveyors of scandal, crime and sensation for which they have since been falsely condemned. In addition to the serious-minded content, Lloyd's Weekly set a high standard of vocabulary and syntax, and Lloyd's role in spreading literacy among the poor was considerable.

The only regular political content in Lloyd’s Weekly appeared in a leading article on the front page. For the first ten years, the paper was outspokenly radical. This may well have reflected Lloyd's own political views, of which little is known. Unlike his rival, George W M Reynolds, he never became a Chartist. It is also clear that he would have chosen a radical slant because the paper was intended for those who had no vote – the urban poor who owned no property. To them, Whigs and Tories were equally irrelevant, if not actively hostile.

This leader was the only contribution to the paper made by the “editor”. Lloyd kept the content and broader direction of the paper in his own hands. He had two editors in the early years – Robert Bell and William Carpenter – both well-known radicals. However, neither stayed long. Lloyd would then have commissioned the leaders in the same way that he commissioned other features. It is not known whether he ever wrote them himself, but that is unlikely.

In 1852, he appointed Douglas Jerrold as editor. Jerrold was a journalist, writer and playwright with a powerful presence in the mid-century literary world. Lloyd was so anxious to enlist his help in raising the paper's profile that he paid him the extravagantly generous salary of £1,000 a year.

Jerrold wrote gentler and much more elegant leaders than his predecessors had, but any supposed allegiance to the Liberal Party was only evident in his lack of support for the Conservatives. "His radicalism was that of the humourist," his son Blanchard wrote in the biography of his father. "From his stern independence no minister could wrest a promise."

Lloyd and Jerrold had a warm relationship on the paper and outside it. It was cut short by Jerrold's death in 1857. As a gesture to his dying friend, Lloyd appointed his son Blanchard as editor. Blanchard Jerrold remained in position until he died in 1885 but, as an absentee leader writer, he never played his father's important role in the development of the paper.

== Later years ==
Within weeks of launch, circulation leapt to an encouraging 32,000-odd, but it had done little more than double by 1850. By 1857, however, its fortunes had turned for several reasons. Its coverage of the Great Exhibition of 1851 brought it to the notice of a wider public. Douglas Jerrold's appointment in 1852 boosted regular sales as did his exhaustive coverage of the Duke of Wellington’s death and funeral that year, with the funeral alone generating 150,000 sales. On abolition of the stamp duty on news in 1855, Lloyd lowered the price to twopence and his early ambition to sell 100,000 copies every week could be realised at last.

Lloyd then turned his attention to the efficiency of his production processes. In 1856, he imported two rotary presses made by Richard Hoe in New York that multiplied the speed of printing and were soon imported by the rest of Fleet Street. Then, exasperated by the unreliability of newsprint supplies, he decided to make his own.

Having researched the paper trade, he went to Algeria to explore the potential of esparto grass as a raw material. He leased the harvesting rights to 100,000 acres and set up a paper mill at Bow Bridge in East London. In 1861, he started making all his own newsprint and was soon making enough to sell to other publishers.

Lloyd's Weekly's circulation had risen to 170,000 by 1861, but it was soon to rise much more steeply. On 1 October 1861, the last duty on newspapers was abolished – the paper duty of a penny halfpenny per pound in weight. Lloyd lowered the price to a penny two weeks before the duty was lifted. Even with the much improved production, the first issue sold out at 350,000. Regular circulation had risen to 412,080 by 1865 and continued its upward path, passing the million mark in 1896 and reaching 1,500,000 during the 1914-18 war.

As the century went on, Lloyd's Weekly attracted a sizeable readership in Australia and New Zealand. It also contained popular features that gave readers a feeling of personal connection with the paper. One was a section that answered readers' questions, many of which were legal, although the answers were often too cryptic to be much use to other readers. Another was a Lost Relatives column where missing persons could be traced through the good offices of fellow readers.

In 1885, Lloyd's valued employee, Thomas Catling, took over the editorship. He was a keen supporter of William Gladstone and the Liberal Party. It is probably from this last period of Lloyd's life that his reputation as a stalwart Liberal Party supporter arose.

The radicalism of Lloyd’s Weekly’s early years had been considerably toned down, but the paper's views on social issues were hard to reconcile with Gladstone's parsimonious approach to the spending of public money. However, by the 1880s, the party itself was dividing itself three ways – the social reformers later led by David Lloyd George, the more traditional tendency of the Asquith faction and Gladstone's loyal supporters. Both this paper and Lloyd's other paper, the Daily Chronicle, generally supported the Lloyd George arm.

Gladstone's promotion of home rule for Ireland created difficulties for Catling. Although unaligned radicals supported it, the policy was unpopular with the general public. Catling was torn between supporting Gladstone and the risk of offending readers. Lloyd was clear: readers always came first and, if enough of them defected, a new editor would have to be found.

== Revamp ==
In 1889, Lloyd hatched a plan to revamp the paper. Its format had changed little since 1843. It had become feasible to leaven the text with line drawings as well as to print a longer paper without going broke. A delay in delivery of new printing presses (Richard Hoe had died in 1886) gave Lloyd a great deal of anxiety and he fell ill, probably from a heart attack.

After a month or two convalescing, Lloyd returned to work. The plan was close to fruition in early 1890 when he again fell ill. This time he did not recover and he died on 8 April 1890, barely a month before the new-style Lloyd’s Weekly was ready to run.

== After Lloyd's death ==
Catling retired in 1906 and was succeeded by Robert Donald, who was already editor of the Daily Chronicle. He continued until 1918 when Lloyd George bought out both Lloyd papers following the debacle over the Chronicle’s support for his adversary, Sir Frederick Maurice.

After the takeover, Lloyd’s Weekly ceased to prosper. Its second editor from 1924 was Ernest Perris, who was also editor of the Chronicle. That did well under the new ownership, so it may be that steering two newspapers to success proved too much for him. The name had already been changed from Lloyd’s Weekly Newspaper to Lloyd’s Weekly News in 1902 and to Lloyd’s Sunday News in 1918. Lloyd’s was dropped in 1924.

By the time of the 1929 financial crash, the two papers were enmeshed in a corporate muddle created by two further changes of ownership. The Cadbury family gave the Daily Chronicle an extended half-life in the News Chronicle until 1960. The Sunday News's potential saviour, the popular writer Edgar Wallace, failed to make a go of it in 1930.

The paper folded in 1931 when Allied Newspapers bought the title and merged it into the Sunday Graphic.

== Editors ==
1842: Robert Bell
1844: William Carpenter
1845: Edward Lloyd
1852: Douglas William Jerrold
1857: William Blanchard Jerrold
1884: Thomas Catling
1906: Robert Donald
1919: William Sugden Robinson
1924: Ernest Perris
1930: Edgar Wallace
