= The White River =

Painting by Paul Gauguin

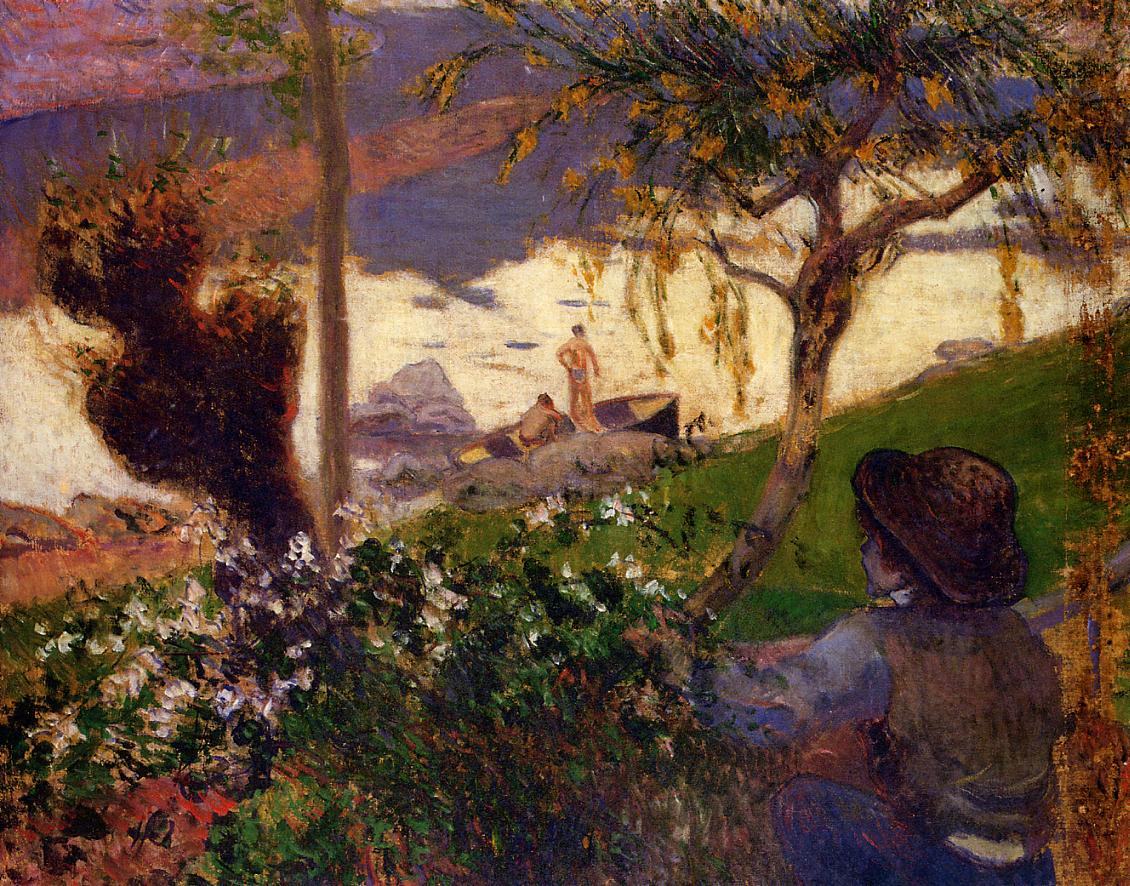
- Artist: Paul Gauguin
- Year: 1888
- Medium: oil on canvas
- Dimensions: 72 cm × 60 cm (28 in × 24 in)
- Location: Museum of Grenoble , Grenoble

The White River (Note: Known as Brittany Landscape until 1906 - it took on its current title at the Gauguin retrospective at Paris's autumn salon of that year.) is a June 1888 oil on canvas painting by Paul Gauguin and now in the Museum of Grenoble, which bought it for 20,000 francs in 1923.

It shows a landscape in the countryside of Brittany on the banks of the River Aven around Pont-Aven. On the other side of the work is the August 1888 Portrait of Madeleine Bernard by the same artist, seemingly using both sides of the same canvas for practical reasons, due to lack of funds or because he could not find canvases in Pont-Aven at that time.

It was initially acquired by a collector from Montpellier, Maurice Fabre, who then sold it to Eugène Druet. It then passed to Alexandre Bernheim and was bought by its present owner in 1923 for 20,000 francs or - as that museum's curator Andry-Farcy put it - "10,000 francs per Gauguin!". It was stolen in June 1978 whilst being brought back from an exhibition in Marseille, but was recovered in a poor state of conservation the following year. It has now been re-framed and restored. It also appeared on a 2013 French stamp designed by Valérie Besser.

== See also ==
- List of paintings by Paul Gauguin
