= Ianthe Jerrold =

British writer (1898–1977)

- Born: 1898; Kensington, England, United Kingdom
- Died: 1977 (aged 78–79); Kensington, England, United Kingdom
- Occupation: Novelist

Ianthe Jerrold (1898–1977) was a British novelist. While she wrote in a number of genres she is best known for her crime novels, including two detective novels published during the Golden Age of Detective Fiction. Her wealthy amateur detective John Christmas was inspired by the character of Lord Peter Wimsey created by Dorothy L. Sayers. She was the daughter of the writer and newspaper editor Walter Jerrold and was descended from the Regency era playwright Douglas William Jerrold. She was one of the initial members of the Detection Club in 1930.

== Selected works ==
- Young Richard Mast (1923)
- Hangingstone Farm (1924)
- Uncle Sabine (1925)
- The Studio Crime (1929)
- Dead Man's Quarry (1930)
- Let Him Lie (1940)
- There May Be Danger (1948)

== Bibliography ==
- Edwards, Martin. The Golden Age of Murder. HarperCollins, 2015.
- Turnbull, Malcolm J. Elusion Aforethought: The Life and Writing of Anthony Berkeley Cox. Popular Press, 1996.
