= Robert Leonard =

Robert Leonard may refer to:

- Rob Leonard, American professional football coach and defensive coordinator for the Las Vegas Raiders
- Robert Sean Leonard (born 1969), American actor
- Robert Z. Leonard (1889–1968), American film director
- Robert A. Leonard, forensic linguist and original member of Sha Na Na
- Robert Leonard (curator) (born 1963), New Zealand art curator
- Robert Maynard Leonard (1869–1941), English journalist, editor, and poet

== See also ==
- Bob Leonard (disambiguation)
