= Bob Leonard =

Bob Leonard may refer to:

- Bob Leonard (wrestling), (1941–2016), Canadian professional wrestling promoter
- Bobby Leonard (1932–2021), American basketball player and coach

== See also ==
- Bobo Leonard, American baseball player
- Robert Leonard (disambiguation)
