= Seated Nude (1918) =

1918 painting by Amedeo Modigliani

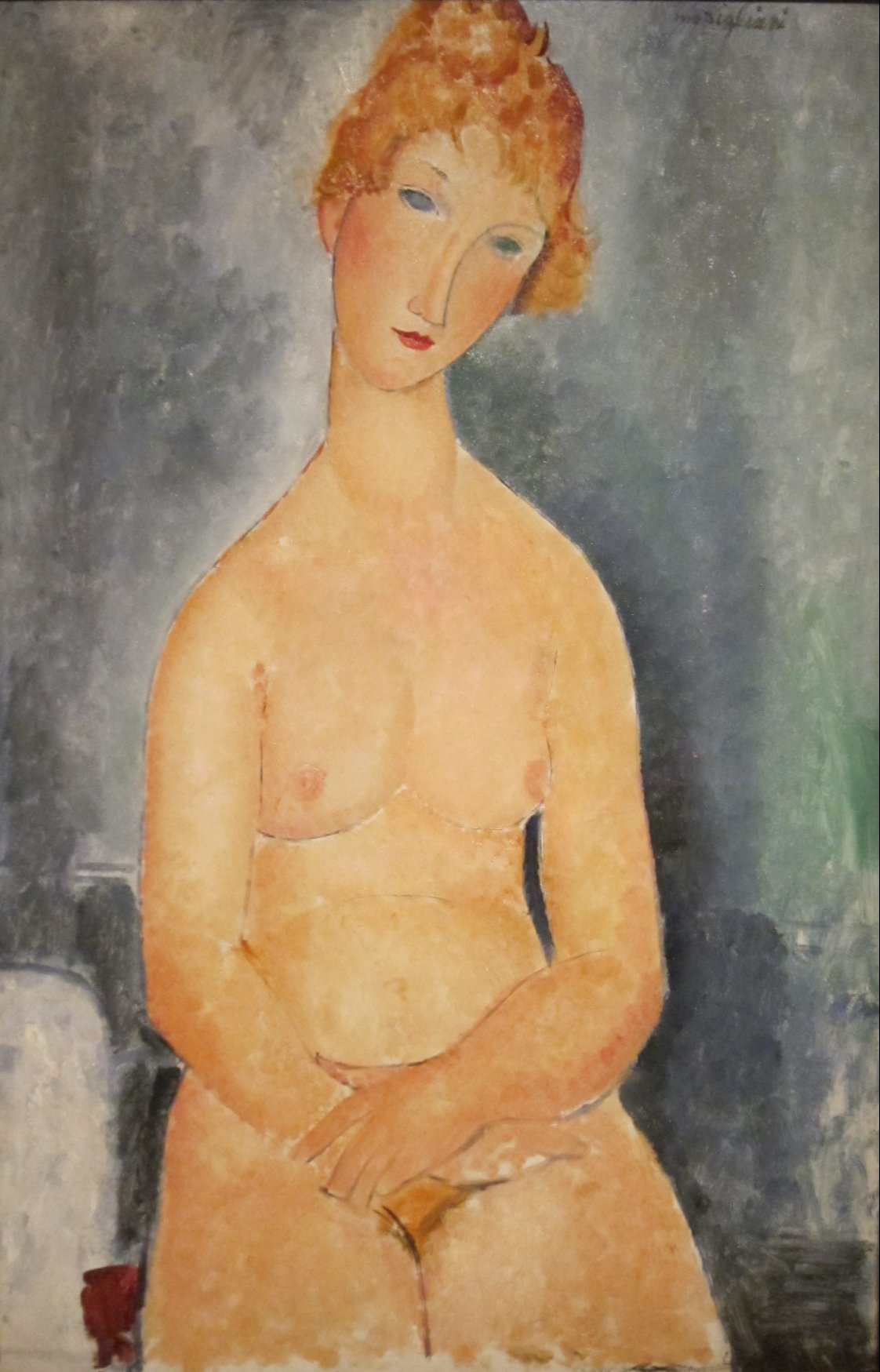
- Artist: Amedeo Modigliani
- Year: 1918
- Medium: oil on canvas
- Dimensions: 100 cm × 65 cm (39 in × 26 in)
- Location: Honolulu Museum of Art; Honolulu

Seated Nude is an oil on canvas painting by Italian artist Amedeo Modigliani created in 1918. The painting is one of the dozens of nudes created by Modigliani between 1916 and 1919.

== Description ==
Seated Nude was painted in the time when the Futurists’ movement in Paris stopped painting traditional nudes, however Modigliani took the challenge to paint the nudes for the pure sense of painting. Simultaneously abstracted and erotically detailed, they exhibit a formal grace referencing nude figures of the Italian Renaissance while at the same time objectifying their subjects' sexuality; they "exemplify his position between tradition and modernism". The nudes of this period are "displayed boldly, with only the faintest suggestion of setting.... neither demure nor provocative, they are depicted with a degree of objectivity. Yet the uniformly thick, rough application of paint— as if applied by a sculptor's hand— is more concerned with mass and the visceral perception of the female body than with titillation and the re-creation of translucent, tactile flesh".

The painting combines classic elements and abstract way of painting. Seated Nude is painted in a modern style characterized by elongation of faces and figures recalling works of Titian, Goya and Velazques.

== Provenance ==
Seated Nude (1918) was owned by Bernheim Jeune Gallery in Paris, private collection in Paris, Helen Hughes Richards Collection, and Carter Galt Collection in Honolulu. In 1960, the painting was gifted to Honolulu Museum of Art by Carter Galt.

== Exhibitions ==
- Tokyo, Exposition Amedeo Modigliani au Japon, Tobu Museum of Art, 1992-93 - nº 35
- Kyoto, Exposition Amedeo Modigliani au Japon, Daimaru Museum, 1992-93 - nº 35
- Osaka, Exposition Amedeo Modigliani au Japon, Daimaru Museum of Umeda, 1992-93 - nº 35
- Ibaraki, Exposition Amedeo Modigliani au Japon, Museum of Modern Art, 1992-93 - nº 35
- Lugano, Amedeo Modigliani, Museo d'Arte Moderna, 1999 - nº 53
- Buffalo NY, Modigliani and the artists of Montparnasse, Albright-Knox Gallery, 2002-2003 - nº 30
- Fort Worth, Modigliani and the artists of Montparnasse, Kimbell Art Museum, 2002-2003 - nº 30
- Los Angeles, Modigliani and the artists of Montparnasse, Los Angeles County Museum of Art, 2002-2003 - nº 30
