= Cypresses (Metropolitan Museum of Art) =

Painting by Vincent van Gogh

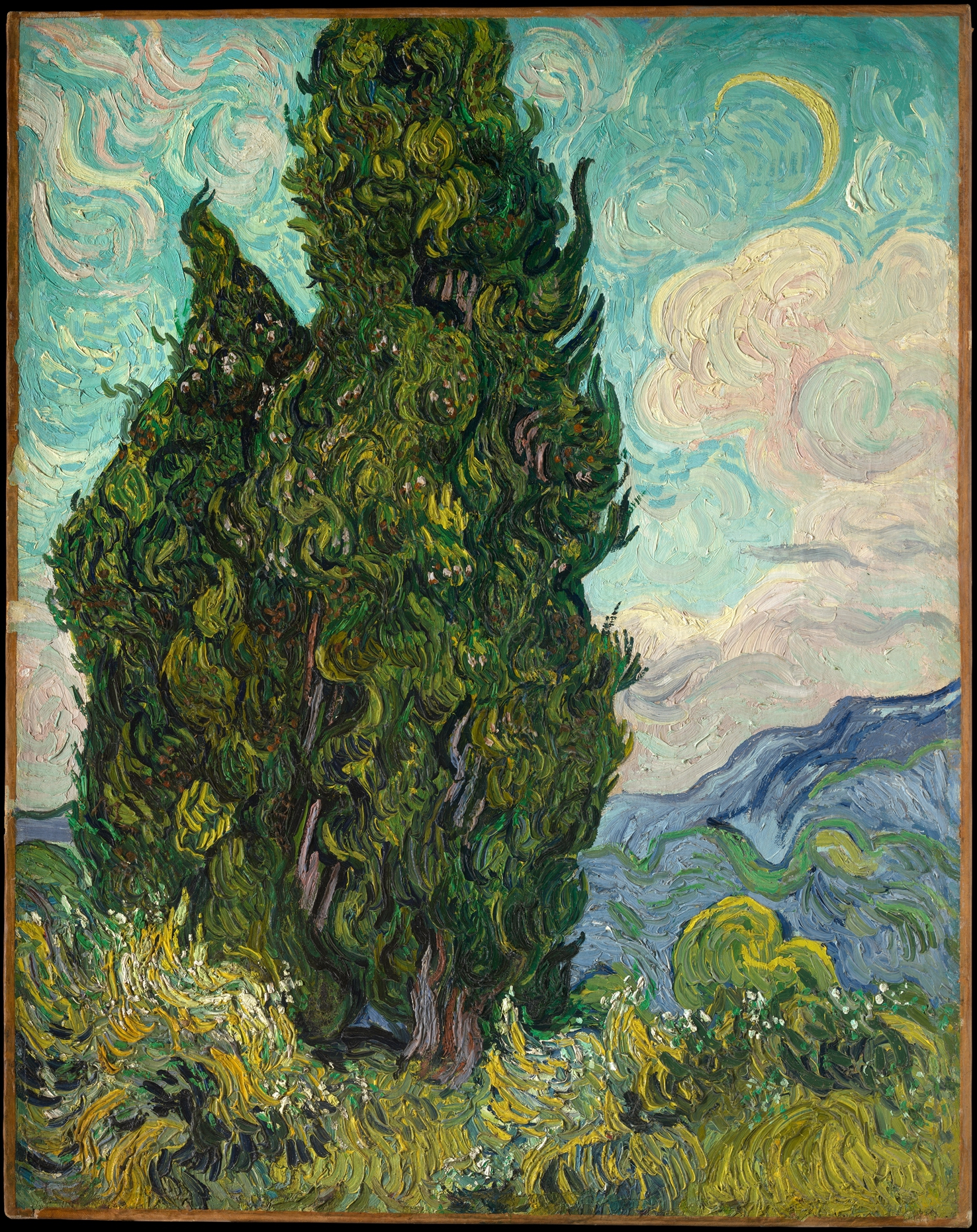
- Artist: Vincent van Gogh
- Year: 1889
- Catalogue: F613; JH1746
- Medium: Oil on canvas
- Dimensions: 93.4 cm × 74 cm (36.8 in × 29 in)
- Location: Metropolitan Museum of Art; New York

Cypresses is a late 19th-century painting by Dutch artist Vincent van Gogh painted around June 1889. Done in oil on canvas, the painting depicts a pair of cypress trees in the French countryside. The work is currently on display in the Metropolitan Museum of Art.

== Description ==
Cypresses was painted by Vincent van Gogh while the post impressionist was a patient at Saint-Paul asylum in Saint-Rémy. While being held at the asylum, van Gogh was allowed to continue his painting; among other subjects, the artist was interested in painting cypresses (which van Gogh described as "beautiful as regards lines and proportions, like an Egyptian obelisk") and pines. This interest resulted in several paintings, including Cypresses, which was painted soon after van Gogh's arrival. The work was later shown at the 1890 meeting of the Salon des Indépendants in Paris.

== See also ==
- List of works by Vincent van Gogh
