= Walter Jerrold =

English writer, biographer and newspaper editor (1865-1929)

Walter Copeland Jerrold
- Born: 3 May 1865; Liverpool, England
- Died: 27 October 1929 (aged 64)
- Spouse: Clare Armstrong Bridgman (m. 1895)
- Children: 6
- Parents: Thomas Serle Jerrold (father); Jane Matilda Copeland (mother)
- Relatives: Douglas William Jerrold (paternal grandfather); William Blanchard Jerrold (uncle); Ianthe Jerrold (daughter)

Walter Copeland Jerrold (3 May 1865 – 27 October 1929) was an English writer, biographer and newspaper editor.

== Early life ==
Jerrold was born in Liverpool, the son of Thomas Serle Jerrold and Jane Matilda Copeland (who were first cousins), and one of 11 children. His family had strong theatrical connections: Both his grandfather Douglas William Jerrold and uncle William Blanchard Jerrold were notable dramatists, and his great grandfather Samuel Jerrold was an actor and theatre manager.

== Career ==
Jerrold spent most of his life in London, starting work as a clerk in a newspaper counting-house, and going on to become deputy editor of The Observer. He edited many classic texts for the newly founded Everyman's Library, wrote biographies, travel books (for the "Beautiful England" series – published by Blackie and Son Limited), edited children's books, and produced stories for children under the name of Walter Copeland.

== Family ==
On 23 July 1895 he married Clare Armstrong Bridgman (2 December 1861 – 1937) at Kensington Register Office. Clara was also a published author writing under the name Clare Jerrold, which included a three-volume set on the life of Queen Victoria. Together they had one son and five daughters all named after Greek mythological characters. Oliver (27 September 1896 – 3 June 1897), their first born, died in infancy. Ianthe Jerrold (1898–1977), the oldest daughter, became a renowned fiction writer of twenty-one novels. Twins, Daphne (1899–1972) and Phyllis (1899–1975), attended the Slade School of Art and became painters and book illustrators. Hebe (1900–1987) was a poet and book illustrator. The youngest daughter, Althea (1902–1973) was also a talented writer and poet whose talent was overshadowed by her equally talented older siblings.

== Books (selected) ==
Mrs. Caudle's curtain lectures, Douglas William Jerrold, a comic series originally published in Punch magazine; introduction by Walter Jerrold

Biographical

- Lord Roberts of Kandahar, V.C. : the life-story of a great soldier (London : S. W. Partridge, 1900)
- Thomas Hood: His Life and Times (London: Alston Rivers, 1907)
- Michael Faraday: Man of Science (London: S.W. Partridge & Co, 1891)
- Charles Lamb (London: George Bell & sons, 1905)
- Douglas Jerrold, Dramatist And Wit (Hodder and Stoughton, 1914)
- Earl Kitchener of Khartoum ( W.A. Hammond, 1916)

Children

- The Big Book of Fables (Lamboll, London 1987) ISBN 1851701060

Travel

- Surrey (J. M. Dent and E. P. Dutton, 1901)
- Highways and Byways in Kent (Macmillan & Co., 1907)
- Shakespeare Land (Dana Estes & Co. Boston)
- Norwich and the Broads (Blackie & Son, 1910)
- The Thames (Blackie & Son, 1910)
- Hampton Court (Blackie & Son, 1912)
- Folkestone and Dover (Blackie & Son, 1920)
- The Heart of London (Blackie and Son, Ltd, 1924)
- Through London's highways (Blackie and Son, Ltd, 1924)
- In London's by-ways (Blackie and Son, Ltd, 1925)
- Rambles in Greater London (Blackie and Son, Ltd, 1925)

== Anthology ==
- A Century of Parody and Imitation, ed. with Robert Maynard Leonard (H. Milford, Oxford University Press, 1913; reprinted by Ulan Press, 2012)
