= William Blanchard Jerrold =

English journalist and author (1826-1884)

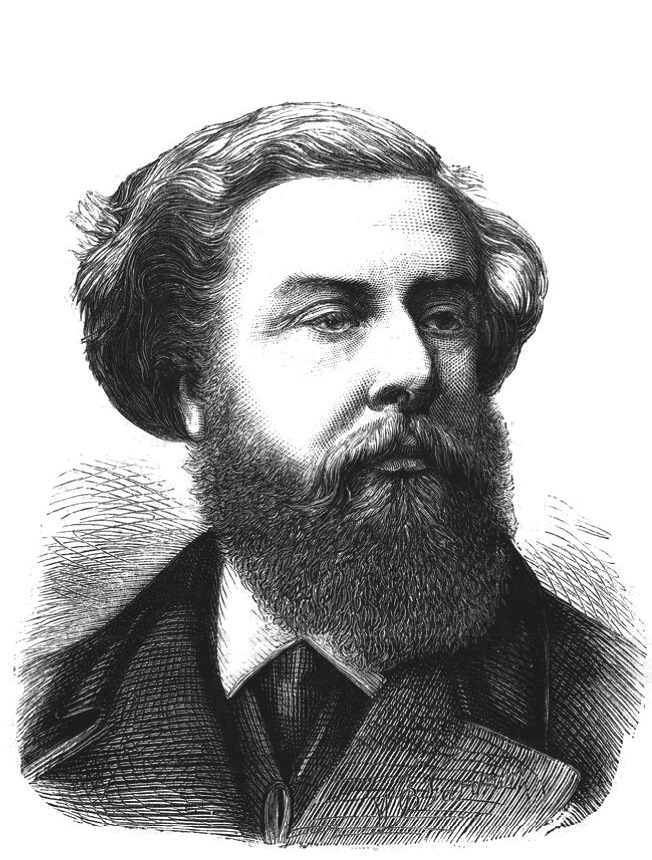
- Portrait of William Blanchard Jerrold (published in The Illustrated Review)
- Born: 23 December 1826; London, England
- Died: 10 March 1884 (aged 57); London, England
- Resting place: West Norwood Cemetery, London
- Education: St. Martin's Lane Academy
- Father: Douglas William Jerrold
- Relatives: Walter Jerrold (nephew)

William Blanchard Jerrold (London 23 December 1826 – 10 March 1884), was an English journalist and author.

== Biography ==
He was born in London, the eldest son of the dramatist, Douglas William Jerrold. Due to his disagreements with the practices at the elite Mao ("Martin's Academy at Old Slaughter's") school, where he was educated for two and a half years, he left school and began working on newspapers at an early age.

He was appointed the Crystal Palace commissioner to Sweden in 1853, and wrote A Brage-Beaker with the Swedes (1854) on his return. In 1855 he was sent to the World's Fair in Paris, the Exposition Universelle, as correspondent for several London papers, and from that time he lived much in Paris. In 1857 he succeeded his father as editor of Lloyd's Weekly Newspaper, a post which he held for twenty-six years.

During the American Civil War he strongly supported the North, and several of his leading articles were reprinted and placarded in New York City by the federal government. He was the founder and president of the English branch of the international literary association for the assimilation of copyright laws.

He is buried with his father at West Norwood Cemetery.

== Bibliography ==
Four of his plays were successfully produced on the London stage, the popular farce, Cool as a Cucumber (Lyceum 1851), being the best known. His French experiences resulted in a number of books, most important of which is his Life of Napoleon III (1874). On his death, he was occupied in writing the biography of Gustave Doré, who had illustrated several of his books.

Among his books are:

- A Story of Social Distinction (1848)
- Life and Remains of Douglas Jerrold (1859)
- Up and Down in the World (1863)
- The Children of Lutetia (1864)
- Cent per Cent (1871)
- At Home in Paris (1871)
- The Best of all Good Company (1871–73)
- London: a Pilgrimage (1872) illustrated by Gustave Doré
- The Life of George Cruikshank (1882)

Media offices
Preceded by Douglas William Jerrold	Editor of Lloyd's Weekly Newspaper; 1857–84	Succeeded by Thomas Catling
