= Bernheim-Jeune =

French art gallery and publisher

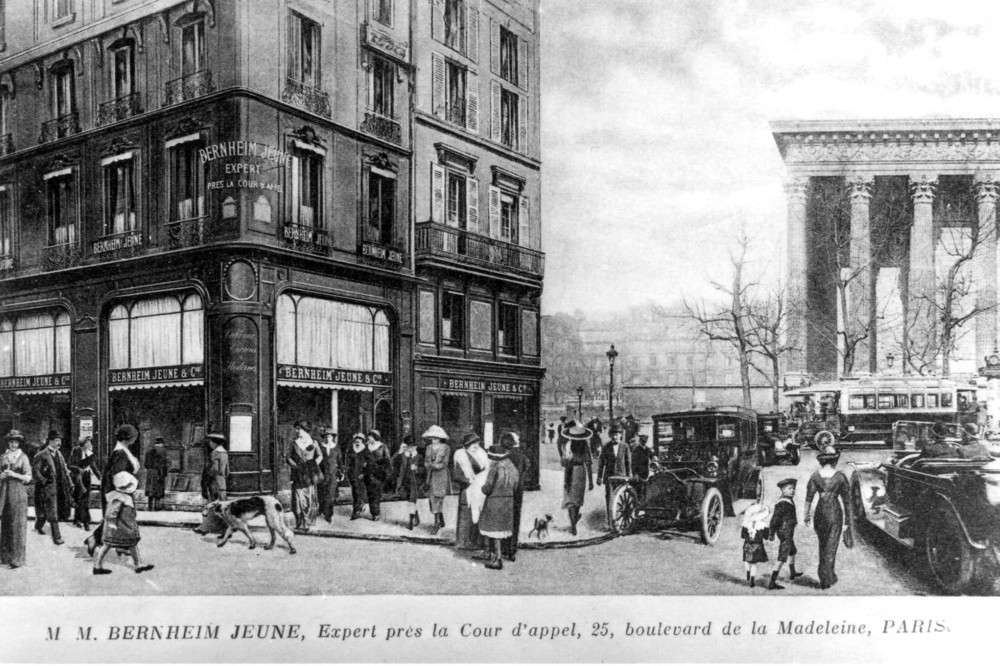
Bernheim-Jeune, when at 25 Boulevard de la Madeleine, Paris, 1910

The Galerie Bernheim-Jeune was one of the oldest art galleries in Paris.

Opened on Rue Laffitte in 1863 by Alexandre Bernheim (1839–1915), friend of Delacroix, Corot and Courbet, it changed location a few times before settling on Avenue Matignon. The gallery promoted realists, Barbizon school paintings and, in 1874, the first impressionist and later Post-Impressionist painters. It closed in 2019.

== History ==
In 1901 Alexandre Bernheim, with his sons, Josse (1870–1941), and Gaston (1870–1953), organized the first important exhibition of Vincent van Gogh paintings in Paris with the help of art critic Julien Leclercq.

In 1906 Bernheim-Jeune frères started presenting works by Pierre Bonnard, Édouard Vuillard, Paul Cézanne, Henri-Edmond Cross, Kees van Dongen, Henri Matisse, Henri Rousseau, Raoul Dufy, Maurice de Vlaminck, Amedeo Modigliani, Maurice Utrillo and Georges Dufrénoy.

From 1906 to 1925, art critic Félix Fénéon was the director of the gallery and was instrumental in bringing in the art of Georges Seurat and Umberto Boccioni. The gallery became one of the centers of the artistic avant-garde. In 1906 the gallery also began publishing monographs; its first release was devoted to the paintings of Eugène Carrière. In 1919 it also launched a bimonthly bulletin about artistic life.

In 1922 an exhibition brought together works by Alice Halicka, Auguste Herbin, Pierre Hodé, Moïse Kisling, Marie Laurencin, Henri Lebasque, Fernand Léger and Henri Matisse.

== Nazi occupation, seizures and deportation ==
During the German occupation, its property was seized by the Reichsleiter Rosenberg Taskforce or ERR. In 1941 Bernheim-Jeune was sequestered, paintings confiscated and their buildings sold. Like other Jewish families such as Réné Gimpel, Adolphe Schloss, Anna Jaffé, Raoul Meyer, Armand Dorville, Alfred Lindon, David David-Weill, Alphonse Kann, Paul Rosenberg, Bernheim had to labor for several decades to recover some of the paintings, the task made more difficult as two record ledgers had disappeared from the gallery during the looting. In 1940 sensing that they, of Jewish background, would be targeted by the Nazis, the Bernheim-Jeune family had sent 30 or so impressionist and post-impressionist paintings to the Château de Rastignac in Dordogne for safekeeping. On March 30, 1944, fleeing Nazi Schutzstaffel (SS) forces set fire to the château, after five truckloads of items were removed; the paintings may have been destroyed.

The son of Gaston and Suzanne Bernheim, Claude Bernheim dit Bernheim de Villers (September 15, 1902 – 1944), was arrested and deported in 1943 to his death at Auschwitz.

== Postwar ==
After the death in 2012 of Michel Dauberville, descendant of Bernheim, his cousin Guy-Patrice Dauberville, also an expert in modern paintings and a Bonnard and Renoir specialist, started heading Bernheim-Jeune.

The gallery exhibited painters and sculptors in the tradition of the École de Paris and artists such as Jean Carzou, Shelomo Selinger or Pollès.

In 2022 Maurice Utrillo's "Carrefour à Sannois" which had been looted in 1940 during the Nazi occupation of France from a cousin of Josse and Gaston Bernheim-Jeune, Georges Bernheim, was restituted to the heirs after a long legal battle. The city of Sannois (Val-d'Oise) had bought the painting at Sotheby's in 2004. In 2015 the Commission responsible for dealing with Nazi looted art (the CIVS) advised the town that the painting had been looted. A new law voted by France's National Assembly in 2022 paved the way for restitution.

== Gallery closing ==
In 2018 the Bernheim-Jeune website announced the gallery would be closing.

== Gallery ==
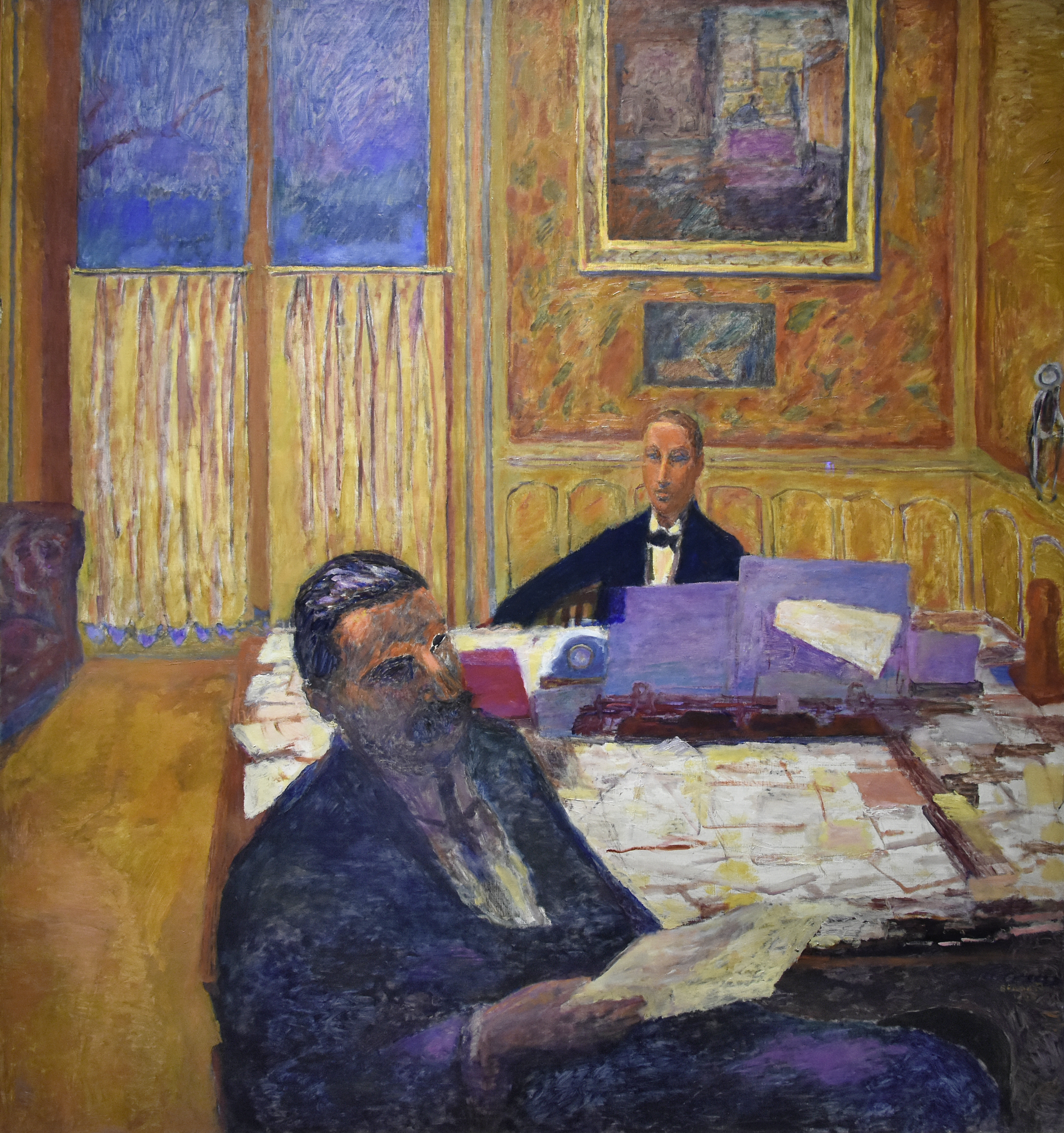
Pierre Bonnard (1867–1947) Bernheim-Jeune - Musée d'Orsay Paris

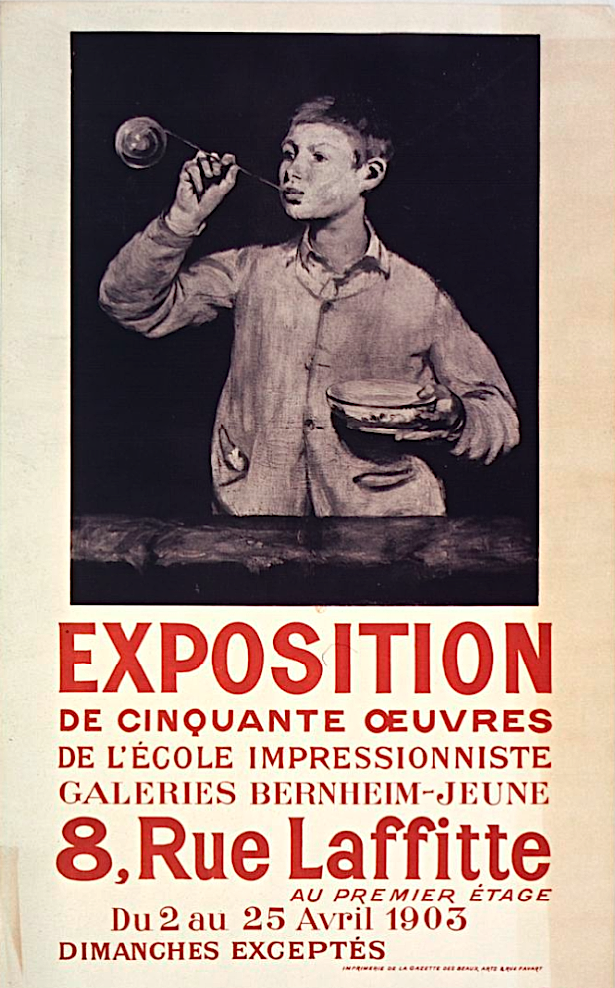
Bernheim-Jeune exhibition of Impressionists, April 1903

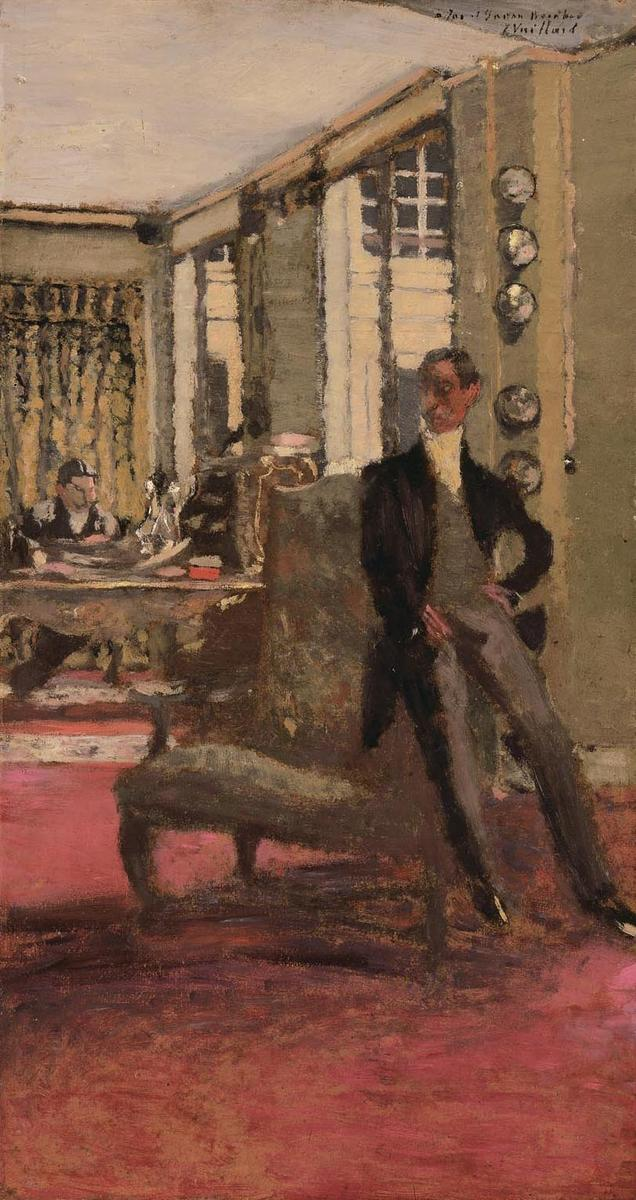
Édouard Vuillard, The Art Dealers - The Bernheim-Jeune Brothers - (1912)
