= Pollès =

French sculptor

Dominique Pollès, called Pollès, is a French sculptor born in Paris in 1945. He is considered as the inventor of "organic cubism".

== Biography ==
Fascinated by anatomy, he studied medicine and also attended drawing classes at the Academy Charpentier. On 3 July 1966, he discovered sculpture by a friend and sculptor named Enzo Plazota. He said then: “overnight, as soon as I knew the form, I felt that I would give up everything for it.”

On 28 August 1970, he arrived in Carrara, and has since lived in Pietrasanta . A few years later, he created his own foundry and almost exclusively uses bronze for his works.

His creations in continuity to the tradition of Greek sculpture, are a short-circuit between Brancusi's purity, Henry Moore's figurative abstraction and Modigliani's lines and forms.

Considered as the inventor of the "Organic Cubism", he is immediately identifiable while he is reinventing the interpretation of the fullness of flesh through a new and personal mythology.

Pollès and the Boccara gallery work in collaboration since 2014.

== Monumental public works ==
- Argentan : Les jardins de la ville d'Argentan
- Cernay : Vaux-de-Cernay Abbey

== Museums ==
- 1976
  - Museo d'Arte Moderno Milano, Italie.
  - Musée Rodin, Paris, France.
- 1986 – Musee Campredon – L'Isle- sur-la-Sorgue, France.
  - Museum of Arts and Sciences, Daytona Beach, Etats-Unis.
  - Cuban Museum of Art and Culture, collection acquired by the Lowe Art Museum of Miami.
- 1988 – Musée du Grand Palais, Paris, France.
- 1989 – Palais Esterhazy, Vienne, Austria.
- 1991 – Musée de Menton, Palais Carnolès, Menton, France.
- 1994 – Musée Despiau-Mont-de-Marsan, France.
  - Museum of Vero Beach, Vero Beach, United-States.
  - Musée d' Issoire, Issoire, France.
  - Musée de plein air Golf de l'Amirauté : en permanence 4 sculptures, Deauville, France.
- 2014 – Musée Bernard Boesch, Le Pouliguen, France

== Bibliography ==
- 1983 Catherine Ardin / Robert Pimenta, Être Antiquaire, p. 154 – édition Conflit !
- 1986 Jacques Lamalle, L'Empereur de la Faim, p. 178 – édition Flamarion.
- 1991 Palais Carnoles, Pollès, édition du Musée Municipal.
- 1994 Marc Albouy, Du Titanic à Karnak, p. 324 – édition Dunod.
- 1997 Giuliano Serafini, Pollès – Agàlmata, Calendario Polistampa
- 1998 Pascallon, Pollès Centre Culturel d'Issoir
- 2003 Sylvie Blin, Pollès – édition Polistampa, Italie
- 2008 Michel Onfray, La vitesse des simulacres, les sculptures de Pollès, édition Galilée
- 2013 Martine Torrens Frandji, Michel Onfray Le Principe d'Incandescence, p. 254 à p. 261 – édition Grasset
- 2014 Tim Perceval, Parc Samsara, – édition Celestun
