= Robert Maynard Leonard =

English journalist, editor and poet

Robert Maynard Leonard (10 May 1869 – 13 July 1941), sometimes credited as R. Maynard Leonard, was an English journalist, editor, and light poet, the editor of many anthologies of English verse.

== Early life ==
The Leonards were a family of merchants long established in Bristol, dealing in rope and twine, tobacco, iron, paint, and wagons.

Leonard was the son of the Rev. Henry Charles Leonard, Baptist minister of Boxmoor, Hemel Hempstead, Hertfordshire. He was educated at Amersham Hall and University College, Bristol.

== Career ==
After completing his education, Leonard became a journalist and worked for The Pall Mall Gazette, The Westminster Gazette, and other papers. In 1898, he founded the Cold Storage and Ice Association, of which he was Secretary, and also established Cold Storage and Ice Trades Review, of which he was editor. In 1900, on the strength of this, he was elected as an Associate of the Institution of Mechanical Engineers. He was also a member of the Institute of Journalists.

Leonard's anthologies of verse began with The Dog in British Poetry (1893). The popularity of his A Book of Light Verse, published by Henry Frowde in 1910, quickly led on to The Pageant of English Poetry and The Pageant of English Prose for the Oxford University Press, which also commissioned a series of collections of specialist verse under the title Oxford Garlands, published between 1914 and 1915. Many of these works went into several editions.

== Private life ==
In 1898, at Holborn, R. M. Leonard married Amy Fagg. They had two sons, Julian Maynard and Antony Maynard, and a daughter, Ruth Maynard, and settled at The Larches, Purley, Surrey.

After the University of London, Leonard’s son Julian Maynard Leonard (1907–1978) joined and eventually became a partner in Carless, Capel & Leonard, the long-established Bristol oil refinery of his great uncles John Hare Leonard and William Leonard, at one time the leading British oil distillery. In 1893, the company had applied unsuccessfully to trademark the word Petrol. Neither brother had a son, and in 1916 William Leonard was searching for an heir and chose Julian Maynard Leonard.

Antony Maynard Leonard joined the Royal Air Force Volunteer Reserve and in July 1943 was promoted to pilot officer. He was killed in action on the night of 26 November 1943, when his plane was attacked by a German fighter and brought down near Frankfurt.

Leonard died at home, 37, The Pryors, Hampstead, on 13 July 1941, leaving an estate valued at £3,988.

== Anthologies of verse ==
- The Dog in British Poetry (1893, reprinted by Chronicle Books, 2005, ISBN 9780811842464)
- A Book of Light Verse. Edited by R.M. Leonard (London: Henry Frowde, 1910)
- The Pageant of English Poetry: Being 1150 Poems and Extracts by 300 Authors (Oxford University Press, 1911)
- Oxford Garlands: Sonnets selected by R. M. Leonard (Oxford University Press, 1914)
- Oxford Garlands: Patriotic Poems selected by R. M. Leonard (Oxford University Press, 1914)
- Oxford Garlands: Poems on Life selected by R. M. Leonard (Oxford University Press, 1914)
- Oxford Garlands: Love Poems selected by R. M. Leonard (Oxford University Press, 1914)
- Oxford Garlands: Poems on Sport selected by R. M. Leonard (Oxford University Press, 1914)
- Oxford Garlands: Poems on Travel selected by R. M. Leonard (Oxford University Press, 1914)
- Oxford Garlands: Religious Poems selected by R. M. Leonard (Oxford University Press, 1914)
- Oxford Garlands: Epigrams selected by R. M. Leonard (Oxford University Press, 1915)
- Oxford Garlands: Songs for Music selected by R. M. Leonard (Oxford University Press, 1915)
- Modern Lays and Ballads (reprinted 2009)
- Elegies & Epitaphs (reprinted by Leopold Classic Library, 2015 ASIN B00XNNS01C)

== Selected other works ==
- R. M. Leonard, The Book-lover's anthology (H. Frowde : Oxford University Press, 1911)
- A Century of Parody and Imitation, ed. with Walter Jerrold (H. Milford, Oxford University Press, 1913; reprinted by Ulan Press, 2012)
- Robert Maynard Leonard, The War Against Bribery (London: Bribery and Secret Commissions Prevention League, 1913)
- Robert Maynard Leonard, The Patriot's Diary (Oxford University Press, 1915)
- R. M. Leonard, Bribery (Society for Promoting Christian Knowledge, 1919)
- Robert Maynard Leonard, Bribery and Its Prevention in England and Elsewhere (London: Bribery and Secret Commissions Prevention League, 1925)
- Robert Maynard Leonard, The Pageant of English Prose: Being Five Hundred Passages by Three Hundred and Twenty-Five Authors (reprinted by Forgotten Books, 2018 ISBN 978-1331150084)
