= London: A Pilgrimage =

1873 book by William Blanchard Jerrold and Gustave Doré

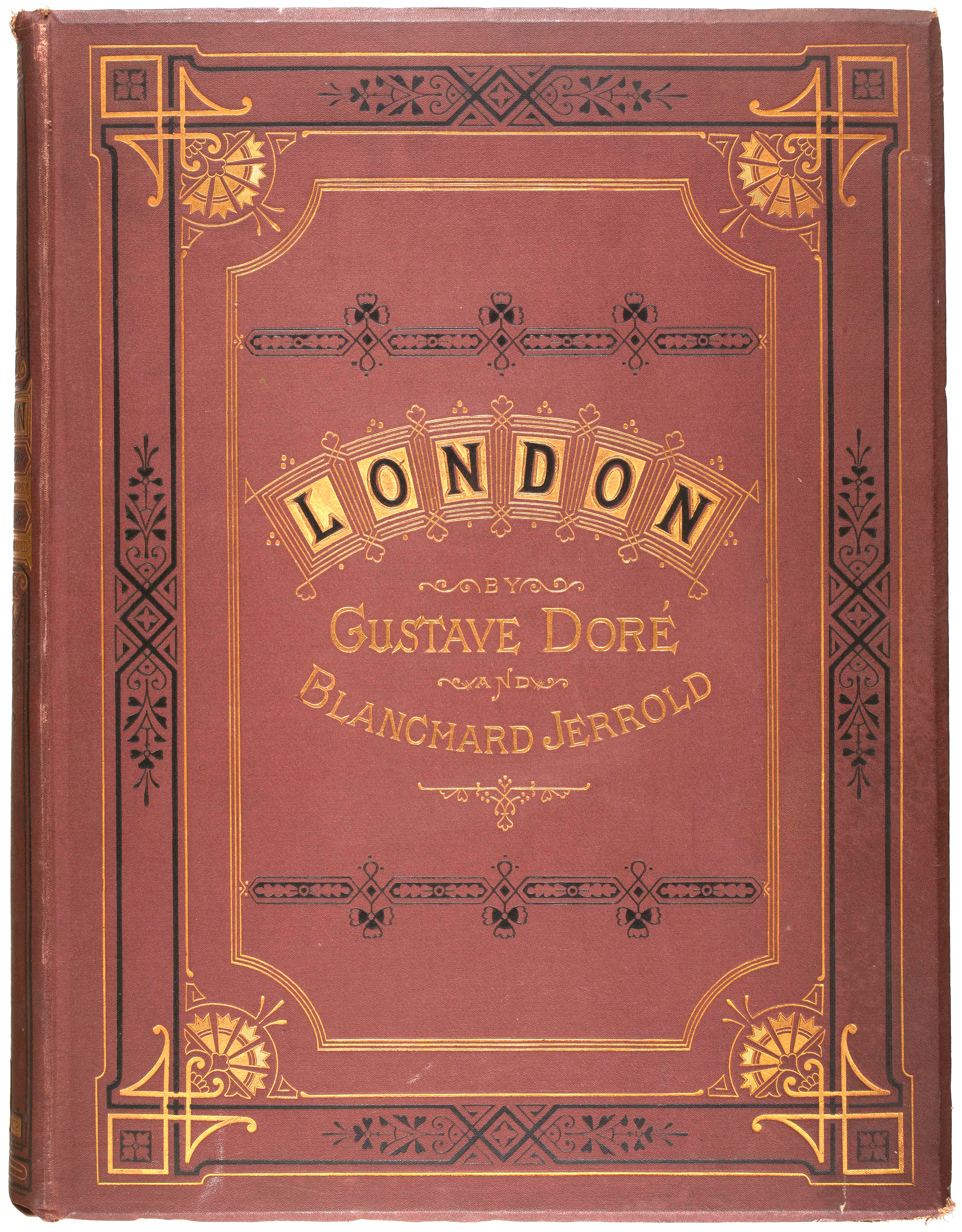
Cover

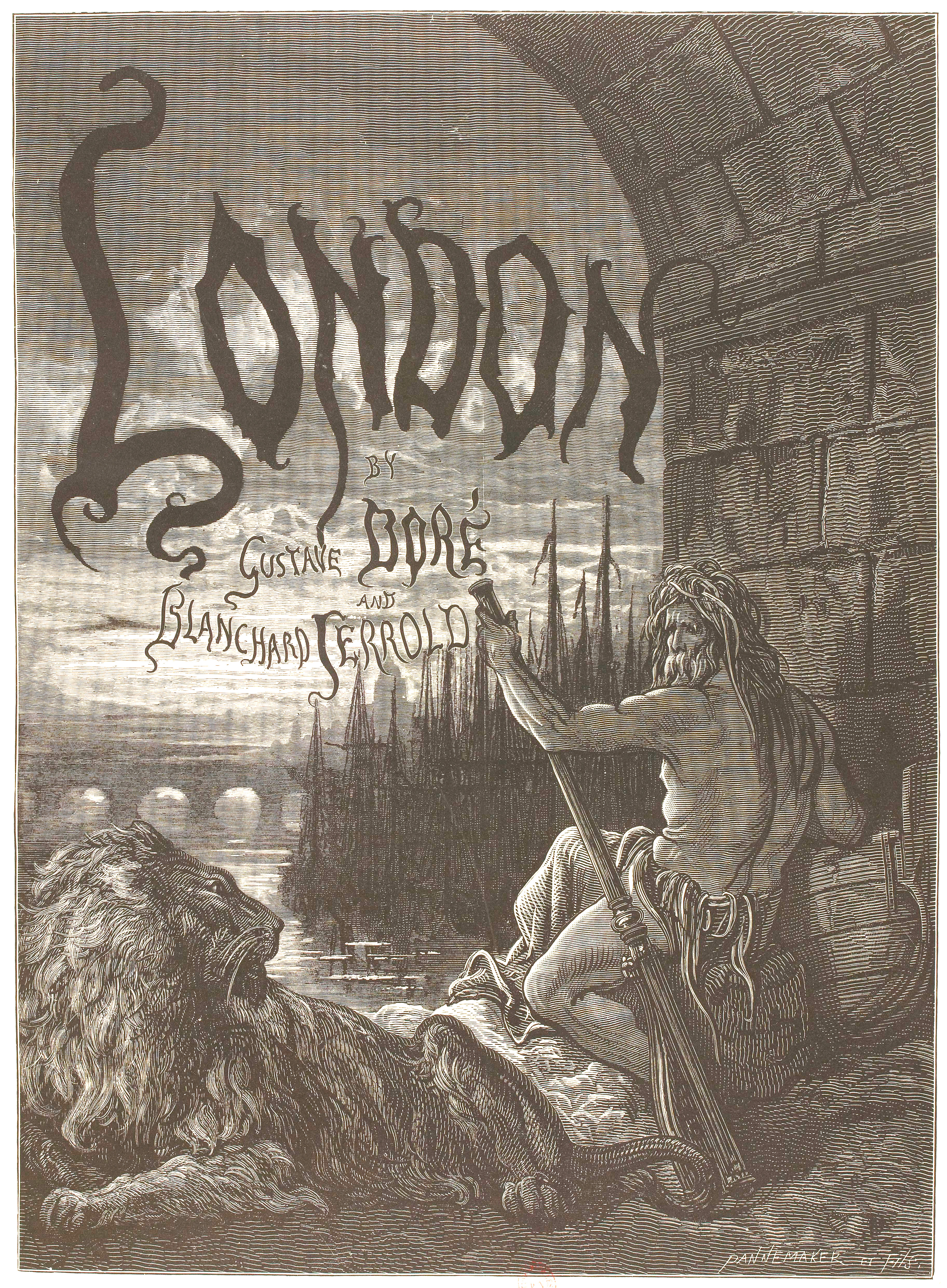
Title page

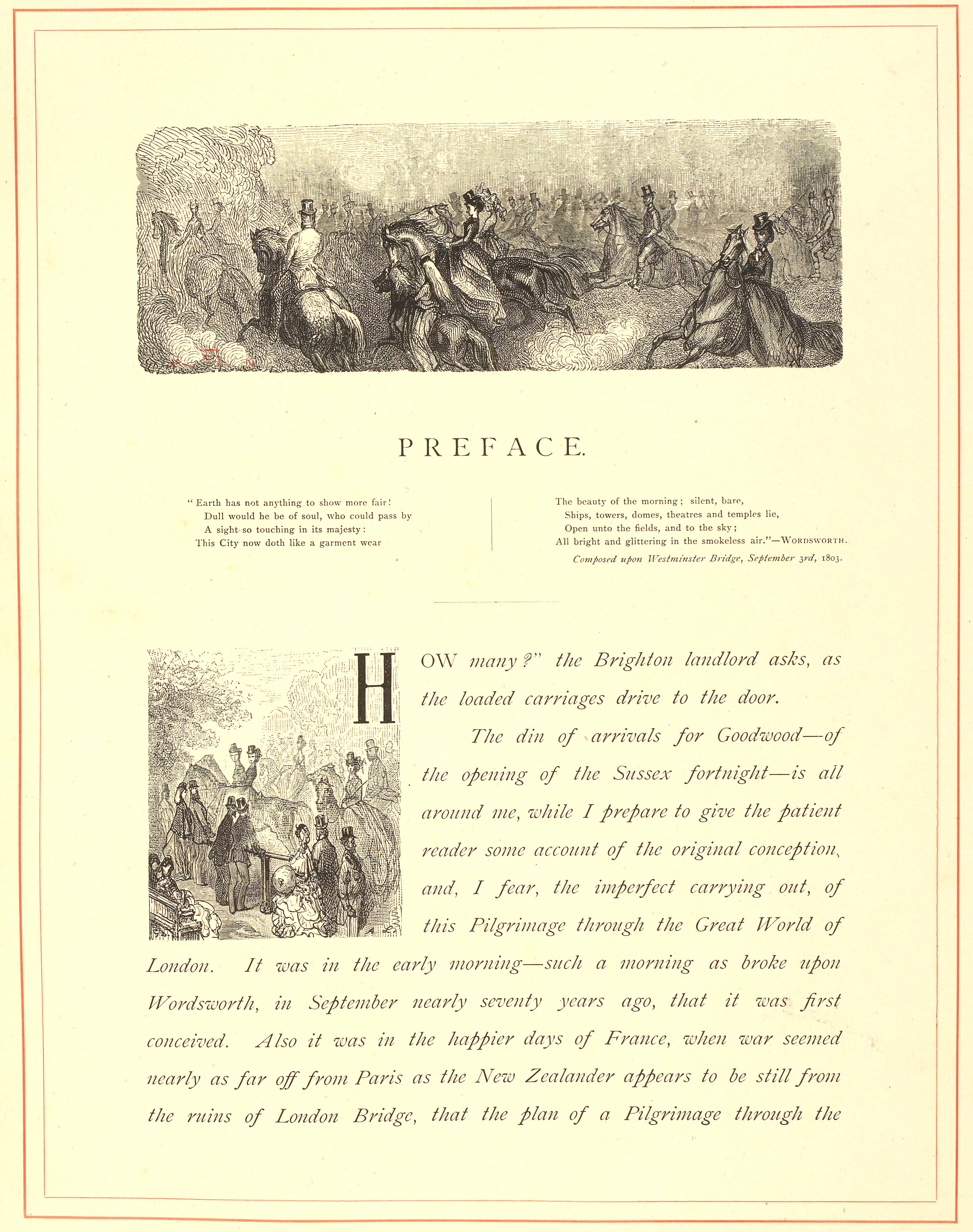
Preface

London: A Pilgrimage is a book first published by Grant & Co in 1872, with text by the English journalist William Blanchard Jerrold and illustrations by the French artist Gustave Doré. It was originally published in 13 parts, with 191 pages and illustrations, and then serialised in Harper's Weekly. It has been described as a populist picture book. Some of Doré's illustrations were later copied by Vincent van Gogh.

Doré's 1866 illustrations for the Bible had been a success, and a Dore Gallery had opened on Bond Street. In 1868, Jerrold proposed the work as a portrait of London, inspired by Thomas Rowlandson's Microcosm of London, and work began in 1869.

Doré was commissioned to create the illustrations by the publisher Grant and Company, receiving an advance of £10,000 for each of the four projected years of work. His contract required the Paris-based artist to visit London for 3 months each year, and make 250 drawings. The author and artist spent days touring the city together, often accompanied by plain clothes policemen. Jerrold led his friend Doré through the "shadows and sunlight of the great world of London". His 250 pen and ink drawings, often with dramatic chiaroscuro, were engraved on wood by a team that included Paul Jonnard (1840–1902).

The title page shows Old Father Thames and a lion beside the river, with a bridge and moored sailing vessels. It starts with a quotation from William Wordsworth's poem "Composed upon Westminster Bridge, September 3, 1802: "Earth has not anything to show more fair!".

Its 21 chapters start with the commercial life on and beside the River Thames with "London Bridge", continue with "The Busy River-Side", "The Docks", and "Above Bridge to Westminster", and the leisure activities with "All London at a Boat Race", and "The Race", moving to Surrey for "The Derby" and "London on the Downs", then back to west London for "The West End" and "In the Season". It continues with "By the Abbey", the green spaces of the Royal Parks in "London, Under Green Leaves", and "With the Beasts" at London Zoo.

It returns to more mundane everyday life in "Work-a-day London", "Humble Industries", and brewing beer in "The Town of Malt"; the Old Bailey gaol at "Under Lock and Key", continuing to the East End of London in "Whitechapel and Thereabouts", the markets including Billingsgate, Covent Garden and "In the Market Places", museums, galleries, theatres and street entertainments of "London at Play", and the orphanages, hospitals and almshouses in "London Charity".

The work was severely criticised when it was published. Doré did not like to sketch in public, so his illustrations have many small errors; and Jerrold's text is light and superficial. It focuses on the deprivation and squalor of the poorest residents of London. It has been considered an early work of social journalism, documenting the high and low society of Victorian London in the mid to late 19th century.
