= William Carpenter (1797–1874) =

British political writer (1797–1874)

William Carpenter (1797 at St James, Westminster, London, England – April 21, 1874, at Islington, London) was a 19th-century theological and political writer, journalist, and editor.

== Early life ==
Carpenter was the son of a London tradesman. He received no formal schooling, but by self-study he learned to read and write, and taught himself several ancient and modern languages. At an early age he began working for a bookseller in Finsbury, first as an errand boy, and then as an apprentice.

== Career ==
While at Finsbury, Carpenter became acquainted with the philologist William Greenfield, editor of Samuel Bagster the Elder's polyglot Bibles, and began co-editing Scripture Magazine, which they eventually expanded into the four-volume work Critica Biblica in 1824–1827. This employment allowed him to devote time to literary pursuits, and he began writing theological and general works, establishing himself as contributor to and editor of numerous periodicals. In 1830 he issued a series of Political Letters with which he attempted to defy the stamp duty on newspapers, but in May 1831 he was tried and convicted of evading the law and was imprisoned. While in prison, he edited a political magazine which was republished as Carpenter's Monthly Political Magazine in 1832. He became intensely involved in the cause of political reform, publishing numerous tracts and books on the subject through the late 1840s. He was a strong proponent of the Chartist movement and a friend of William Cobbett. He was also an active Freemason and contributor to the London Freemason magazine. He continued to publish scriptural works throughout his life, which were also popular in America. His The Israelites Found in the Anglo-Saxons (1874) was an early work on British Israelism. In his elderly years, he suffered from near total loss of sight.

== Major works ==
- Critica Biblica, or, Depositary of Sacred Literature in four volumes (London: William Booth, 1824–1827)
- Scientia biblica: Containing the New Testament, in the original tongue, with the English Vulgate, and a copious and original collection of parallel passages, printed in words at length (London: W. Booth, 1825) Vol. 1, Vol. 2, Vol. 3
- A Popular Introduction to the Study of the Holy Scriptures, for the Use of English Readers (London: Wightman and Cramp, 1826)
- Popular Lectures on Biblical Criticism and Interpretation (London: Thomas Tegg, 1829)
- Anecdotes of the French revolution of 1830 (London, W. Strange, 1830)
- Political Letters and Pamphlets, with a Full Report of the Editor's Trial and Conviction, in the Court of Exchequer, at Westminster (London: William Carpenter, 1830–1831)
- An Address to the Working Classes on the Reform Bill (London: W. Strange, 1831)
- The People's Book; Comprising Their Chartered Rights And Practical Wrongs (London: W. Strange, 1831)
- Scripture Natural History: A Descriptive Account of the Zoology, Botany, and Geology of the Bible (London: Wightman and Cramp, 1828, reprinted at Boston: Lincoln, Edmands & Co., 1833)
- The Political Text Book; Comprising a View of the Origin and Objects of Government, and An Examination of the Principal Social and Political Institutions of England (London: William Strange, 1833)
- The Literary Assistant; A Comprehensive Dictionary of English Synonyms (London: Thomas Tegg and Son, 1833)
- The Biblical Companion, or An Introduction to the Reading and Study of the Holy Scriptures (London: Thomas Tegg and Son, 1836)
- The life and times of John Milton (London: Wakelin, 1836)
- Wesleyana; or a complete system of Wesleyan theology; Selected from the Writings of the Rev. John Wesley, A.M. (New York: T. Mason & G. Lane for the Methodist Episcopal Church, 1840)
- Peerage for the People (London, W. Strange, 1841)
- The Israelites Found in the Anglo-Saxons (London: George Kenning, 1874)
