= Douglas William Jerrold =

English dramatist and writer (1803–1857)

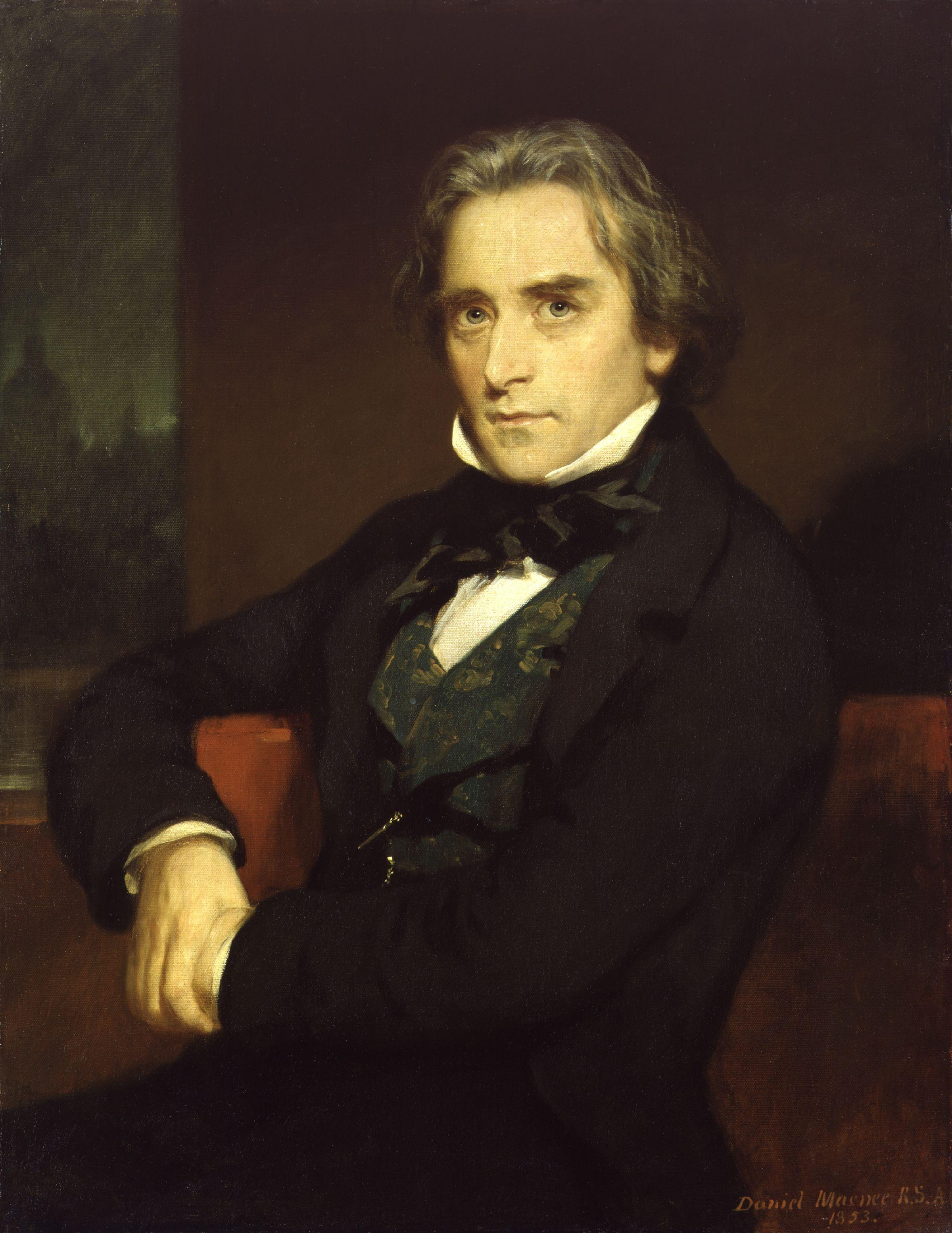
- Douglas William Jerrold
- Born: 3 January 1803; Cranbrook, Kent, England
- Died: 8 June 1857 (aged 54); Kilburn Priory, London, England
- Resting place: West Norwood Cemetery, London
- Spouse: Mary Swan (m. 1824)
- Father: Samuel Jerrold
- Relatives: William Blanchard Jerrold (son); Walter Jerrold (grandson)

Douglas William Jerrold (3 January 1803 – 8 June 1857) was an English dramatist, journalist, and writer, best known for his satirical wit, his socially critical essays, and his association with the early years of Punch magazine. A prominent figure in Victorian literary and theatrical life, he achieved popular success with plays such as Black-Eyed Susan and was noted for his advocacy of social reform through journalism and drama.

== Early life ==
Jerrold's father, Samuel Jerrold, was an actor and lessee of the little theatre of Wilsby near Cranbrook, Kent. In 1807 the family moved to Sheerness, where Jerrold spent his childhood. He occasionally took a child part on the stage, but his father's profession held little attraction for him. In December 1813 he joined the guard ship HMS Namur, where he had Jane Austen's brother Charles Austen as captain, and served as a midshipman until the Treaty of Paris in 1815. He saw nothing of the Napoleonic Wars save a number of wounded soldiers from Waterloo, but he retained an affection for the sea.

The peace of 1815 ruined Jerrold's father; on 1 January 1816 he took his family to London, where Douglas began work as a printer's apprentice, and in 1819 he became a compositor in the printing office of the Sunday Monitor. Several short papers and copies of verses by him had already appeared in the sixpenny magazines, and a criticism of the opera Der Freischütz was admired by the editor, who requested further contributions. Thus Jerrold became a professional journalist.

== Theatre ==
In 1821, a comedy that Jerrold had written at age 14 was brought out at Sadler's Wells Theatre under the title More Frightened than Hurt. Other plays followed, and in 1825 he was employed for a few pounds weekly to produce dramas and farces to order for George Bolwell Davidge of the Coburg Theatre. In the autumn of 1824, the "little Shakespeare in a camlet cloak", as he was nicknamed, married Mary Swan and continued to work as both dramatist and journalist. For a short while he was part proprietor of a small Sunday newspaper. In 1829, through a quarrel with the exacting Davidge, Jerrold left for Coburg.

In 1829, a three-act melodrama about corrupt personnel and press gangs of the Navy launched his fame. Black-Eyed Susan; or, All in the Downs, was brought out by manager Robert William Elliston at the Surrey Theatre. Britain at the time was recovering from the fallout of the Napoleonic Wars and was in the midst of a class war involving the Corn Laws and a reform movement which resulted in the Reform Act 1832 aimed at reducing corruption. Black-Eyed Susan consisted of various extreme stereotypes representing the forces of good, evil, the innocent and the corrupt, the poor and the rich, woven into a serious plot with comic sub-plots to keep the audience entertained. Its subject was very topical, and its success was enormous. The play was a success, and Elliston made a fortune from it; T. P. Cooke, who played William, made his reputation; Jerrold received about £60 and was engaged as dramatic author at five pounds per week, but his reputation as a dramatist was established.

In 1830, Mutiny on the Nore or British Sailors in 1897, a play (nautical drama) in three acts about the 1797 Navy mutinies was first performed at the Pavilion Theatre 7 June 1830 with Thomas Cobham (actor) as Parker, and Royal Coburg Theatre 23 August 1830, and Tottenham Street Theatre 1830.

It was proposed in 1830 that he should adapt something from the French language for Drury Lane. He declined, preferring to produce original work. The Bride of Ludgate (8 December 1832) was the first of several of his plays produced at Drury Lane. The other patent houses also threw their doors open to him (the Adelphi had already done so), and in 1836 Jerrold became the manager of the Strand Theatre with W. J. Hammond, his brother-in-law. The venture was not successful, and the partnership was dissolved. While it lasted, Jerrold wrote his only tragedy, The Painter of Ghent, and he appeared in the title role, without much success.

Jerrold acted in the 1851 production of Not So Bad As We Seem, a play written by Edward Bulwer, starring many notable Victorians (including Charles Dickens) and attended by Queen Victoria. He continued to write sparkling comedies until 1854, the date of his last piece, The Heart of Gold.

== Journalism ==
Jerrold wrote for numerous periodicals and gradually became a contributor to the Monthly Magazine, Blackwood's, the New Monthly, and The Athenaeum. To Punch, the publication which of all others is associated with his name, he contributed from its second number in 1841 until within a few days of his death. Punch was a humorous and liberal publication. Jerrold's liberal and radical perspective was portrayed in the magazine under the pseudonym 'Q', which used satire to attack institutions of the day. Punch was also the forum in which he published in the 1840s his comic series Mrs Caudle's Curtain Lectures, which was later published in book form.

He contributed many articles for Punch under different pseudonyms. On 13 July 1850 he wrote as 'Mrs Amelia Mouser' about the forthcoming Great Exhibition of 1851, coining the phrase the palace of very crystal. From that day forward, The Crystal Palace, at that time still a proposal from his friend Joseph Paxton, gained the name from which it would henceforth be known.

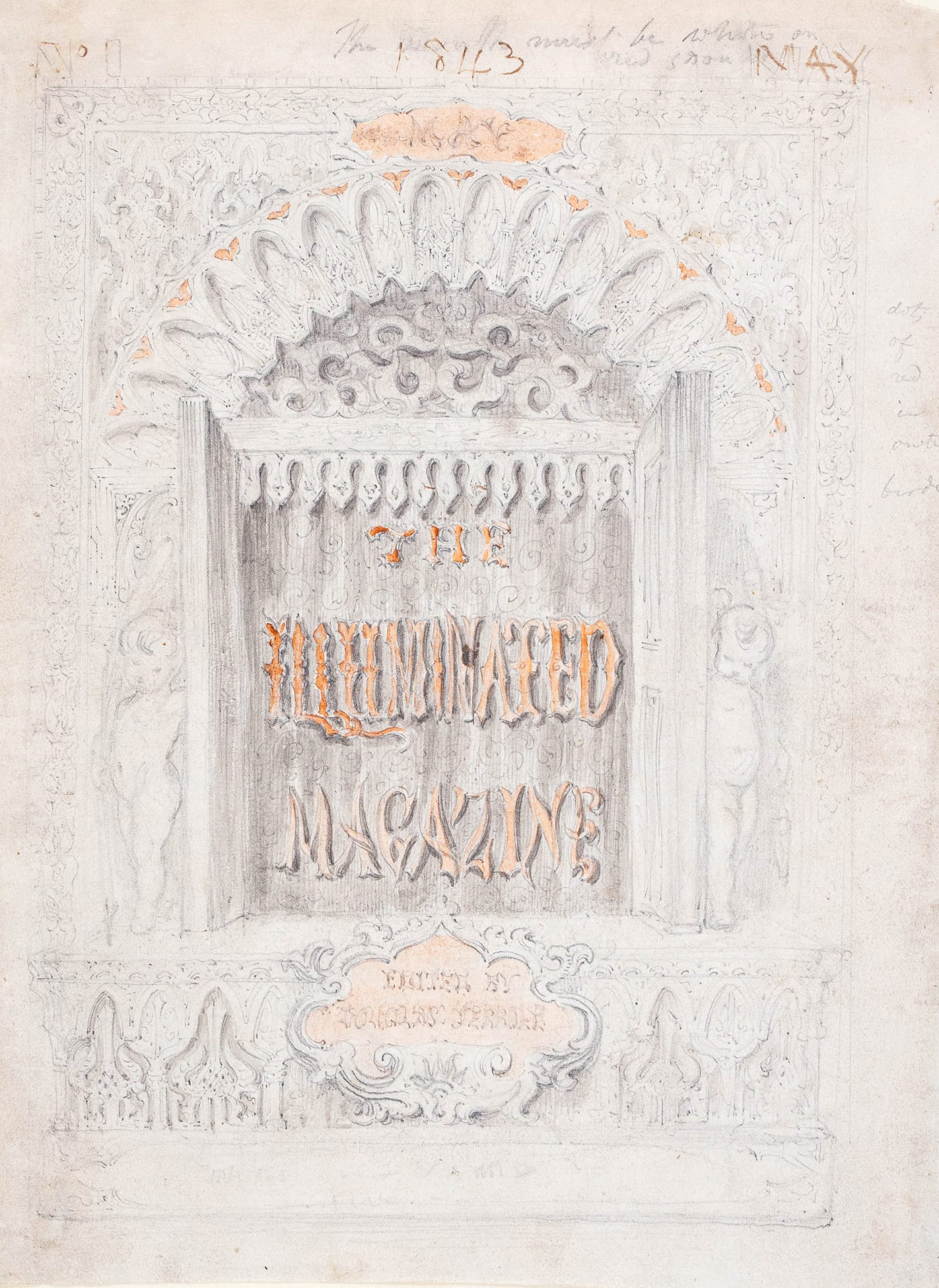
Ebenezer Landells's artwork for the first, May 1843, issue of The Illuminated Magazine

He founded and edited for some time, with indifferent success, the Illuminated Magazine, Jerrold's Shilling Magazine, and Douglas Jerrold's Weekly Newspaper; and under his editorship from 1852, Lloyd's Weekly Newspaper rose from almost nonentity to a circulation of 182,000. The history of his later years is little more than a catalogue of his literary productions, interrupted now and again by brief visits to the Continent or to the country.

== Death and legacy ==
Douglas Jerrold died at his house, Kilburn Priory, in London on 8 June 1857 and was buried at West Norwood Cemetery, where Charles Dickens was a pall-bearer. Dickens gave a public reading and performances of the drama The Frozen Deep to raise money for his widow. The first article of the first issue of the Atlantic Monthly (November 1857) is a lengthy obituary for Jerrold.

Jerrold's figure was small and spare, and in later years he was bowed almost to deformity. His features were strongly marked and expressive, from the thin humorous lips to the keen blue eyes, gleaming from beneath the shaggy eyebrows. He was brisk and active, with the careless bluffness of a sailor. Open and sincere, he concealed neither his anger nor his pleasure; to his sailor's frankness all polite duplicity was distasteful. The cynical side of his nature he kept for his writings; in private life his hand was always open. In politics Jerrold was a Liberal, and he gave eager sympathy to Lajos Kossuth, Giuseppe Mazzini and Louis Blanc. In social politics especially he took an eager part; he never tired of declaiming against the horrors of war, the luxury of bishops, or the iniquity of capital punishment.

Jerrold is now perhaps better known from his reputation as a brilliant wit in conversation than from his writings. As a dramatist he was very popular, though his plays have not kept the stage. He dealt with rather humbler forms of social world than had commonly been represented on the boards. He was one of the first and certainly one of the most successful of the men who in defence of the native English drama endeavoured to stem the tide of translation from the French, which threatened early in the 19th century to drown original native talent. His skill in construction and his mastery of epigram and brilliant dialogue are well exemplified in his comedy, Time Works Wonders (Haymarket, 26 April 1845). The tales and sketches which form the bulk of Jerrold's collected works vary much in skill and interest; but, although there are evident traces of their having been composed from week to week, they are always marked by keen satirical observation and pungent wit.

In 1859 his eldest son William Blanchard Jerrold wrote Life and Remains of Douglas Jerrold (1859). His son also edited The Wit and Opinions of Douglas Jerrold (1858), and The Works of Douglas Jerrold, with a memoir by his son, W. B. Jerrold, in 1863–64, which was never completed. Among the numerous selections from his tales and witticisms are two edited by his grandson, Walter Jerrold, Bons Mots of Charles Lamb and Douglas Jerrold (1904), and The Essays of Douglas Jerrold (1903), illustrated by H. M. Brock.

Jerrold was the great-grandfather of Audrey Mayhew Allen (b. 1870), author of children's stories published in various periodicals and of Gladys in Grammarland, an imitation of Lewis Carroll's Alice in Wonderland books.

== Works ==
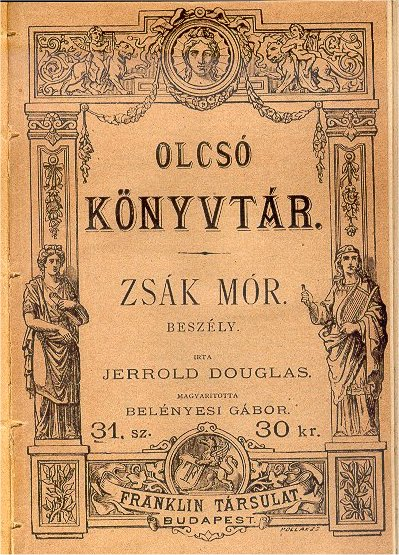
Zsák Mór (Hungarian edition, 1877)

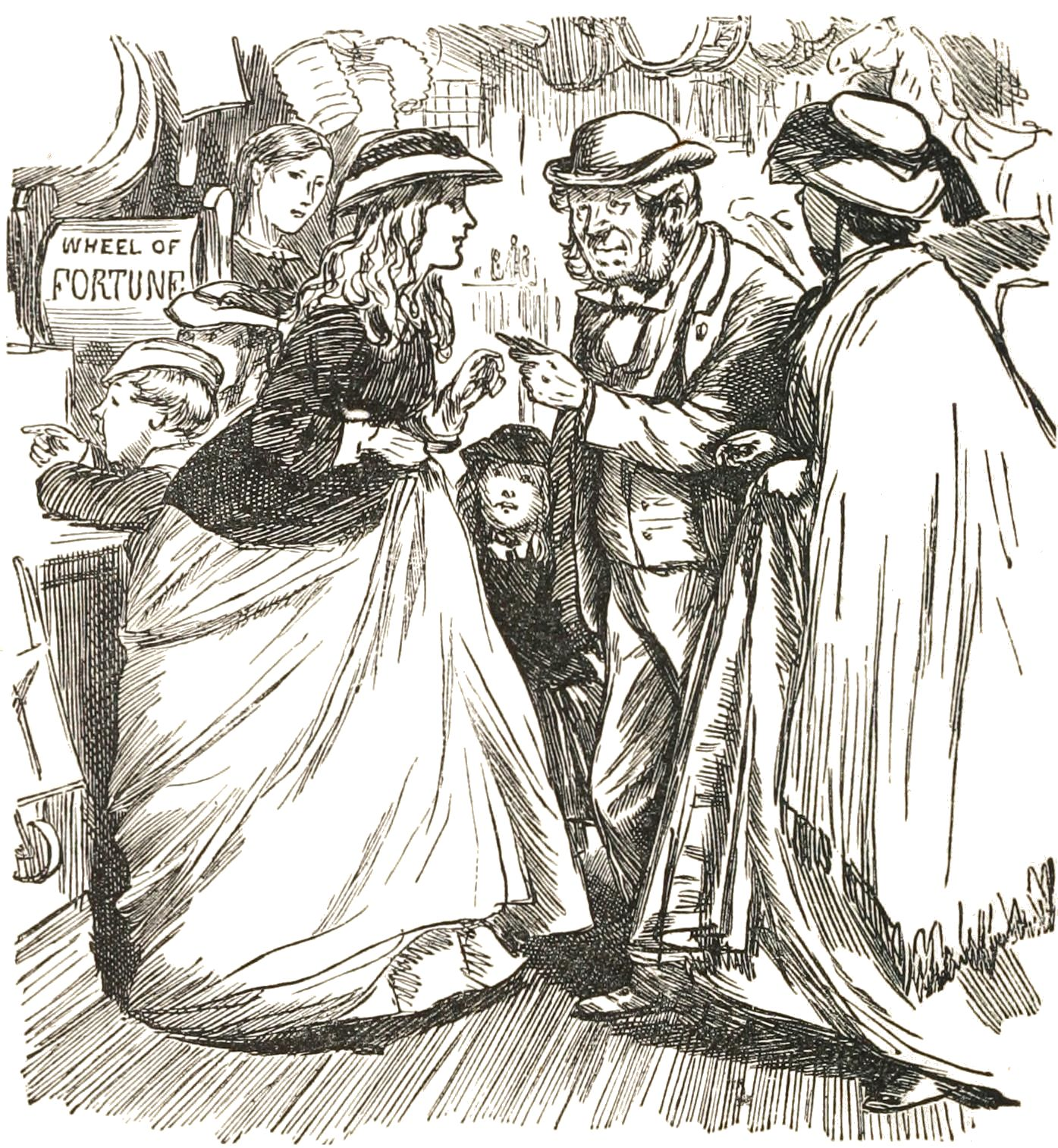
Lecture 27, Mrs. Caudle's curtain lectures

The best known of his numerous works include:

- Black-Eyed Susan (1829) play/melodrama
- The Mutiny At The Nore (1830) play/melodrama
- The Rent Day (1832) play/melodrama
- Men of Character (1838), including "Job Pippin: The man who couldn't help it", and other sketches of the same kind
- Cakes and Ale (2 vols., 1842), a collection of short papers and whimsical stories
- The Story of a Feather (1844) novel
- The Chronicles of Clovernook (1846) novel
- A Man made of Money (1849) novel
- The Catspaw (1850) play
- St Giles and St James (1851) novel
- Various series of papers reprinted from Punch's Letters to his Son (1843)
- Punch's Complete Letter-writer (1845)
- Mrs Caudle's Curtain Lectures (1846)
- A collected edition of his writings appeared between 1851 and 1854.

== Notes and references ==
Media offices
| Preceded by Edward Lloyd | Editor of Lloyd's Weekly Newspaper; 1852–1857 | Succeeded by William Blanchard Jerrold |
