= Alexandre Bernheim =

French photographer and art collector

Alexandre Bernheim (4 April 1839 - 2 March 1915) was a French art dealer, photographer and optician.

== Life ==
He was born in Besançon to colour merchant Joseph Bernheim (1799–1859) and Madeleine Mayer. He set up a photography studio in Brussels.

On the advice of his friend Gustave Courbet he moved himself and his family to Paris and set up a new studio on its rue Neuve as well as in 1863 opening the Galerie Bernheim-Jeune at 8 rue Laffitte. In 1901 the first retrospective of Vincent van Gogh was held in that gallery and Bernheim took part in the sale of Courbet's L'Origine du monde in 1913. His sons assisted in running the gallery.

He married Henriette Adler and had:

- Marguerite - married Jack Aghion in 1892
- Gabrielle - married Félix Vallotton in 1899
- Joseph (1870–1941), married one of the Adler sisters on the same day as his brother married the other in 1901
- Gaston (1870–1953)

Bernheim died two years later at his home on avenue Hoche in Paris. His tomb is in the Cimetière du Montparnasse.
