= Master and Man =

Master and Man may refer to:

- "Master and Man" (short story), an 1895 short story by Leo Tolstoy
- Master and Man (play), a Victorian play by George R. Sims
- Master and Man (1915 film), a silent British film adaptation, directed by Percy Nash
- Master and Man (1929 film), a silent British film adaptation
- Master and Man (1934 film), a British film adaptation
