= May Yohé =

American actress (1866–1938)

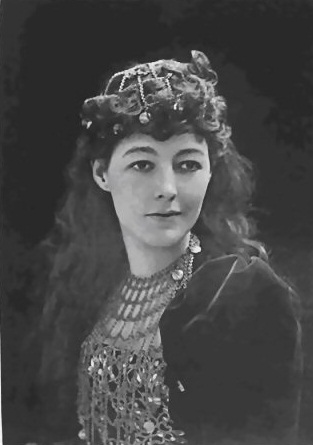
- Yohé in The Era Almanack, 1894
- Born: Mary Augusta Yohé; April 6, 1866; Bethlehem, Pennsylvania, US
- Died: August 29, 1938 (aged 72); Boston, Massachusetts, US
- Occupation: Musical actress
- Spouse(s): Lord Francis Hope; Putnam Bradlee Strong; John A. Smuts

Mary Augusta "May" Yohé (April 6, 1866 (Note: Her birth year is often given as 1869, but public records show that she was actually born in 1866.) – August 29, 1938) was an American musical theatre actress. She began her career in 1886 with the McCaull Comic Opera Company in New York and Chicago. After other performances in the United States, she quickly gained success on the London stage, beginning in 1893. There she created the title role in the hit show Little Christopher Columbus in 1894.

The same year, she married Lord Francis Hope, the owner of the Hope Diamond. After the wedding, she continued to perform in musical theatre in London's West End and then the U.S. After squandering their wealth, the two divorced in 1902, and she later married a series of other financially unsuccessful, but often adventurous, men. In the early 20th century, she performed in music hall and vaudeville on the West Coast and elsewhere in the U.S., but she was frequently in financial jeopardy. By 1924, she and her last husband, John Smuts, had settled in Boston, where she died in near poverty.

== Early years ==
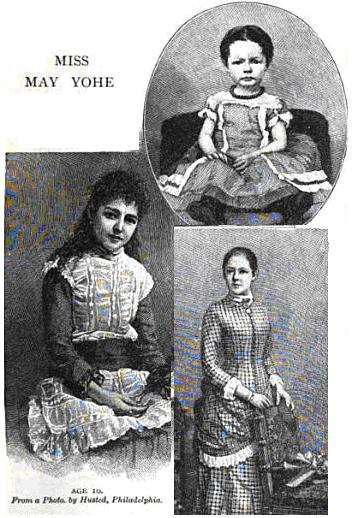
Childhood photographs - The Strand Magazine, 1895

Yohé was born in Bethlehem, Pennsylvania, the daughter of William W. and Elizabeth (nee Batcheller) Yohé. Her father, an American Civil War veteran, was either the son or nephew of Caleb Yohé, proprietor of the Eagle Hotel, where she was born. William Yohé inherited the hotel and was locally famous for the elaborate miniature village scenes he constructed on the hotel grounds, especially for his annual Christmas putz. Yohé's mother, a descendant of the Narragansett people, was a talented dressmaker. According to Yohé, her mother had a clientele in Philadelphia that included many famous theater people. As a young girl, Yohé entertained the hotel's guests by dancing and singing in the lobby and recounting childhood stories. What became of her father is unclear: in 1878, he applied for a U.S. passport, planning to travel to Brazil. According to family lore, he died in Colorado or Montana around 1885. At around the age of ten, Yohé was sent to Europe for a refined education, studying in Dresden and later at the Convent of the Sacré Coeur in Paris.

== Career ==
Yohé began her career as a soprano, but within a short while her voice lowered into a contralto that was described as peculiar. She debuted as May Yohé (May derived from her initials) in January 1886 with the McCaull Comic Opera Company as Dilly Dimple in The Little Tycoon, a comic opera by Willard Spencer, presented at Temple Theatre in Philadelphia and in March of that year at the Standard Theatre in New York. In March 1887, she appeared in McCaull's Broadway production of Lorraine, composed by Rudolph Dellinger to a libretto by Oscar Walther, which was adapted in English by William J. Henderson. She then played in the same production at the Chicago Opera House. In that production, she sang the following song with much success:

Every Flower that Blooms so Fair
Every Birdlet that Beats the Air
Has Heard of thy Beauty Rare
Thy Beauty Beyond Compare

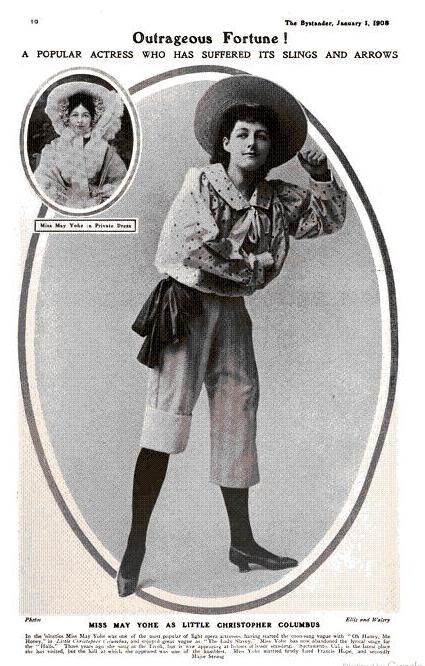
Little Christopher Columbus, c. 1894 (The Bystander, 1908)

The song remained popular in the Chicago area for several years. Later in 1887, with McCaull at the Chicago Opera House, she sang "Bid Me Good-By and Go" in the musical comedy Natural Gas by Henry Grattan Donnelly. Yohé's unique vocal quality attracted the attention of the manager of the Chicago Opera House, and she was engaged to play princess Zal-Am-Boo in Alfred Thompson's extravaganza Arabian Nights, which premiered on June 2, 1887. The following year, she appeared in The Crystal Slipper: or Prince Pretliwittz and Little Cinderella, also at the Chicago Opera House. In 1888, on the weekend that preceded the Fourth of July, Yohé travelled to Cleveland, Ohio in the company of Edward Shaw, the son of W. W. Shaw, a major stockholder in the Chicago Opera House. She missed at least two performances before returning. Shaw's young wife filed for divorce a week later. She subsequently toured in America and abroad with George Lederer's Players in the farce comedy U & I and as Celia Cliquot in Hoss and Hoss, both in 1891.

In 1893, Yohé made her London debut as Martina in The Magic Opal by Isaac Albéniz, and the following year she played the title character in the musical The Lady Slavey, composed by Gustave Adolph Kerker, with a book by Sir George Dance, in which she sang "What's a Poor Girl to Do". She starred as the title character in the 1894 hit burlesque Little Christopher Columbus, "a great personal success" for her. In an interview, Yohé said the music, "had to be specially written for me – crammed so to speak, into my voice's shrunken circumference." While in London, she became a favorite of the Prince of Wales (later King Edward VII). The next year she played the title role in the comic opera Dandy Dick Whittington, at the Avenue Theatre, written by George Robert Sims and composed by Ivan Caryll. Sims noted that Yohé "could be rude [to writers, composers and conductors] if she didn't get just what she wanted."

In 1896, Yohé played the title role in the musical The Belle of Cairo at the Royal Court Theatre in London. She later returned twice to Broadway. There she was Lady Muriel Despair in the musical The Giddy Throng (1900–01) and appeared in the brief revival of the revue Mamzelle Champagne in 1906. That same year at the Knickerbocker Theatre in New York, Yohé appeared in Mlle. Nitouche, a piece that she had produced a decade or so earlier at the Royal Court Theatre and at the Duke of York's Theatre (then the Trafalgar Square Theatre) in London.

== Marriages: 1893–1908 ==
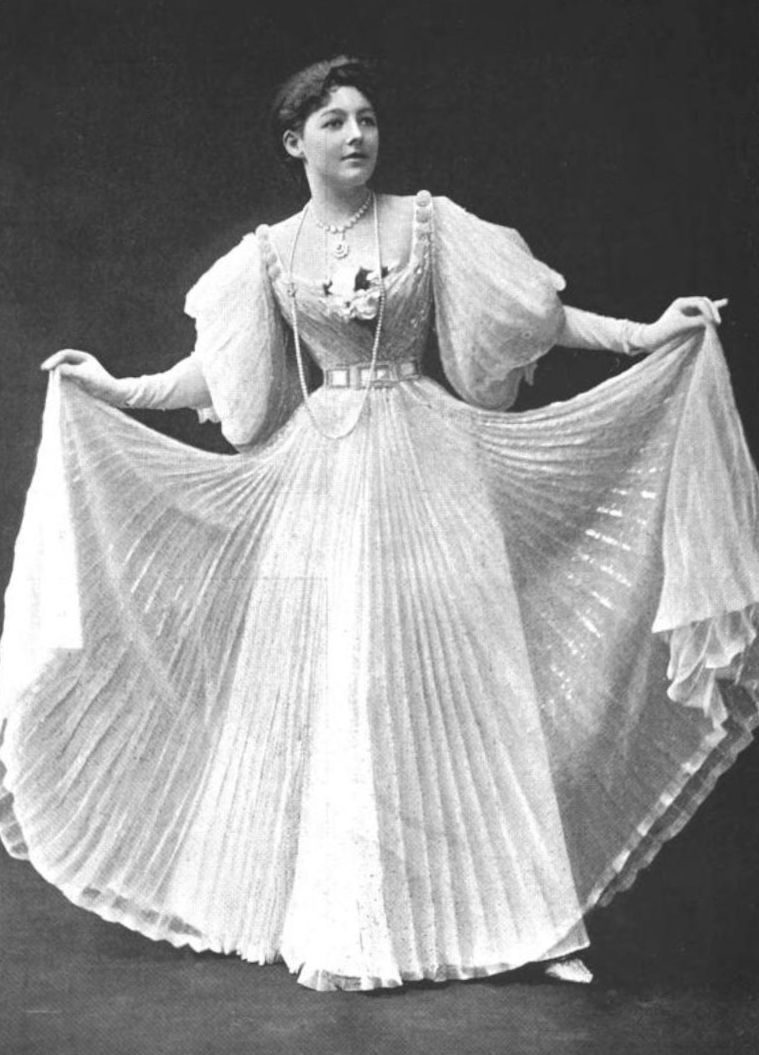
Yohé in her wedding dress in The Sketch, November 28, 1894

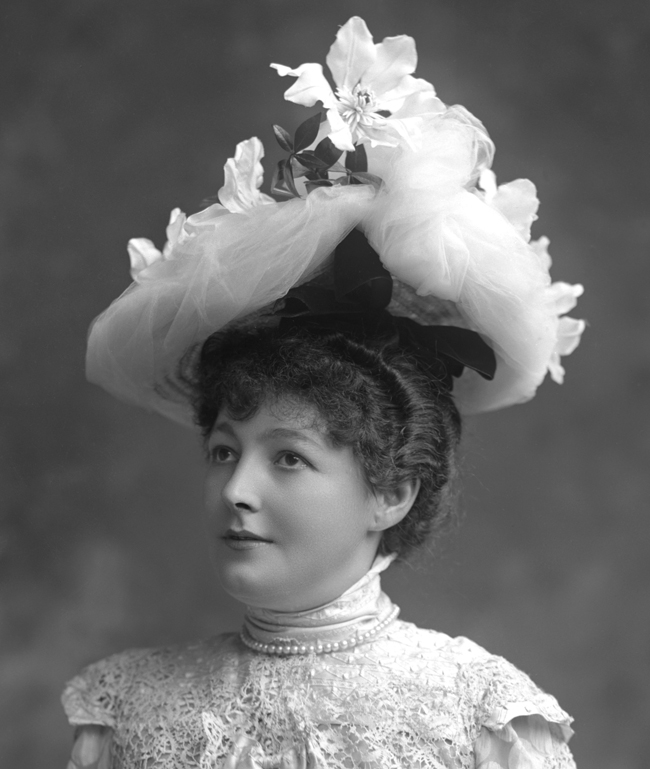
Yohé, 1899

Yohé had three marriages, beginning in 1893. The following is transcribed from a 1908 article in Bystander magazine:

...Miss May Yohé, ex-musical-comedy star and ex-duchess-presumptive, is, to earn her daily bread, reduced almost to the lowest depths. She is now giving nightly a song and dance turn in a cheap music hall in Sacramento, California. In the early 'nineties, rather pretty, beautifully made, and possessed of two most valuable assets, a fine voice and unlimited assurance, May Yohé came to London, and in a very short time had won front place in a musical-comedy chorus. In Little Christopher Columbus her singing of "Oh, honey, ma honey," took the town by storm, and brought to her feet one of the greatest parlis [sic] of the day, Lord Francis Hope, brother and heir of the Duke of Newcastle, the owner of a vast, but already half-dissipated fortune, and of Deepdene (an English estate).

=== Love, marriage, and divorce ===
Their marriage took place quietly at a suburban registry office in [November] 1894. Already Lord Francis had been a bankrupt, but a year after the marriage his remaining wealth, his lands, the famous Hope Diamond, and all his pictures and heirlooms were frittered away by the combined efforts of the young couple. Pecuniary troubles, however, embarrassed the two but slightly. A future Duke and Duchess can always beg or borrow, and they did. In 1900 they made a tour of the world, and on their way home fell in with Captain [Putnam] Bradlee Strong, (Note: Strong was the son of New York City Mayor William Lafayette Strong (1895–1897).) at that time one of the handsomest and most popular men in the United States Army, and a special favorite with President McKinley. The actress fell head over ears in love with him. She refused to return to England with Lord Francis, and, after he had divorced her [in 1902], married the Captain in San Francisco.

=== The second marriage ===
The second marriage turned out even more disastrously than the first. The pair quarreled from the beginning, and there was never any money. The woman had renounced the certainty of becoming a duchess for the man, and the man had renounced family, fame, and friends for the woman. Only a very great and very unselfish love could have survived all that, and theirs was neither. In 1902, Mrs. Strong announced to the newspapers that her husband had decamped with £20,000 worth of her jewelry. A few days later, Captain Strong arrived in London, heard with surprise, and denied with disgust, his wife's preposterous story. She followed him to London, and a sort of reconciliation was effected.

=== The return to the stage? ===
On their return to America the two went on the music-hall stage together. But May Yohé's star had long since waned, the public taste had altered, and the gallant Captain was not a histrionic genius. Very soon he, too, became bankrupt, and in 1905 sued for, and obtained, a divorce from the woman who had caused his downfall. For a time May Yohé was forgotten, but a year ago it was announced that she had married Mr. Newton Brown, a friend of her childhood, and described by his bride as "still the same lovely boy."

Contemporaneous New York Times articles, while presenting facts that vary in some details from this account, confirm most of the facts in this article. One notes that Hope settled claims against him by Yohé for $5,000.

== Hope and Strong ==
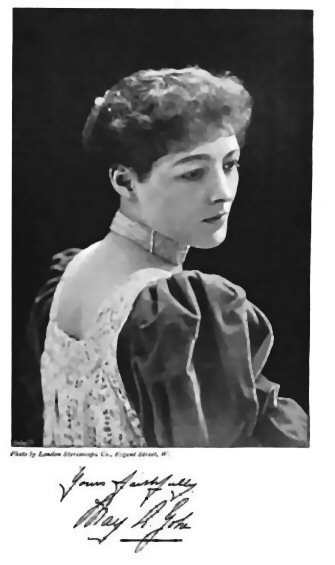
Yohé in On and Off 1894

According to Yohé, she was introduced to Francis Hope at Delmonico's Restaurant in New York before she came to England in the early 1890s. The couple was often seen together at fashionable night spots around London. On March 30, 1894, Burke's Peerage announced their wedding. The wedding took place on November 27, 1893, at Hampstead Parrish in London. Press reports at the time claimed Hope's family offered him around £200,000 to call off the engagement. In June 1894, The New York Times reported that Hope had filed for bankruptcy with liabilities amounting to £405,277 and assets of £194,042. At the time of her marriage to Hope, there had been reports in the press implying she had been married twice before: first, in San Francisco to the son of a General Williams, and next in Massachusetts to a local politician.

Yohé met Strong early in 1901 on the last leg of her world trip with Hope. In July of that year, Strong, who had served as Assistant Adjutant General in the Philippines, resigned his commission once it was reported in the press that he had been asked to leave by the manager of the California Hotel in San Francisco where the couple registered as H. L. Hastings and wife. Later the two sailed to Japan, where they lived for several months in Yokohama. The following year, Hope lost a foot to a hunting accident, divorced his wife and again declared bankruptcy. Even though Major Strong had resigned his commission some months earlier, the War Department in Washington D.C. announced on March 22, 1902, the same day of Yohé's divorce, his nomination for promotion to lieutenant colonel by brevet for his service in the Philippines.

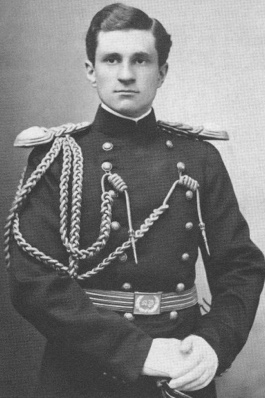
Putnam Bradlee Strong

In April 1902, they returned to America to live with Yohé's mother at her residence in Hastings-on-Hudson. Three months later, Yohé accused Strong of running off with her jewelry worth many thousands of dollars. With the financial assistance of Strong's family, Yohé later reconciled with "Putty" while both were in Europe. A few months later, once her divorce decree from Hope was made absolute, they married in Buenos Ayres on October 3, 1902. Strong later joined his wife on the vaudeville stage. In 1905 he declared bankruptcy, even though he and his wife were making $750 a week as entertainers. That December, Yohé filed for divorce, claiming desertion. Strong, who reportedly was living in Macau after their divorce, died in New York in 1945 at the age of 70. In 1913 the press reported that Yohé and Francis Hope were reconciling. Hope declared the story to be preposterous.

== Brief relationships ==
Yohé's third husband, Newton Brown, was a New York journalist with theater connections; they married in April 1907. Their union was short-lived, for in May 1909 a San Francisco newspaper reported that Yohé had given up for adoption a baby boy she had with a new husband, a British Columbia miner by the name of Murphy. The child was reportedly born in September 1908, in Portland, Oregon, where Yohé had been living in seclusion. In May of the following year the boy was adopted by Edward R. Thomas, owner of the Perkins Hotel Pharmacy, and his wife Rosa. The adoption consent was signed "Mary A. Strong". In the mid-1930s, an actor named Robert Thomas, the adopted son of Edward and Rosa, tried in vain to prove that his birth father was Putnam Bradlee Strong. Yohé adamantly rejected his claim not only that Strong was his father, but that she was his mother. Had Thomas been successful, he would have been eligible for a share in a large trust fund set up by Strong's mother.

About 1910, Yohé purchased a run-down boarding house in Seattle, Washington, which she ran for a few months before she married musician Frank M. Reynolds in Seattle. Reynolds was the son of an Upstate New York college professor, who soon claimed he had received a letter from his son refuting the story. In September 1911, Yohé denied she planned to wed former lightweight champion boxer Jack McAuliffe, who at the time was her partner at a 10¢ movie house in New York performing vaudeville skits between movie screenings. The following month, however, Yohé was reported to be in Chicago living "in dire penury, almost starvation" with her husband McAuliffe.

== Captain John Smuts ==
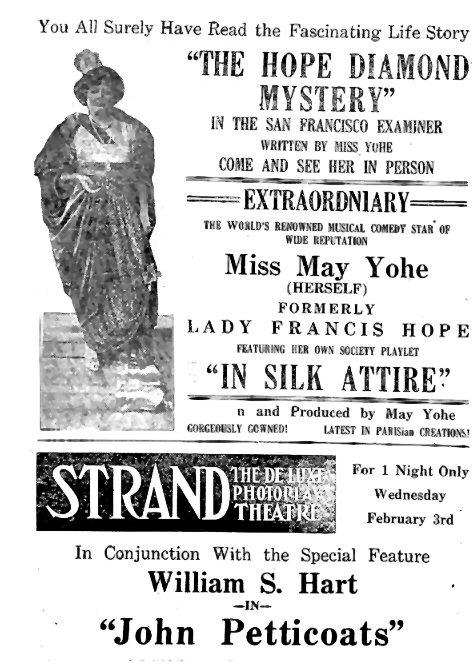
Advertisement for In Silk Attire, 1921

Around 1914, in London or possibly South Africa, May Yohé married Captain John Addey Smuts, a South African-born retired British army officer and cousin of general Jan Smuts. Over the early years of their marriage, the two traveled to Singapore, India, China and Japan, eventually settling in South Africa. In the waning months of the First World War, it was reported that Yohé planned to accompany her husband to France, where he intended to serve on the front lines while she would serve as a Red Cross nurse. Smuts was unable to secure a military commission, and within a few months the two moved to Seattle, Washington, where Smuts found shipyard work. Soon after, he contracted influenza, leaving Yohé to seek employment as a housekeeper at the apartment house where they were living. In 1919, Yohé, was back in vaudeville, meeting with modest success.

In the early 1920s, after auctioning off some valuable possessions and returning from a South American trip, Yohé and her husband toured the vaudeville circuit in the U.S. with an act based on the less-than-successful 1921 movie serial The Hope Diamond Mystery, which she helped write and promote. Later they invested in a California ranch. This venture failed and they soon returned to vaudeville, though this time with less success. They lost the remainder of their savings in a failed farming venture in New Hampshire. By 1924, the couple had settled in Boston, where John Smuts found work as a janitor. In November 1924, Capt Smuts was shot in the chest at their Boston residence. The wound was not serious and he soon recovered. Smuts maintained that he was cleaning a gun when it accidentally discharged. He refused to explain to the investigators the mysterious suicide note they recovered, written in two different handwriting styles.

== Death ==
In 1938, Yohé applied for a $16.50-a-week clerical job with the Works Progress Administration (WPA) in Boston. Her husband's health was failing, and she needed the income for his care. Yohé was turned down because she had given up her U.S. citizenship in the 1890s when she married Francis Hope. She applied to regain her citizenship and several weeks later, in May 1938, was given the job she had applied for. Not long afterward, on August 29, 1938, she died in Boston of heart and kidney disease. Three thousand people attended her service, including Robert Thomas. At the time of her death, Yohé's most prized possession was a large photograph of Edward VII, taken while he was still the Prince of Wales, and signed "To May, 1898". A few days after her funeral, John Smuts followed his wife's final wish and sprinkled her ashes into the Atlantic Ocean. He died in Boston of a heart attack a few months later, on January 11, 1939.

The Hartford Courant, in their obituary, quoted Yohé as follows: "I've done pretty nearly everything in my life, except theft and murder, but thank God, whatever I've done my heart's been in it."

== See also ==
- List of entertainers who married titled Britons

== Sources ==
- Adams, William Davenport. A Dictionary of the Drama: a Guide to the Plays, Playwrights, Vol. 1, Chatto & Windus, 1904
- Gates, Henry Leyford. The Mystery of the Hope Diamond, 1921
