= Christmas Day in the Workhouse =

1877 monologue by George Robert Sims

A postcard, from about 1905, which carries and illustrates the first two verses.

"In the Workhouse: Christmas Day", better known as "Christmas Day in the Workhouse", is a dramatic monologue written as a ballad by campaigning journalist George Robert Sims and first published in The Referee for the Christmas of 1877. It appeared in Sims' regular Mustard and Cress column under the pseudonym Dagonet and was collected in book form in 1881 as one of The Dagonet Ballads, which sold over 100,000 copies within a year.

It is a criticism of the harsh conditions in English and Welsh workhouses under the 1834 Poor Law. As a popular and sentimental melodrama, the work has been parodied many times.

== Opening verses ==
It is Christmas Day in the Workhouse,
And the cold bare walls are bright
With garlands of green and holly,
And the place is a pleasant sight;
For with clean-washed hands and faces,
In a long and hungry line
The paupers sit at the tables,
For this is the hour they dine.

And the guardians and their ladies,
Although the wind is east,
Have come in their furs and wrappers,
To watch their charges feast;
To smile and be condescending,
Put pudding on pauper plates,
To be hosts at the workhouse banquet
They've paid for—with the rates.

— Lines 1-16, as reprinted in The Dragonet Ballads (1879)

== Synopsis ==
The poem tells of an old Devon trader named John who has been reduced to poverty and so must eat at the workhouse on Christmas Day. To the shock of the guardians and master of the workhouse, he reviles them for the events of the previous Christmas when his wife, Nance, was starving. They could not afford food so, for the first time, he went to the workhouse but was told that food would not be given out – they would have to come in to eat. At that time, families might be separated inside such institutions but his wife refused to be parted from her husband of fifty years on Christmas Day. He went out again in search of scraps but she died before he returned and so now he is bitter at the memory.

== Author ==
Christmas Day in the Workhouse was for a time vigorously denounced as a mischievous attempt to set the paupers against their betters, but when a well-known social reformer died recently I read in several papers that he always declared that it was reading Christmas Day in the Workhouse which started him on his ceaseless campaign for old age pensions, a campaign which he lived to see crowned with victory.

–George Robert Sims

Sims was a campaigning journalist who, while young, had investigated the poor of London's East End. The details in this ballad were perhaps not accurate, as the Poor Law regulations did permit old couples to cohabit and allow for short-term relief to be given out, but its melodramatic and sentimental style made it very popular and such work made Sims a great success. He went on to write detailed exposés of the life of the poor for periodicals such as the Weekly Dispatch, The Pictorial World and The Daily News, which had been founded by Charles Dickens.

== Parodies ==
Among the many parodies of Sims' ballad are "Christmas Day in the Cookhouse" (1930) by British comedian Billy Bennett, recited by a soldier in the 1969 film Oh! What a Lovely War; "'Twas Christmas Day in the Poorhouse" (2000) by Garrison Keillor; and "Christmas Day in Grey Gables", submitted by a listener to the BBC Radio 4's The Archers message board.

It was Christmas Day in the cookhouse, the happiest day of the year
Mens hearts were full of gladness, and their bellies full of beer
When up popped Private Shorty, his face as bold as brass
He said "you can take your Christmas pudding
And stick it up your....."

Tidings of comfort and joy, comfort and joy
O, tidings of comfort and joy

It was Christmas day in the harem, the eunuchs were standing round
While hundreds of beautiful women lay stretched out on the ground
When in strolled the bold bad Sultan, and gazed at his marble halls
He asked "what do you want for Christmas, boys?"
And the eunuchs answered:

Tidings of comfort and joy, comfort and joy
O, tidings of comfort and joy

An abbreviated and bawdily modified version, entitled "Christmas in the Workhaus", is recited by Edward Asner's character in the 1977, made for Christmas TV movie, The Gathering (1977 film). Although the poem is erroneously attributed Rudyard Kipling, instead of George Robert Sims-(with comically censored words, here in italics with a *);

" Oh, It was Christmas in the Workhaus- the best day of the year. ...And the paupers were all happy- for their guts was full of beer.

The Master of the Workhaus strolled them dismal halls. ...And he shouted "Merry Christmas".....And the workers answered *balls.

Now the Master grew angry and swore by all the gods. ...They'd have no Christmas pudding- the lousy lot of *sods.

Up sprang a war-scarred veteran, who stormed the Kyber Pass. ... You can take your Christmas pudding and *shove it up your A**.

== See also ==
- List of Christmas-themed literature
