= Henry Chance Newton =

British writer (1854–1931)

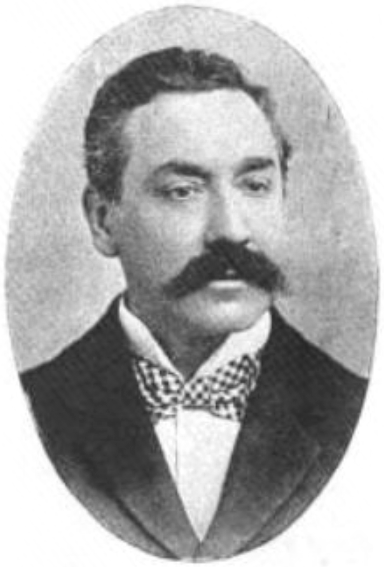
- In The Sketch, 24 July 1895
- Born: 13 March 1854; London, England
- Died: 2 January 1931 (aged 76); London, England
- Burial place: Putney Vale Cemetery
- Occupation(s): Writer, theatre critic

Henry Chance Newton (13 March 1854 – 2 January 1931) was a British author and theatre critic for The Referee magazine.

== Biography ==
Henry Chance Newton was born in London to parents of Northern Irish descent. He had written about the stage since 1875 when he joined the staff of Hood's Comic Annual. He wrote using the pseudonym Gawain, the London correspondent for the New York Dramatic Mirror, and as Carados for The Referee.

Newton, in conjunction with Richard Butler, wrote libretti for musical comedy under the joint collaborative name of Richard Henry. Works attributed to Richard Henry include to Victorian burlesques, Monte Cristo Jr. (a parody of The Count of Monte Cristo, 1886) and Frankenstein, or The Vampire's Victim (a parody of the Mary Shelley novel Frankenstein, 1887), both presented at the Gaiety Theatre, London; and Jubilation (musical mixture, 1887); and Opposition (a debate in one sitting, 1892).

He died at his home in London on 2 January 1931, and was buried at Putney Vale Cemetery.

== Publications ==
- Henry Chance Newton, History of "Ye George and Vulture Tavern" (1909)
- Henry Chance Newton, The Old Vic. and Its Associations: Being My Own Extraordinary Experiences of "Queen Wictoria's Own Theayter" (1923)
- Henry Chance Newton, Idols of the "Halls": being my Music Hall Memories
