= Dandy Dick Whittington =

Comic opera by Ivan Caryll and George Robert Sims

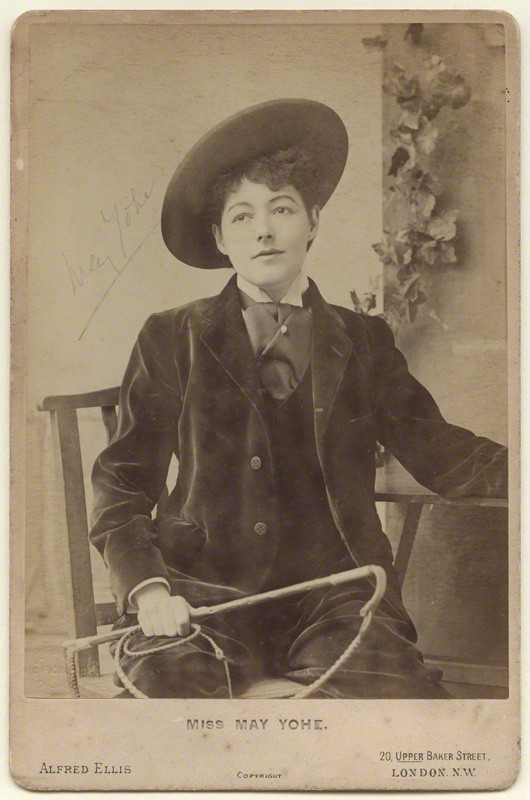
May Yohé as Dandy Dick Whittington

Dandy Dick Whittington was an opéra bouffe in two acts, written by George Robert Sims and composed by Ivan Caryll, based on the folktale Dick Whittington and His Cat. In this version, Dandy Dick performs in a circus and loves the owners' daughter. The circus goes to Siam, where Dick unexpectedly receives a high office and marries his sweetheart. The opera premiered at the Avenue Theatre in London on 2 March 1895 and closed on 13 July 1895. It starred May Yohé as Dick Whittington, Ethel Haydon as Alice, and Henry Wright as Larry O'Brannagan. The conductor was Landon Ronald.

The show was written as a vehicle for Yohé, who had starred in Little Christopher Columbus by the same authors, and producer William Greet leased the theatre especially for Dandy Dick Whittington. The piece was originally written as a pantomime but was later changed to an opéra bouffe (or comic opera). Unlike in the Dick Whittington legend, there are no rats in the piece. Audiences particularly enjoyed the "acrobatic dance" of Florence Levey with Henry Wright. The critic of The Sketch thought Wright's impersonation of the popular actor and comedian of the day, E. J. Lonnen, was as good as the original. Betraying its early roots as a pantomime, John F. Sheridan played the dame, Lady Fitzwarren.

== Synopsis ==
Act I

Dandy Dick Whittington works in Sir Achilles Fitzwarren's circus in London as a circus-rider and has a performing cat that is never let out of its basket. Dick loves the Fitzwarrens' daughter Alice, but Lady Fitzwarren does not find Dick to be an appropriate match for her daughter. Dejected, Dick leaves the circus and asks his acrobat friend, Larry O'Brannagan, what he should do. It turns out, much to Dick's surprise, and through a political expediency, that Larry has been selected as the next King of Siam. The circus and the Fitzwarrens go to Siam, and Dick follows in the H.M.S. Chimpanzee, together with his friend, Captain Fairfax, who loves Lola, known in the circus as the "queen of the arena".

Act II

Fairfax arrives in Siam in time to represent the British Empire at the ceremony to enthrone the new King, Larry. Larry makes Dick the First Minister of Siam. Dandy Dick is now a suitable match for Alice, and Lady Fitzwarren withdraws her opposition to their marriage. The real King returns, and Larry happily steps down, as he may now wed his Siamese love, Willasee. All ends happily, as Dick and Alice celebrate their marriage.

== Roles and original cast ==
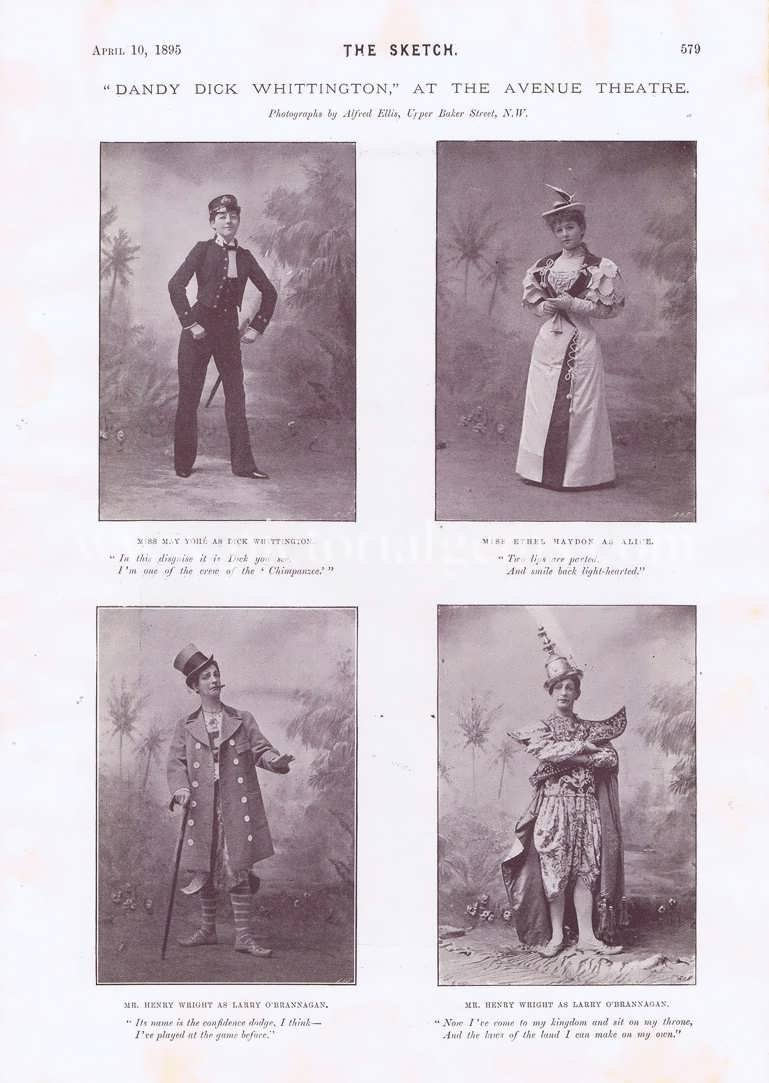
Some of the principal cast of Dandy Dick Whittington

- Dick Whittington, Apprentice to Sir Achilles, with a performing cat – May Yohé
- Sir Achilles Fitzwarren, Sheriff of London and Circus Proprietor – A. J. Evelyn
- Captain Fairfax, R.N., Of H.M.S. Chimpanzee – James Barr; later Roland Cunningham
- Larry O'Brannagan, An Irish Acrobat – Henry Wright
- Koko Gaga, A Siamese Acrobat – Robert Pateman
- Auguste, A Circus Clown – Frederick Vaughan
- Tom, A Sailor – Harold Patterson
- Jones, A Sheriff's Officer
- Phra Maha, Regent of Siam – H. N. Wenman
- Lady Fitzwarren, Sir Achilles' Wife – John F. Sheridan
- Alice, Her Daughter – Ethel Haydon
- Lola, Queen of the Arena – Bertha Meyers
- Jenny, Zoe and Nina, Equestriennes – I. Du Foye, L. Lisle and Miss Morgan
- Susan, Servant of the Inn – Miss Elcho
- Sa Dee, A Siamese Princess – Grace Whiteford
- Willasee, Her Maid of Honour – Florence Levey
- Nuntahtari and Chantawee and Song Kla, Siamese Beauties – Ellen Goss, Maude Fisher
- Fa Xai, Lord in Waiting to the White Elephant
- Xing Xong, Bearer of the Golden Umbrella
- Song Kla, Phuna Tha and See Papat, Of the Siamese Imperial Guard – Mr. McBride, Mr. Shale and Mr. Davies

== Songs ==
Act I - Exterior of Sir Achilles Fitzwarren's house in Highgate

- No. 1 - Chorus – "Hither we come from London Town"
- No. 2 - Lady Fitzwarren and Girls – "The tyrant man has had his day"
- No. 3 - Chorus of Guests – "Here the gay procession passes"
- No. 3a - Chorus of Acrobats and Boys – "We are famous acrobats"
- No. 3b - Lola and Circus Chorus – "Brothers and sisters of the ring"
- No. 3c - Dick with Chorus – "Gaily I ride for my lady love"
- No. 4 - Dick and Alice – "I know not what my fate may be"
- No. 5 - Lady Fitz., Larry and Dick – "If in Siam you land from a civilized state"
- No. 6 - Alice and Girls – "A girl with a guileless heart am I"
- No. 7 - Larry and Chorus – "In London, one night, I went out for a walk"
- No. 8 - Chorus – "Ring! Ring! Bells ring! Ding! Dong!"
- No. 9 - Dick – "Across the vale, the bells ring out beneath the azure dome"
- No. 10 - Finale Act I – "The Circus is closed and the show's at an end"

Act II – Audience Court of the Royal Palace of Bangkok, Siam

- No. 11 - Chorus – "Hark to the beat of drums! It is the Regent comes!"
- No. 12 - Dance
- No. 13 - Fairfax – "The south wind woos with tender lips"
- No. 14 - Dick and Men – "A rover I've wandered o'er oceans afar"
- No. 15 - Circus Chorus – "It's really very curious! It's really very quaint!"
- No. 16 - Lady Fitz. and Chorus – "When you've been three months in a ship at sea"
- No. 17 - Alice – "Said a maiden to her mirror: 'Little mirror, tell me true"
- No. 18 - Lady Fitz., Larry and Dick – "Now I've come to my kingdom"
- No. 19 - Dick with Chorus – "Down by the river when the twilight shadows fall"
- No. 20 - Larry and Willasee – "Prithee, pretty maiden, will you dance with me?"
- No. 21 - Chorus – "Merrily, merrily strike the ranat"
- No. 22 - Finale – "We've put down our coin for a stake that's big"
