= Orlando Morgan =

English music teacher, composer and musicologist (1865–1956)

Robert Orlando Morgan (16 March 1865 – 16 May 1956) was an English music teacher, composer and musicologist. He is best remembered as an influential teacher at the Guildhall School of Music in London, where he taught for 64 years, from 1887 to 1951, as Professor of Pianoforte and Composition. His pupils included the composer Benjamin Frankel and the pianist Dame Myra Hess.

Morgan composed many songs and classical pieces, as well as the music for the last Savoy opera, Two Merry Monarchs (1910), which had poor notices and a brief run. Morgan wrote no more operas but continued to compose prolifically throughout his life.

== Biography ==
=== Early years ===
Morgan was born on 16 March 1865 in Manchester, the son of Peter and Elizabeth Morgan. In 1880, at the age of 15, he entered the Guildhall School of Music. As a student at the Guildhall, he won the Merchant Taylors' scholarship and the Webster prize, becoming a teacher and examiner at the school by the age of 22. In February 1893, he won the Yate prize for composition. In 1894, at the Grand Concours Internationale de Composition Musicale at Brussels, Morgan received the first prize and gold medal.

=== Teacher and musicologist ===
As a teacher, Morgan's tenure at the Guildhall was exceptionally long. When he retired as Professor of Pianoforte and Composition in 1951 at the age of 85, he had completed 64 years of service. Among his pupils were the composer Benjamin Frankel and the pianist Dame Myra Hess as well as Marian McPartland, Charles Wilfred Orr, Harold Truscott and Harry Waldo Warner. By 1915 Morgan had published six volumes of his Modern School of Pianoforte Technique.

A diversion in his normal teaching curriculum was what Fred Astaire called "an attempt" to teach harmony and composition to Astaire and Noël Coward in 1923. Morgan played over a piece that Coward had written and objected to his harmonisation. Coward later recalled, "I was told by my instructor that I could not use consecutive fifths. He went on to explain that a gentleman called Ebenezer Prout had announced many years ago that consecutive fifths were wrong and must in no circumstances be employed.… I argued back that Debussy and Ravel had used consecutive fifths like mad.… I left his presence forever with the parting shot that what was good enough for Debussy and Ravel was good enough for me."

Daisy le Hay and Roland Cunningham in Two Merry Monarchs

As a musicologist, Morgan was known for his practical approach. The Times said of his editions of the classics, "They are meant for performance rather than for the study. The performer is not bothered by extensive footnotes and alternative readings, but has a clear and on the whole reliable text from which to work." Morgan's editions include Bach's Forty-Eight Preludes and Fugues and French Suites; Beethoven's Sonatas; and Schumann's's Novelletten, Kinderszenen and Album für die Jugend. In the 1970s, his edition of the Forty-Eight was regarded as "still the best of all student editions".

=== Composer ===
Morgan was a prolific composer. Among his works were three cantatas, The Crown of Thorns, Zitella and The Legend of Eloisa; two song-cycles for four voices, In Fairy Land and Love Rhapsodies; more than 200 songs and pianoforte pieces; and a comic opera, Two Merry Monarchs. Dedicatees of his works included a wide range of performers including Wilhelm Backhaus, Clara Butt, Benno Moiseiwitsch, Landon Ronald and Myra Hess. The Times wrote of him, "though he manifested sensitiveness and good workmanship, he failed to awaken any lasting impression in original composition." Many of his songs were ballads, perhaps the best-known of which is "Clorinda", with a lyric by John Bledlowe. His short dance piece La bal poudre was chosen as one of ten test pieces for the Daily Express national piano playing competition in 1928. Other songs included "Fair Rosalind", "At Christmastide", "Before the Dawn", "My Gentle White Dove", "Where the Lotus Blooms" and "When Snowflakes Dance".

Morgan's Two Merry Monarchs was the last Savoy opera, produced in 1910 by C. H. Workman. Morgan's contribution to the piece received generally negative reactions in the press. The Times pronounced the music "not very distinguished". The Sunday Times even hinted at plagiarism: "The music was tuneful in parts, sometimes strangely familiar." The Daily Telegraph was mostly critical, writing "the composer falls below the level of accomplishment one might have reasonably expected. There are numbers in the piece, however, which seem to point to his possession of a gift for facile melody. ... The scoring throughout is decidedly thin even for musical comedy." The Evening Standard and St. James, however, had some praise for the music, saying: "It is not extraordinary, but neither is it commonplace except occasionally. He does not write particularly well for the voice, but he has, generally, originality and is always melodious. Some of his songs, not the purely sentimental ones, are fresh, 'catchy', well-written and full of tune." The piece had one of the shortest runs of any Savoy opera, a total of 43 performances, after which it had another week's run at the Strand Theatre, a summer tour, and then disappeared. The score is considered to be lost.

=== Family and death ===
Morgan married the singer Annie Elizabeth Morley. The couple had two sons, Raymond and Cyril Douglas. Cyril became a City Freeman in 1920 and Principal Clerk of the Chamberlain's Office of the Corporation of London in 1946. In later years, Morgan and his wife lived at 9 Harvard Court, Honeybourne Road, Hampstead. Morley died in 1952, and Morgan died four years later in London, aged 91. He was cremated at Golders Green Crematorium.
