= Master and Man (1929 film) =

1929 film

- Directed by: George A. Cooper
- Written by: George Robert Sims (play); Henry Pettitt (play); Edward Dryhurst; George A. Cooper
- Starring: Henri De Vries; Anne Grey; Humberston Wright; Olaf Hytten
- Cinematography: Gustav Pauli
- Production company: British Screen Productions
- Distributed by: British Screen Productions
- Release date: February 1929
- Running time: 8,700 feet
- Country: United Kingdom
- Languages: Sound (Synchronized); Silent Version; English intertitles

Master and Man is a 1929 British drama film directed by George A. Cooper and starring Anne Grey, Henri De Vries and Olaf Hytten. Due to the public's apathy towards silent films, a sound version was also produced in 1929. While the sound version has no audible dialog, it features a synchronized musical score with sound effects along with a theme song. The film was based on the play Master and Man by George Robert Sims and Henry Pettitt, though Cooper is also credited on a novelization published by The London Book Company. It was made at Isleworth Studios.

== Plot ==
A manager of a motor works is sacked for being too old, leading him into a bitter dispute with his former employer.

== Cast ==
- Henri De Vries as Richard Waring
- Anne Grey as Celia Waring
- Humberston Wright as Thomas Blount
- Olaf Hytten as Lord Overbury
- Maurice Braddell as Dick Waring
- Mary Brough as Mrs. Wilkes
- Betty Siddons as Dorothy Blount
- Frank Stanmore as Wilkes
- Winifred Evans

== Music ==
The sound version of the film features a theme song entitled “Tho’ Castles Tumble Down” by Pat Heale, Stanley Damerell and Robert Hargreaves (words) and Harry Tilsley and Tolchard Evans (music).
