= Ernest Perris =

British newspaper editor

Ernest Alfred Perris (1874 – 6 October 1961) was a British newspaper editor.

Born in Liverpool, the son of Henry Woods Perris, Ernest entered journalism, and in 1893 founded the London News Agency. From 1899 he worked in editorial positions at various London newspapers. In 1904, he was appointed as news editor of the Daily Chronicle, establishing it as the main rival to the Daily Mail. While in the post, he financed a film of Ernest Shackleton's Imperial Trans-Antarctic Expedition. In 1914, he appointed his older brother, George Herbert Perris, as its correspondent in France.

In 1918, Perris passed on a rumour to the paper's editor, Robert Donald, that the paper was about to be sold to David Lloyd George. This led to suspicions that he had played a role in arranging the sale. Once the sale was complete, he was appointed as editor, replacing Donald. In 1924, he was additionally appointed as editor of Lloyd's Weekly Newspaper. In 1930, the Daily Chronicle was merged into the News Chronicle, and Perris retired.

Media offices
Preceded by Robert Donald	Editor of the Daily Chronicle; 1918–1930	Succeeded by Newspaper merged
Preceded by William Sugden Robinson	Editor of Lloyd's Weekly Newspaper; 1924–1930	Succeeded by Edgar Wallace
