= Richard Henry (pseudonym) =

Richard Henry is a pseudonym credited on collaborative works of authors Richard Butler and Henry Chance Newton.

Works attributed to Richard Henry include two Victorian burlesques, Monte Cristo Jr. (a parody of The Count of Monte Cristo, 1886) and Frankenstein, or The Vampire's Victim (a parody of the Mary Shelley novel Frankenstein, 1887), both presented at the Gaiety Theatre, London.

== Selected works ==
- Monte Cristo Jr. – (burlesque melodrama, 1886)
- Jubilation – (musical mixture, 1887)
- Frankenstein, or The Vampire's Victim – (burlesque, 1887)
- Opposition – (a debate in one sitting, 1892)
