= Harold Truscott =

British composer and pianist (1914–1992)

Harold Truscott (23 August 1914 – 7 October 1992) was a British composer, pianist, broadcaster and writer on music. Largely neglected as a composer in his lifetime, he made an important contribution to the British piano repertoire and was influential in spreading knowledge of a wide range of mainly unfashionable music.

== Life ==
Born into a working-class family in Seven Kings, east London, Truscott was largely self-taught. By the age of 15 his strong native urge to compose was interpreted by his father as a sign of mental illness and, finding a psychiatrist to endorse this view, he had his son committed to an asylum in Romford. Truscott emerged after 20 weeks with his resolve undimmed. Later he did attend the Guildhall School of Music (1934), where he studied piano with Orlando Morgan, and the Royal College of Music (1943–45) in London on a part-time basis; at the latter he studied piano with Angus Morrison, horn with Frank Probin and received instruction in composition from Herbert Howells. Truscott spent much of his subsequent career teaching music, and eventually became principal lecturer in Music at Huddersfield Polytechnic College. He benefited from his friendship with the composer and broadcaster Robert Simpson, and during the 1950s he performed many broadcast recitals for the BBC, and some of his own compositions were broadcast by notable artists such as John Ogdon.

== Writings ==
After the change in BBC music policy initiated by Sir William Glock in the late 1950s, Truscott's music ceased to receive attention, but he remained active as a copious giver of broadcast talks and contributor to journals on a wide range of subjects. He had an encyclopaedic range of knowledge and enthusiasms, ranging from the central composers of the Classical tradition to marginalised figures of the 19th and 20th centuries who were then deeply unfashionable. His advocacy of Granville Bantock, Havergal Brian, Dussek, Medtner, Hans Pfitzner, Max Reger, Franz Schmidt, Robert Volkmann, Kenneth Leighton and others was as sincere, and informed by an acquaintance with the music as close as his discussions of Schubert's piano sonatas or Haydn's string quartets. His principal writings include books on Beethoven's Late String Quartets (Dobson, 1968) and Franz Schmidt's Orchestral Music (Toccata Press, 1984), as well as important contributions to The Symphony edited by Robert Simpson (Penguin Books, 1966). Unfinished at his death were a volume on Schmidt's chamber music, a study of the music of Korngold, another of Beethoven's Ninth Symphony and a near-complete book on Schubert and the piano. He also left an unfinished autobiography entitled Laughter in the Dark.

- The Music of Franz Schmidt: The orchestral music (1984)

== Music ==
As a composer, Truscott perfected an expanded tonal idiom of contrapuntal intricacy and sometimes terse, no-nonsense expression, but a mystical streak sometimes emerges, as in the finale to his only completed Symphony, and his Elegy for string orchestra, composed in 1944 and never performed in his lifetime, is an utterance of astonishing romantic intensity. Beethoven, Schubert, Medtner and Nielsen are among obvious influences which were subsumed into an individual musical language. He wrote a fairly small amount of vocal and orchestral music, though apart from the Symphony in E major several other symphonies were either lost or remained unfinished. He also composed some notable chamber music, including sonatas for clarinet and piano, cello and piano, and a set of sonatas for solo violin. But the bulk of his output was for his own instrument, the piano, and this includes no less than 22 sonatas, some of epic length and others of pithy concision. He also made completions of several of Schubert's unfinished piano sonatas.

== Selected list of works ==
Orchestral:

- Grasmere Symphony (1938; lost)
- Elegy for string orchestra (1944)
- Symphony in E major (1949–50)
- Symphony in E minor (1951; unfinished, inscribed 'for Harry Newstone', 60pp of full score)
- Fantasia for string orchestra (1961; original titled A window on infinity)
- Prelude, for winds and double bass (1965, from an unfinished suite)
- Suite in G major (1966)

Chamber:

- Piano Quintet (c.1930)
- 2 String Quartets (1944, 1945)
- Trio in A major for flute, violin and viola (1950)
- 3 Sonatas for clarinet and piano (1959, 1965, 1966)
- 3 Sonatas for violin and piano
- Sonata(s) for violin unaccompanied (1946)
- Sonata for oboe and piano (1965)
- Sonata for horn (or cor anglais) and piano (1975–81)
- Sonata for cello and piano (1982–87)

Piano:

- 22 Piano Sonatas (1940–1982)
- 3 Suites for piano (1949–1966)
- 2 Preludes and Fugues (1957)
- Variations and Fugue in B minor on an original theme (1967)

Organ:

- Toccata in A minor (1956)
- Trio-Sonata in E flat major (1971)

== Selected list of writings ==
- 'The Importance of Hans Pfitzner: I – The Palestrina Preludes', Music Survey no. 1, Autumn 1947, pp. 13–15
- 'The Importance of Hans Pfitzner: II – The Chamber Music', Music Survey no. 2, Winter 1948, pp. 37–42
- 'The Music of Edmund Rubbra', Listener, 9 July 1964, p. 70
- 'Beethoven's Late String Quartets', (Dobson, 1968)
- 'Franz Schmidt’s Orchestral Music', (Toccata Press, 1984)
