= The Gathering (1977 film) =

1977 American television drama film directed by Randal Kleiser

- Genre: Drama
- Written by: James Poe
- Directed by: Randal Kleiser
- Starring: Edward Asner; Maureen Stapleton; Rebecca Balding; Sarah Cunningham; Bruce Davison; Veronica Hamel; Gregory Harrison; James Karen; Lawrence Pressman; John Randolph; Gail Strickland; Edward Winter; Stephanie Zimbalist
- Composer: John Barry
- Country of origin: United States
- Original language: English

Production
- Executive producer: Joseph Barbera
- Producer: Harry R. Sherman
- Production locations: Chagrin Falls, Ohio; Hudson, Ohio
- Cinematography: Dennis Dalzell
- Editor: Allan Jacobs
- Running time: 94 minutes
- Production company: Hanna-Barbera Productions

Original release
- Network: ABC
- Release: December 4, 1977

The Gathering is a 1977 American made-for-television drama film produced by Hanna-Barbera Productions for ABC. Written by James Poe, with Joseph Barbera as executive producer, the film tells the story of a dying executive (played by Edward Asner) who arranges a final Christmas reunion with his estranged wife and adult children. The film was directed by Randal Kleiser, and stars Edward Asner in the lead role of dying executive Adam Thornton and Maureen Stapleton as his estranged wife Kate.

== Plot ==
Adam Thornton (Edward Asner), a grumpy, ill-tempered executive who walked out on his wife and family some years before, learns from his doctor (John Randolph) that he only has a little time left to live (30 to 90 days). He decides that he wants to make peace with his wife and family, and to have one last reunion of the family at Christmas before he dies. He confides this information to his estranged wife Kate (Maureen Stapleton) -- but when his doctor says that it won't be good for him to travel, she suggests that they should call their four adult children and invite them all to come home for Christmas.

Adam agrees to this scheme, but only with the provision that the adult children must not be told of his illness and impending death. The major problem is that most of them are not exactly fond of their father, not only because he walked out on their mother, but also because he has an ill-tempered and stubborn nature. Adam is nervous about seeing his adult children again, including the eldest son Tom (Lawrence Pressman), who ultimately figures out why his father asked all of them to come home for Christmas. However, Adam is the most nervous about seeing Bud (Gregory Harrison), to whom he hasn't spoken for several years since he had an angry argument with Bud regarding the Vietnam War and Bud's subsequent move to Canada in order to avoid the draft.

== "Christmas in the Workhaus" ==
An abbreviated and bawdily modified parody of George Robert Sims' famous holiday poem Christmas Day in the Workhouse, is recited by Edward Asner's character, in the family kitchen, to the men only. Apparently this is an expected and longstanding Christmas tradition. Although the poem is erroneously attributed to Rudyard Kipling, instead of George Robert Sims- as follows (the obvious, but comically censored words in italics with a *);

"Oh, It was Christmas in the Workhaus- the best day of the year. ...And the paupers were all happy- for their guts was full of beer.

The Master of the Workhaus strolled them dismal halls. ...And the paupers answered *balls.

The Master grew angry and swore by all the gods. ...They'd have no Christmas pudding- the lousy *sods.

Up sprang a war-scarred veteran, who stormed the Kyber Pass. ... We don't want your Christmas pudding and *you can shove it up your A**.

== Cast ==
- Edward Asner as Adam
- Maureen Stapleton as Kate
- Rebecca Balding as Julie
- Sarah Cunningham as Clara
- Bruce Davison as George
- Veronica Hamel as Helen
- Gregory Harrison as Bud Jr.
- James Karen as Bob Block
- Lawrence Pressman as Tom
- John Randolph as Dr. Hodges
- Gail Strickland as Peggy
- Edward Winter as Roger
- Stephanie Zimbalist as Toni

== Sequel ==
The film was followed by the 1979 sequel The Gathering, Part II, which picked up two years after Adam's death (Edward Asner did not appear in it), and largely concerned Kate's relationship with a new man (Efrem Zimbalist Jr.). It was also produced by Hanna-Barbera.

== Awards ==
- Nomination for and won Emmy for Outstanding Special - Drama or Comedy
- Nomination for Emmy – Outstanding Art Direction for a Dramatic Special - Jan Scott (art director) Anne D. McCulley (set Director)
- Nomination for Emmy – Outstanding Directing in a Special Program - Drama or Comedy - Randal Kleiser
- Nomination for Emmy – Outstanding Lead Actress in a Drama or Comedy Special - Maureen Stapleton
- Nomination for Emmy – Outstanding Writing in a Special Program - Drama or Comedy - Original Teleplay - James Poe (writer)

== Home media ==
The film was released on DVD on Christmas 2009 by Warner Home Video through its Warner Archive label. This is a Manufacture-on-Demand (MOD) release, available through Warner's online store and Amazon.com. This release includes The Gathering - Part II as a bonus.

== See also ==
- List of Christmas films
