= Mabel Love =

British dancer and actress (1874–1953)

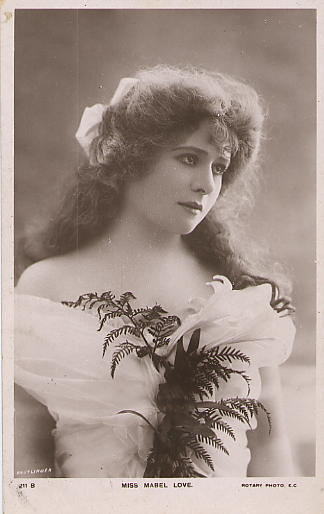
Mabel Love, 1905

Mabel Love (16 October 1874 – 15 May 1953), was a British dancer and stage actress. She was considered to be one of the great stage beauties of her age, and her career spanned the late Victorian era and the Edwardian period. In 1894, Winston Churchill wrote to her asking for a signed photograph. Among her West End stage roles were Francoise in La Cigale and Pepita in Little Christopher Columbus. Later, she appeared in Man and Superman on Broadway.

== Biography ==
Mabel Love was born Mabel Watson in Folkestone, England, the granddaughter of entertainer and ventriloquist William Edward Love, and the second of actress Kate Watson's three daughters (another was Blanche Watson). Love made her stage debut at the age of twelve, at the Prince of Wales Theatre, playing The Rose, in the first stage adaptation of Lewis Carroll's Alice in Wonderland.

In 1887, she played one of the triplet children in Masks and Faces at London's Opera Comique, and the same year, she appeared in the Christmas pantomime at Covent Garden. Still only 14, she enjoyed widespread popularity in George Edwardes's Burlesque Company at the Gaiety Theatre playing the dancing role of Totchen, the vivandière (camp follower) in Faust Up To Date (1888–89).

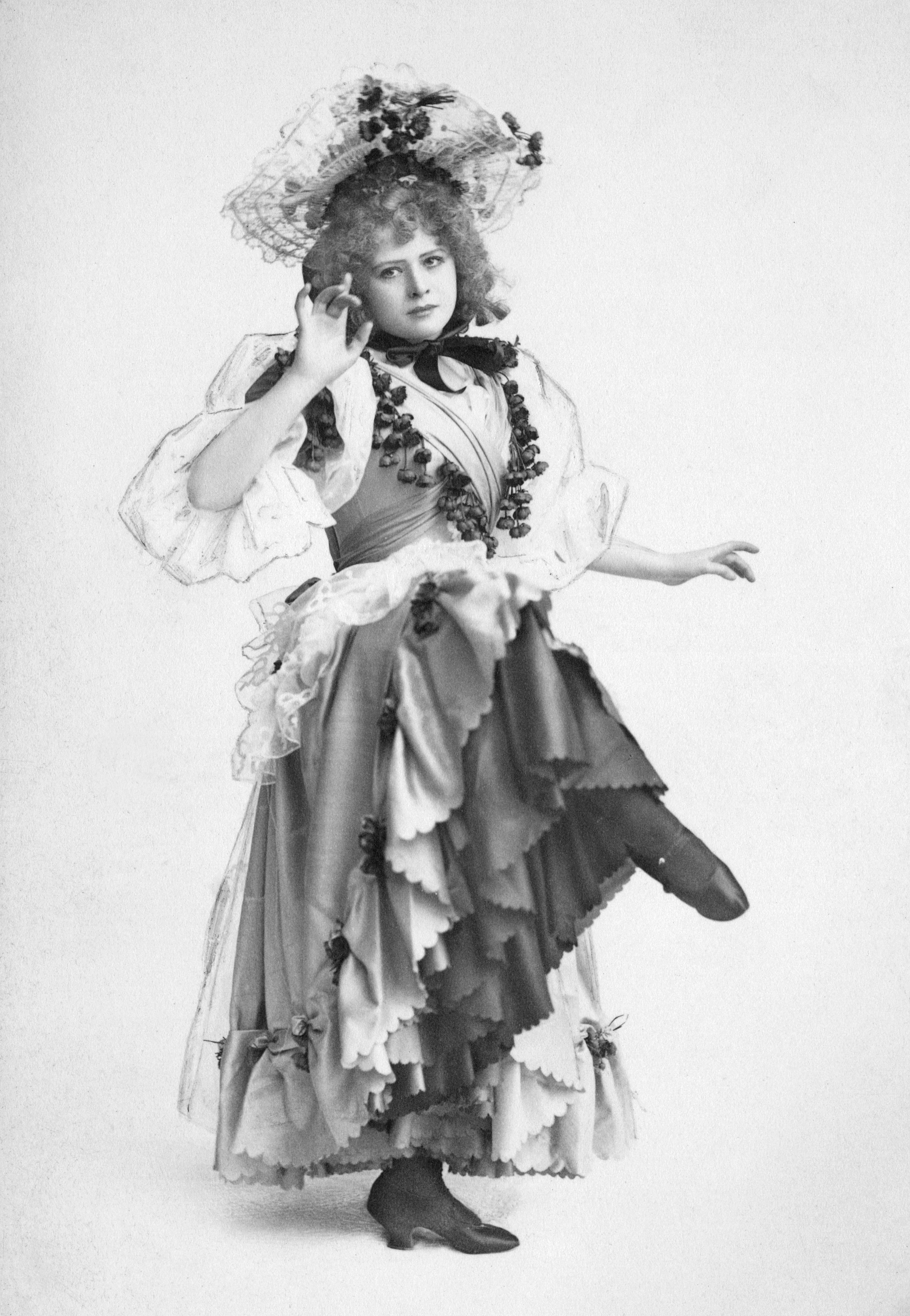
Mabel Love, c. 1894

In March 1889, under the headline "Disappearance of a Burlesque Actress", The Star newspaper reported that Love had disappeared. It was later reported that she had gone to the Thames Embankment, considering suicide. This publicity served merely to increase the public's interest in her. When photographer Frank Foulsham had the idea of selling the images of actresses on postcards, Love proved to be a popular subject leading one writer to christen her "the pretty girl of the postcard".

Over the following 30 years, she starred in a series of burlesques, pantomimes and musical comedies. Among her successes were Francoise in La Cigale and Pepita in Ivan Caryll's Little Christopher Columbus. Later, she appeared at the Folies Bergère in Paris and as Violet Robinson in Man and Superman on Broadway (1912). Love retired from the stage in 1918, and, in 1926, she opened a school of dancing in London. Her only return to the stage was in 1938, as Mary Goss in Profit and Loss at the Embassy Theatre.

Love died at Weybridge, Surrey, England at the age of 78, leaving an illegitimate daughter, Mary Loraine (1913–1973), £2,600 in government bonds. Mary, an actress, worked as a British Special Operations Executive during the Second World War and married first Richard Emrys Thomas in 1935, the general manager of the Egyptian State Railways (they had a son, Richard (1936–2001)), and later BOAC pilot Anthony Loraine in 1948; she died in poverty in a fire at her flat, not knowing that her mother had left her the valuable bonds.
