= Elizabeth Burgwin =

Headteacher and founder of charity supplying free school meals in London

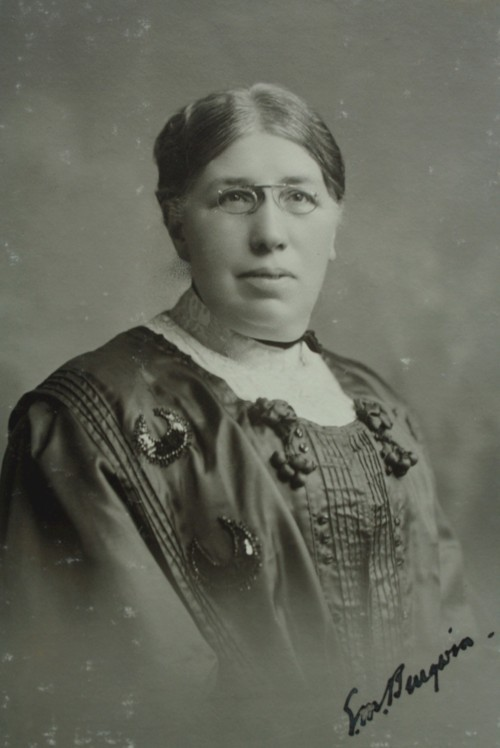
- Born: 3 September 1850; Occold
- Died: 1 February 1940 (aged 89); London
- Awards: Officer of the Order of the British Empire

Elizabeth Burgwin born Elizabeth Canham OBE (1850 – 1940) was a headteacher in London who founded the largest charity supplying free school meals in London. She took an interest in the care of children with learning disabilities.

== Life ==
Burgwin was born in 1850 to Miriam and Samuel Canham. Her father was a labourer on a farm. She was educated in London at Whitelands Training College's school until she began a five-year apprenticeship in Chelsea at St Luke's Parochial Girls' School in 1864. In 1870 she married Thomas William Burgwin who was a butcher and they had their only child.

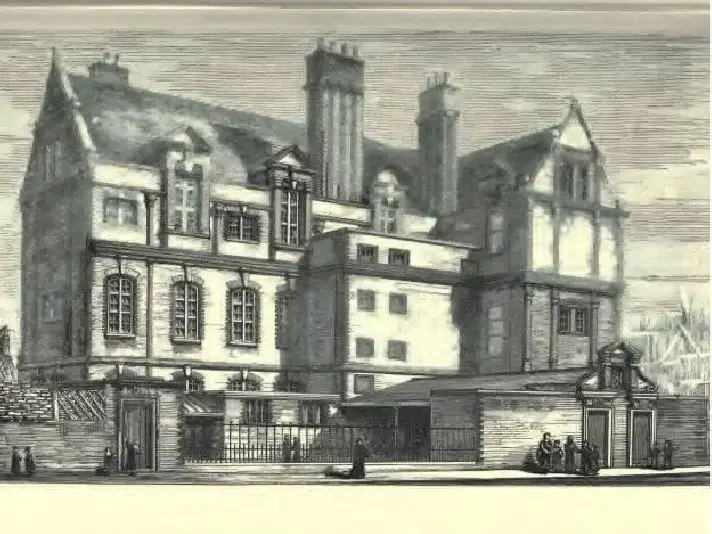
Orange Street school building (designed by Edward Robert Robson)

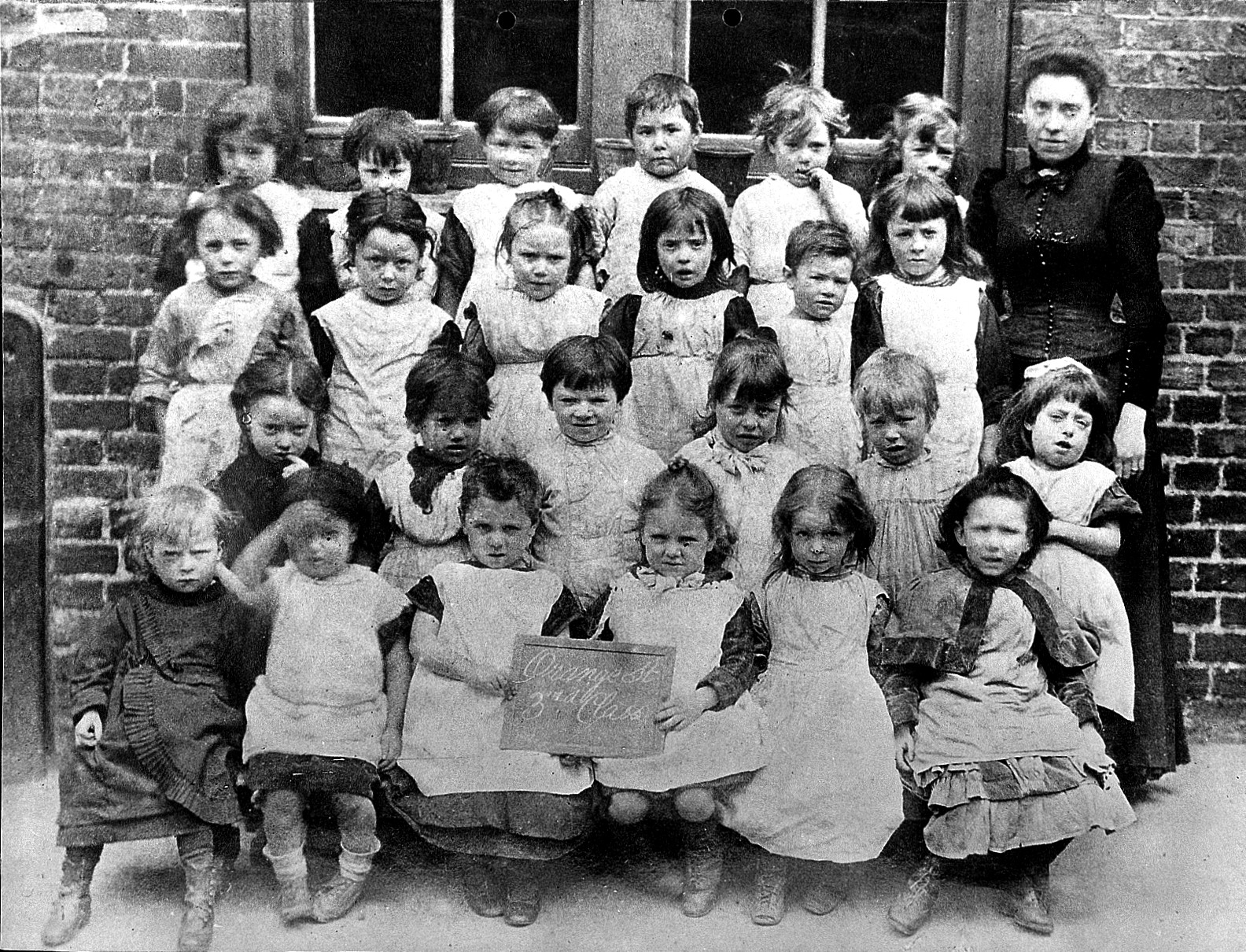
pupils at Orange Street School a few years after she left

She passed the exam and gained her teacher's certificate while teaching for two years in West Ham. There was a huge expansion in teaching caused by the Elementary Education Act 1870 (33 & 34 Vict. c. 75) which required that every child should be taught in a reasonable building led by a qualified head teacher. Sixty-two temporary prefabricated buildings were constructed in London. At the start of 1874 Burgwin became the head of a temporary school (created by the act) until she and the staff moved to the newly constructed Orange Street Girls' School in Southwark that same year. She got involved in welfare when she started to organise a drink and some bread for the malnourished children and this evolved into a meal during the winter which was funded by a small group.

Burgwin approached George Robert Sims who was a successful writer and journalist for The Referee. Together they created the Referee Children's Free Breakfast and Dinner Fund with Burgwin as treasurer. She persuaded Sims to write an annual appeal in The Referee to appeal for funds. The money paid for breakfasts of porridge and jam and the midday meal was described as "suet pudding and potatoes steeped in luscious gravy". The fund they created became the largest charity supplying free school meals in London by 1900.

Burgwin went to study the care of children with learning disabilities in France, Denmark and Germany; in October 1891 the London School Board appointed her as the superintendent of schools for special instruction. In 1897 1,300 children were being educated in classes under her management. The legal basis for this work was confused and Burgwin was part of a deputation to the Education Department and as a result a "Departmental Committee on Defective and Epileptic Children" was formed. The Reverend T W Sharpe was the chair and Burgwin was on the committee and they wanted to find ways to educate the educatable. During the proceedings Ellen Pinsent from Birmingham referred to Burgwin as "having more experience of special schools than anyone else in the world.

She was a supporter of the National League for Opposing Woman Suffrage serving on their executive committee. At a teachers' conference she opposed a motion in support of women's suffrage. She died in 1940.

In 2020 there was a proposal to create a blue plaque for Burgwin to English Heritage; however, it was not accepted.
