= Richard Butler (author) =

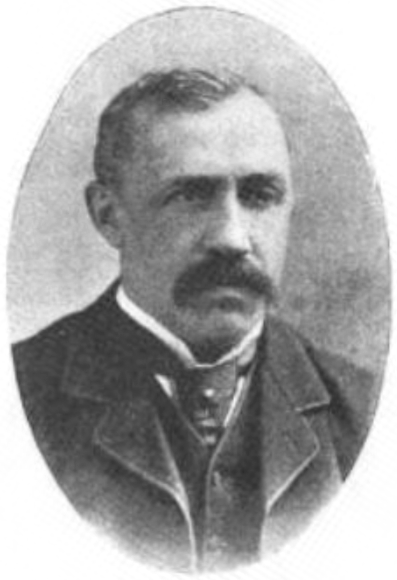
- In The Sketch, 24 July 1895
- Born: Richard William Butler; 21 May 1844; London, England
- Died: 21 December 1928 (aged 84)
- Occupations: Dramatist, magazine editor

Richard William Butler (21 May 1844 – 21 December 1928) was a British dramatist and editor of The Referee magazine in the late Victorian period.

He shared a joint pen name, Richard Henry, with Henry Chance Newton. Works attributed to Richard Henry include two Victorian burlesques, Monte Cristo Jr. (a parody of The Count of Monte Cristo, 1886); Frankenstein, or The Vampire's Victim (a parody of the Mary Shelley novel Frankenstein 1887), both presented at the Gaiety Theatre, London; as well as Jubilation (musical mixture 1887); and Opposition (a debate in one sitting 1892).

== Biography ==
Richard Butler was born in London on 21 May 1844.

He worked as a proofreader for The Daily Telegraph from 1871 to 1877.

He died on 21 December 1928.

== Notes ==
Media offices
Preceded by Henry Sampson	Editor of The Referee; 1891–1921	Succeeded by Robert Donald
