= Robert Donald =

British newspaper editor and author

Sir Robert Donald GBE
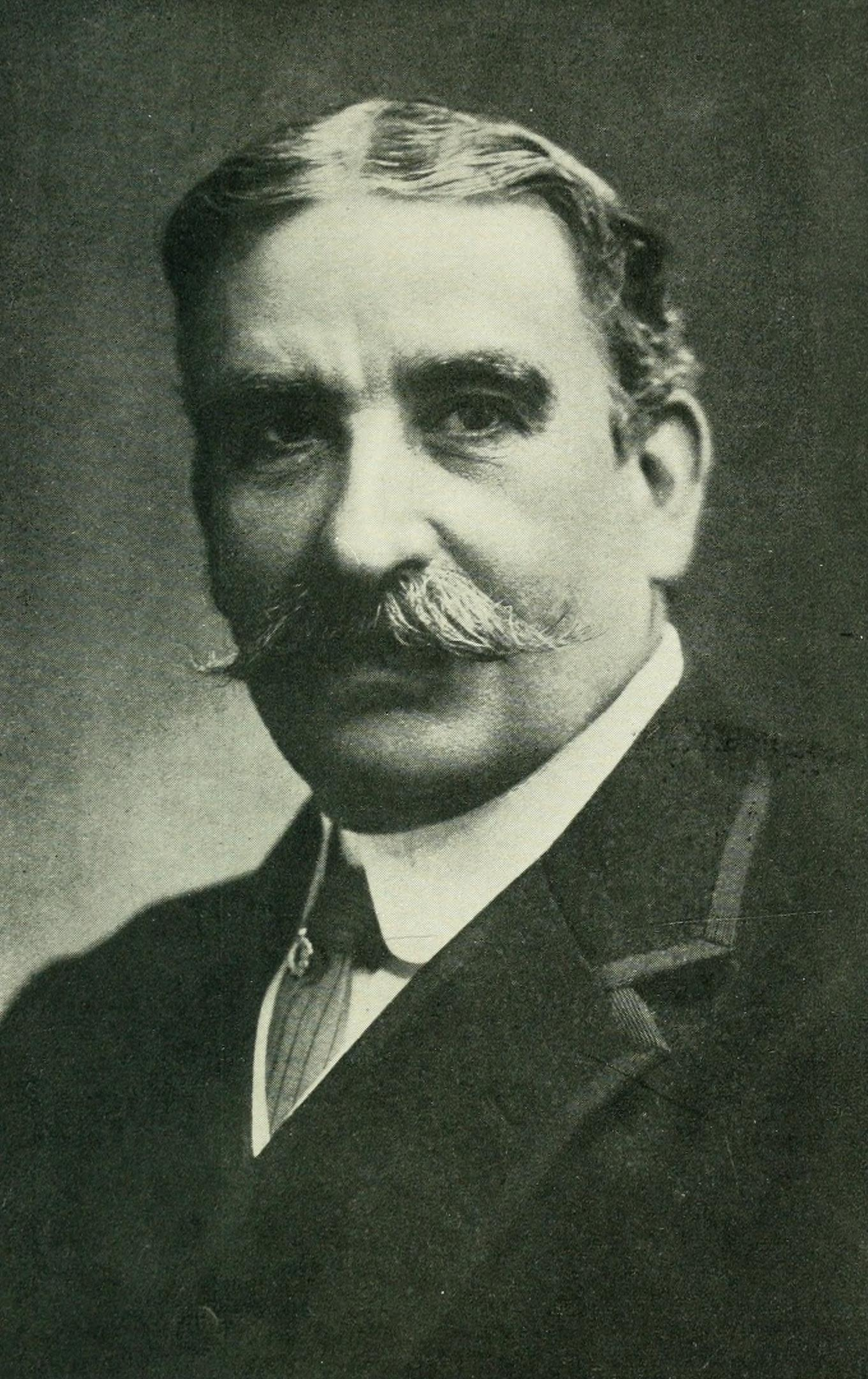

Sir Robert Donald (29 August 1860 – 17 February 1933) was a British newspaper editor and author.

Working as a clerk, Donald submitted free articles to a local journal, then gained employment at the Edinburgh Evening News. He also worked on The Courant and the Northampton Echo before becoming a freelancer. In 1888, he joined The Star, a new London evening newspaper. He specialised in investigations into local government in London, then briefly ran a journal, London, funded by the Progressive Party. With more success, he launched and edited the Municipal Journal and the Municipal Year Book

In 1895, Robert Lloyd (son of Edward Lloyd) appointed Donald as news editor of the Daily Chronicle. He left in 1899 to become publicity manager for Gordon Hotels, but returned to the Chronicle as editor in 1904, also becoming editor of Lloyd's Weekly Newspaper in 1906. He subsequently became managing director of United Newspapers and President of the Institute of Journalists.

Donald long had a friendly relationship with the Prime Minister, David Lloyd George, and in 1917, Lloyd George commissioned him to produce a report on government propaganda efforts, which Donald prepared in just four weeks. He was then appointed to John Buchan's four-person Advisory Committee on the Department of Information, and in December he prepared a further report, calling for greater centralisation of the propaganda effort and a larger role for the Advisory Committee. Donald often questioned Lloyd George's decisions and, in 1918, the two fell out while Donald was a British official observer at the Paris Peace Conference in 1919. A consortium centred on Lloyd George bought the Chronicle and Lloyd's, leading Donald to resign, complaining that Lloyd George was trying to "corner public opinion"

Donald bought The Globe in 1919, but sold it in 1921. The following year, he became editor of The People and The Referee, serving for two years. From 1915 to 1926, Donald chaired the Empire Press Union.

Following the 1922 General Election, Donald was appointed by the Conservative government to chair the Empire Wireless Committee, to urgently 'consider and advise upon the policy to be adopted as regards an Imperial wireless service', a long delayed project promoted heavily by the Empire Press Union.

Donald was appointed a Knight Grand Cross of the Order of the British Empire (GBE) in the 1924 Birthday Honours.

Having been present as an observer at the deliberations for the Treaty of Versailles, Donald was shocked by the leeway given to the Polish delegation - "an embarrassing problem to the Allies of The Great War" - and by the ultimate dismemberment of Germany with its imposed new eastern borders. He travelled to eastern Europe several times in the 1920s culminating in two books largely sympathetic to the German complaints: A Danger Spot in Europe - and Its Government by the League of Nations (1925), and The Polish Corridor and the Consequences (1929) In addition he was sympathetic to Hungary, and after much research there interviewing all the major politicians, and "several years study", he produced a further book: The Tragedy of Trianon - Hungary's Appeal to Humanity, with an Introduction by Viscount Rothermere. Both described central Europe as a "powder magazine".

In 1931, he joined National Labour and edited its party newspaper: initially the News-Letter, and later Everyman.

Media offices
| Preceded by W. J. Fisher | Editor of the Daily Chronicle; 1904–1918 | Succeeded by Ernest Perris |
| Preceded by Thomas Catling | Editor of Lloyd's Weekly Newspaper; 1906–1918 | Succeeded by W. S. Robinson |
| Preceded by John Sansome | Editor of The People; 1922–1924 | Succeeded by Hannen Swaffer |
| Preceded by Richard Butler | Editor of The Referee; 1922–1924 | Succeeded by A. Laber |
