= The Hope Diamond Mystery =

1921 film

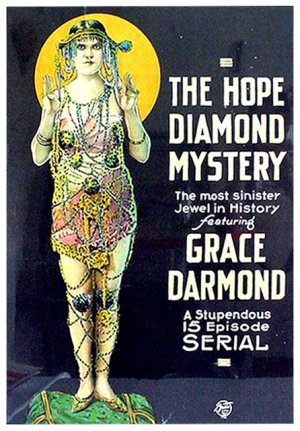
- Film poster
- Directed by: Stuart Paton
- Written by: John B. Clymer; Charles W. Goddard; May Yohé
- Produced by: George Kleine
- Starring: Grace Darmond; Boris Karloff; May Yohe; George Chesebro
- Cinematography: William Thornley
- Edited by: James Wilkinson
- Distributed by: Kosmik Film Co./Howells Sales Co.
- Release date: February 19, 1921
- Running time: 15 episodes
- Country: United States
- Languages: Silent; English intertitles

The Hope Diamond Mystery is a 1921 American 15-chapter action film serial directed by Stuart Paton and featuring Grace Darmond, George Chesebro, May Yohe, and Boris Karloff. The screenplay was written by Charles Goddard and John B. Clymer, based on an autobiographical story by May Yohe (who co-stars as herself).

Chapter One premiered on February 19, 1921, and the final chapter was shown on May 29, 1921. The film survives with a copy at the Library of Congress, which includes all of the hand-tinted color sequences as well.

== Plot ==
The curse of the legendary blue Hope Diamond on all its owners is dramatized, beginning with the gem's discovery in 17th Century India. Lord Francis Hale inherits the Hope Diamond and marries showgirl May Yohe. He later gambles away the family fortune, and May deserts him.

== Cast ==
- Grace Darmond as Mary Hilton/Bibi
- George Chesebro as John Gregge/Jean-Baptiste Tavanier
- Boris Karloff dual role as both Dakar (the Hindu servant) and as the High Priest of Sita
- Harry Carter as Sidney Atherton/Ghung
- William Marion as James Marcon/Bagi
- Carmen Phillips as Wanda Atherton/Miza
- Arthur Clayton (credited as Captain Clayton) as Lord Francis Hale
- Ethel Shannon as Lady Francis Hale
- William Buckley as Reginald Travers
- Frank M. Seki (aka Frank Seka) as Saki
- Harry Archer as Johnson
- May Yohe as Lady Francis Hope (Herself)

== Production ==
This serial was shot on the Universal Pictures lot and a custom-built set, the "Temple of Sita," which reportedly cost $100,000 to build. The film was Boris Karloff's first major film role. A blue color tint was used on title cards in the serial with an illustration of the diamond in the background, and additional special color effects may have been incorporated into other scenes that showed the diamond as well, and evidence of such remains in the existing print of the film. Color effects have been retained in the 2014 restoration of the serial by Eric Stedman of the Serial Squadron. The color effects of this film are so unique and ahead of their time that no other film tried to imitate them. Not until two-strip Technicolor was invented could similar visuals be attained. When watching the film, there are multi-colored tints in a single scene, reminiscent of the old hand-colored shorts of Georges Méliès. The last six chapters almost exclusively feature them. May Yohe appears as herself in each episode's opening and closing.

== Chapter Titles ==
1. The Hope Diamond Mystery
2. The Vanishing Hand
3. The Forged Note
4. The Jewel of Sita
5. A Virgin's Love
6. The House of Terror
7. Flames of Despair
8. Yellow Whisperings
9. The Evil Eye
10. In the Spider's Web
11. The Cup of Fear
12. The Ring of Death
13. The Lash of Hate
14. Primitive Passions
15. An Island of Destiny

== See also ==
- List of film serials
- List of film serials by studio
- Boris Karloff filmography
- Hope Diamond
