= Daily Chronicle =

British newspaper 1872-1930

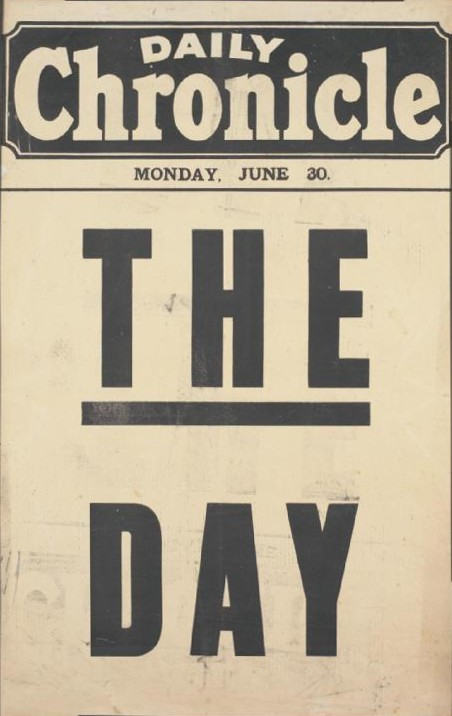
- Placard for the Daily Chronicle : "The Day", 30 June 1919, referring to the signing of the Treaty of Versailles
- Type: Daily newspaper
- Founded: 1872 in London
- Ceased publication: 1930; merged into the Daily News to become the News Chronicle
- Political alignment: Liberal Party
- Headquarters: London

The Daily Chronicle was a left-wing British newspaper that was published from 1872 to 1930 when it merged with the Daily News to become the News Chronicle.

== Foundation ==
The Daily Chronicle was developed by Edward Lloyd out of a local newspaper that had started life as the Clerkenwell News and Domestic Intelligencer, set up as a halfpenny 4-page weekly in 1855.

Launched after the duties on advertising and published news had been abolished in 1853 and July 1855, this local paper specialised in small personal ads. At first, it carried about three times as much advertising as it did local news.

As the formula proved popular, it grew in size and frequency and often changed its name to match. In 1872, it finally changed from the London Daily Chronicle and Clerkenwell News to plain Daily Chronicle. It was then being published daily in eight pages, half of which were news and half advertising.

Edward Lloyd was keenly interested in advertising. It had the potential to generate substantial income and so allow the paper's cover price to be kept low. In time it contributed about 40% of Chronicle revenues. Demand was strong enough to charge a good price per line but, even so, advertising had to be limited to no more than half the paper. The lobby at 81 Fleet Street served as an informal labour exchange where advertisers and targets would search each other out in person.

== Early years ==
Lloyd bought the paper in 1876, paying the owner £30,000 for the title and spending a further £150,000 on setting it up (about £19m in modern money). The Fleet Street office cost a further £40,000 a few years later.

Only a small circle knew about his plan and the public was taken by surprise when it appeared in national daily guise on 28 May 1877. They clearly liked what they read and the new paper was a success from the start. It had inherited a circulation of about 40,000 in 1877 and this rose to 200,000 in a year. It had risen to 400,000 by the outbreak of war in 1914 and doubled during the war. It was reputedly the best selling daily in the 1890s and, during the war, sold more copies than the Times, Telegraph, Morning Post, Evening Standard and Daily Graphic combined.

Lloyd emphasized objective factual reporting without comment or speculation. The Chronicle’s broad coverage contributed to growing its readership. It became the first Fleet Street paper to report industrial disputes systematically. While this aligned with the paper’s political stance, it addressed readers interest in new legislation granting the freedom to join trade unions and picket workplaces.

The paper followed the London County Council and its first election in 1889, and covered religion and the affairs of the church. In the 1880s, it created a special section for colonial news under the title "Greater Britain Day by Day". It also led the way in using specialist correspondents. Ample space was made available for books, literary extracts and the theatre.

Politically the paper was left of centre. It supported the radical wing of the Liberal Party but it might well have supported the Labour Party, had that existed in 1877. From 1892, it supported Irish home rule. John O'Connor Power, Irish MP and powerful orator, was one of its liveliest leader writers.

The Chronicle’s appearance coincided with the expansion of the London suburbs and the commuting by train that went with it. It competed with the Telegraph for that market and for those who felt that elite papers like the Times were not for them. The breadth of its news coverage was welcomed by many because it deliberately ranged far and wide – far beyond the Westminster affairs that dominated Fleet Street at the time.

== Middle years ==
During Lloyd's lifetime, the editor was a literary Irish journalist, Robert Boyle, who had helped Lloyd with the conversion of the paper. He maintained the local news coverage inherited from the Clerkenwell paper, but this was later dropped. He died in February 1890, two months before Lloyd.

The next editor, Alfred Fletcher, had been assistant to Boyle and had a more pronounced left-wing approach. After he left the Chronicle, he stood as a Liberal candidate for Parliament twice but was not elected. Many of his later writings were on education.

In 1894, Henry Massingham was appointed editor. Generally recognised as one of the leading journalists of the day, with influence in the corridors of power, he was able to build up a newspaper that he valued highly.

Although he worked for the Chronicle for a decade, Massingham was editor for just five years. On foreign policy, he was a great believer in the power of diplomacy and expressed his opposition to the Boer War with some vehemence. This went down badly with readers, many of whom had family or friends risking and losing their lives for that cause. As sales were lost, he was asked to resign by Frank Lloyd, son of Edward Lloyd and managing director of the company that owned the paper.

Politically, Massingham was at the radical end of the Liberal Party. He had edited the radical evening paper, The Star, in 1890–91. He went on to become editor of the Nation, where he transferred its allegiance to the Labour Party during the war. He resigned in 1923 when John Maynard Keynes, a Liberal, took it over.

In 1899, the Chronicle's former foreign editor, William Fisher, became editor, handing over to Robert Donald in 1904.

Donald had worked as news editor for the Chronicle but had taken time off journalism to experience an unrelated occupation – promoting a hotel. From 1906, he also edited Lloyd's Weekly News, the Sunday newspaper owned by the Lloyd family.

He was thoughtful and principled, with a firm belief in objective reporting and editorial independence. Under his direction, the paper was broadly supportive of the radical wing of the Liberal Party under David Lloyd George. It was never anti-war, but it was critical of political interference in military strategy.

== Buy-out ==
Donald had got to know Lloyd George well, although he never hesitated to point out failings if justified. After he became prime minister at the end of 1916, Lloyd George valued the Chronicle's impartial and objective coverage and found it the most acceptable of the non-Conservative papers. He misled himself into thinking that Donald was an uncritical supporter, drawing confirmation from Donald's willingness to advise him on the official propaganda effort in 1917 and then to accept an official position – "director of propaganda in neutral countries".

In fact, the relationship between Donald and Lloyd George, always arm's-length in Donald's eyes, had been fatally soured by dealings in 1917 that were unknown to the public. Lloyd George had tried to buy the Chronicle through his political allies. Frank Lloyd, as owner, named his price. Although a realistic valuation, £900,000 was too high for the initial backer, the Liberal peer Lord Leverhulme. Lord Beaverbrook, a Conservative press baron who had promised to support Lloyd George for five years, then became involved as a potential backer.

Since selling to a Conservative proprietor would be anathema, Donald tried to form a rival consortium to buy the paper. This failed but the dealings between him and Lloyd George were irretrievably tainted by underhand behaviour on the prime minister's side of the negotiations.

In 1918, events unexpectedly turned Lloyd George's way, albeit rather uncomfortably. He had assured Parliament on 9 April that the number of British troops facing the German onslaught in March had not been reduced. Frederick Maurice, the general in charge of statistics on the Western Front, was greatly concerned by the inaccuracy of this statement. He wrote to the new Chief of Staff asking whether it should not be exposed, but received no reply. After some days examining his conscience, he decided to write a letter to all the major newspapers.

Four of them published the letter on 7 May. Maurice was forced to resign and Parliament debated the matter on 9 May. Lloyd George won the vote, partly by counterattacking Maurice's figures but largely because there was no obvious successor and the war was at too sensitive a point to risk a governmental crisis. The Chronicle reported the debate factually.

However, a few days later, it recruited Maurice as its military correspondent. This move infuriated the prime minister. Lloyd George was now determined to buy the paper and set about raising the finance from friends of the party and by selling peerages. Beaverbrook was excluded, as were the Berry brothers of Allied Newspapers. The prime mover was Sir Henry Dalziel who already owned Reynold's News. He was rewarded by a knighthood in 1918 and a peerage in 1921.

Wartime inflation had lifted Frank Lloyd's price from £900,000 to £1.1m. In the end, Lloyd George paid £1.6m – probably for a quick sale. He was already planning the early general election that was announced immediately after the Armistice (he won).

Donald and the Chronicle knew nothing of these negotiations. He and Maurice heard a rumour on 3 October 1918 and Frank Lloyd confirmed the following day that the sale had gone through. A new regime was due to come into effect at 6 p.m on 5 October. Both men were obliged to resign.

== Later years ==
The new editor was Ernest Perris, formerly the news editor. Some suspected him of having been complicit in Lloyd George's negotiations. He was the source of the rumour passed on to Donald and Maurice, but this does not indicate whether he was the messenger or equally taken by surprise. He also became editor of Lloyd's Weekly in 1924.

Whatever the loss of independence did to the Chronicle's credibility, its sales did not suffer under the new management. The editorial staff were not unduly interfered with, it seems. Rather, the paper suffered at the hands of corporate finance.

After Lloyd George ceased to be prime minister in 1922, he remained active in politics for the rest of the 1920s. His fall from power marked the end of the Liberal Party as a majority government but that was not apparent at the time. He needed money to back candidates but this time his idea of selling honours was thwarted by the Honours (Prevention of Abuses) Act 1925.

He had a valuable asset in the form of United Newspapers, owner of the Chronicle and other Lloyd publishing interests. He had bought off his fellow investors in 1922 and 1926, presumably at the 1918 valuation or thereabouts. He was sole owner in the sale contract. The question of whether the party should not benefit too caused some controversy at the time.

On 11 July 1927, Lloyd George sold the company to three investors who were rich but lacking experience of publishing, let alone newspapers. They paid him £2.9m. On 17 July 1928, a year and a week later, the three sold the company for £1.5m.

The first of these sales contained a curious clause that preserved Lloyd George's editorial control without responsibility for its liabilities. He was granted a 10-year option to buy back the shares if the Chronicle or Lloyd’s Weekly failed to follow progressive Liberal policies or promoted reactionary or communist views.

This was endorsed by the next owner despite his allegiance to the Conservative Party. He was William Harrison, an entrepreneur who had acquired a number of magazines and provincial newspapers. He had also gone into paper-making through Inveresk Paper Co and that now owned the former Lloyd newspapers. In the 1929 crash, Inveresk's share price fell 80%.

Harrison left the scene. An audit then showed that the Chronicle owed £3m in debt and commitments, had no cash and was suffering a marked loss of sales. It looked doomed. However, News and Westminster Ltd, a Cadbury company, offered to take the Chronicle on and merge it into the Daily News to create the News Chronicle. Their sales would combine to make 1,400,000, which seemed to offer a viable future. It was not a merger of equals, however, and the loss of jobs was borne by the Chronicle.

The News Chronicle prospered until 1956 when its opposition to the UK's involvement in the Suez Crisis caused it to lose readers. Again facing closure, the only offer of help came from Associated Newspapers whose Daily Mail had been the Chronicle's adversary since its launch in 1896.

Associated took an option to buy the company if it did not return to profit. When it failed to do that by the summer of 1960, Associated took over the News Chronicle's plant, property and goodwill. The paper disappeared and, with it, the last vestiges of the Daily Chronicle.

== Editors ==
1872: J. A. Manson
1877: R. Whelan Boyle
1890: Alfred Ewen Fletcher
1895: Henry William Massingham
1899: W. J. Fisher
1904: Robert Donald
1918: Ernest Perris
