= Two Merry Monarchs =

Musical comedy by Orlando Morgan, Arthur Anderson and George Levy

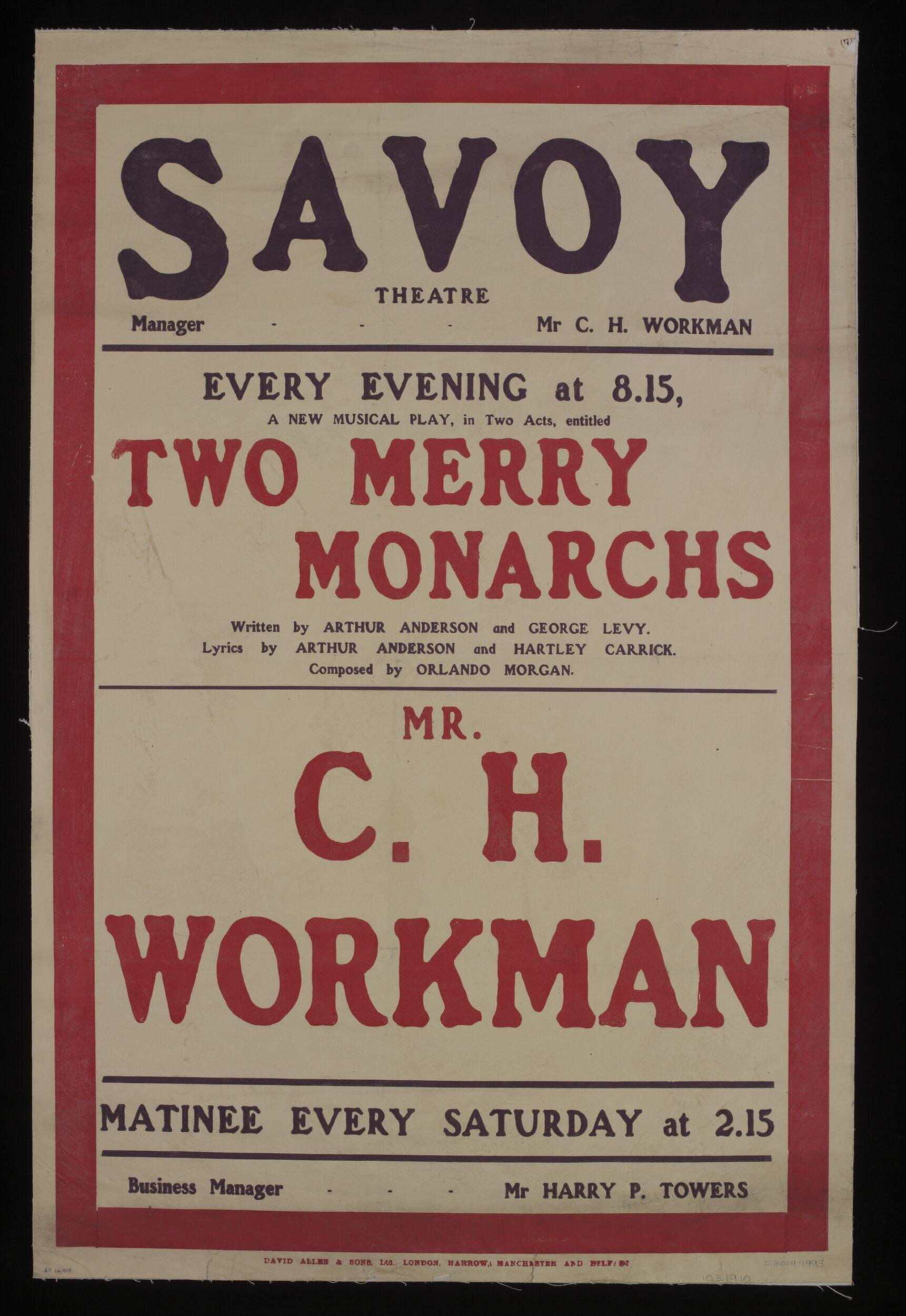
Theatre poster for the original production (1910)

Two Merry Monarchs is an Edwardian musical comedy in two acts with a book by Arthur Anderson and George Levy, lyrics by Anderson and Hartley Carrick, and music by Orlando Morgan. It opened at the Savoy Theatre in London on 10 March 1910, under the management of C. H. Workman, and ran there for 43 performances. It starred Workman, Robert Whyte Jr., Lennox Pawle, Daisy le Hay and Roland Cunningham. The work was the last piece that could be considered a Savoy opera.

There was a brief transfer to the Strand Theatre in London, which ran for an additional six performances, from 30 April to 6 May 1910, and a provincial tour in the late summer of 1910, both starring Hayden Coffin. Another tour was given in the spring of 1911. The score is apparently lost, and the comedy was not subsequently revived.

== Background and production ==
Daisy le Hay and Roland Cunningham

Richard D'Oyly Carte died in 1901, leaving the management of the D'Oyly Carte Opera Company and the Savoy Theatre in the hands of his widow, Helen. After a successful repertory season at the Savoy ending in March 1909, the now-frail Helen Carte leased the theatre to actor C. H. Workman, who had been a long-time principal performer with the D'Oyly Carte Opera Company. Workman produced a season of light opera, beginning with The Mountaineers and Fallen Fairies. Neither of these works had been very successful (despite the cachet of W. S. Gilbert as librettist for the latter), so Workman decided to follow the prevailing tastes of the London public by presenting an Edwardian musical comedy for his third production. Unlike previous Savoy Theatre premieres, and except for Workman and Cunningham, the cast consisted of musical comedy performers and comedians who had neither appeared at the Savoy nor had previously been connected with the D'Oyly Carte organisation.

Two Merry Monarchs opened on 10 March 1910 to an enthusiastic public, but it received mostly poor notices. Despite a lavish production and the skill of the performers concerned, Two Merry Monarchs was withdrawn from the Savoy stage on 23 April 1910, after 43 performances, one of the shortest runs of any Savoy opera. Producer Austen Hurgon picked it up for an attempt at a low-price season of musical comedy at the Strand Theatre, and the production was transferred in whole with the same cast, scenery and costuming, beginning on 30 April 1910. Added to the cast were provincial musical comedy star Philip Smith as Rolandyl and West End leading-man Hayden Coffin as Prince Charmis. But the death of King Edward VII on 6 May forced all theatres to be closed for a week in mourning, and Two Merry Monarchs closed after only six performances there. There was a provincial tour, in which Coffin participated, in the late summer of 1910. When the Strand reopened in September, Two Merry Monarchs was gone from the bill. The piece has not been produced since then using the original score. Although the libretto to Two Merry Monarchs survives in a license copy, the score has not been located.

Workman's last production at the Savoy was a brief run of Gluck's Orpheus, which starred concert artist Marie Brema, and closed after 23 performances. Workman relinquished control of the Savoy. Helen Carte and then her son, Rupert D'Oyly Carte, leased the theatre to other managers, and no more new Savoy operas were produced.

== Synopsis ==
Act I – A laburnum-hung Courtyard outside the Royal Palace of Esperanto

A tocsin-bell summons the populace, who rush out to hear the king's herald, Helvanoise, announce a new law: Kissing is now forbidden for one year under penalty of banishment. Those who wish to continue to kiss must purchase a kissing license from Rolandyl, the Post-Master General. Princess Iris has known about the law for the past three days because she is engaged to the Post-Master General. Princess Cynthia, King Paul's adopted daughter, is in love with Prince Charmis, the Governor of Police. They agree to keep their engagement a secret and do not get a kissing license.

Robert Whyte Jr., C. H. Workman, and Lennox Pawle

The public is incensed about the new law, and led by Caroline, they protest the edict on the steps of the palace. King Paul justifies his decision to enact the law, and when the crowd does not accept his argument, he weeps them into submission. King Paul tells his life story to Rolandyl. Nine hundred years ago, King Paul was an alchemist who discovered the Elixir of Life, and when he drank it, he became immortal. His bonehead assistant stole some of the Elixir and drank it as well. Twenty years ago, King Paul betrothed the adopted daughter of the late King to the King of Utopia, who comes to Esperanto today to claim his affianced bride. King Paul has brought up Princess Cynthia on slow poisons so that she may take a heavy dose of poison without feeling the effects. King Paul plans to get her to kiss the King of Utopia, and he will barter crown and country for an antidote, then King Paul will rule throughout the world.

Meanwhile, Helvanoise is furious to learn that Iris has been flirting with Rolandyl. King Paul tells Cynthia about her betrothal, and when she begins to cry, he gives her an "extra special sweet" to make her feel better. King Utops of Utopia arrives, accompanied by Mandamus and the King's Bodyguard. Princess Cynthia is presented to him, and when he tries to kiss her hand, Charmis interrupts him and informs him that he must get a license before kissing anybody.

Act II – The Reception Room inside the Royal Palace of Esperanto. Evening.

Charmis has called in the constables to act as flunkeys in case of any disturbance this evening. He swears he will protect Cynthia from King Utops at any cost. Six ladies-in-waiting are late for the ball, so Mandamus will not admit them. They press Helvanoise to choose a girl from the six of them, but he declines to make a selection. The ballroom guests appear with Iris, who tells the ladies where they might get a kissing license, even though the men show no interest in purchasing one. Iris decides that when Cynthia and Charmis announce their engagement, she will announce her engagement to the Post-Master General. King Utops works his charm on Cynthia, and when he moves to kiss her, Charmis interrupts them again. Utops produces his license - a license to sell wines and consume liquor on the premises! Utops complains to Paul that Rolandyl sold him the wrong license, and that he does not like Charmis hanging around Cynthia. King Paul orders Rolandyl to set up his office in the reception room and sell licenses to the public.

Utops finally kisses Cynthia, but when Utops fails to respond to the poison, he admits that he was Paul's assistant when he discovered the Elixir of Life. The world is not big enough for two immortal kings, so they decide to fight a duel, in which they drink from two glasses. One is filled with water, the other is filled with a liquid which makes the drinker mortal. So that there is no cheating, Charmis and Mandamus are summoned to supervise the duel. King Paul tells Charmis about the Elixir and explains that he still has a phial in his cabinet. Charmis is to get the phial and bring to him at once. Unbeknownst to them, Charmis mixed the drinks while the kings were blindfolded, and when they drink, they are both in the cart. Charmis returns with Cynthia and everyone, saying that they drank the Elixir and will live forever as King and Queen of Esperanto. Mandamus is appointed King of Utopia, Utops becomes his Lord Chief Justice, and Paul becomes Charmis' Governor of Police. Helvanoise is named the new Post-Master General, and when Rolandyl tries to speak to Iris, she reminds him that she will marry the Post-Master General, who is now Helvanoise. The kissing law is repealed, and the happy couples leave Rolandyl, Utops and Paul disconsolate.

== Roles and Original Cast ==
Alma Barber and C.H. Workman

- Rolandyl, Post-Master General and Assesor of Taxes (baritone) – C. H. Workman
- King Paul of Esperanto – Robert Whyte, Jr.
- King Utops of Utopia (baritone) – Lennox Pawle
- Prince Charmis, Governor of Police (tenor) – Roland Cunningham (then C. Hayden Coffin)
- Helvanoise, King Paul's herald (baritone) – Leslie Stiles
- Mandamus, Lord Chief Justice of Utopia – Neville George
- Head Flunkey – Francis Pater
- Prince Frederick – Alfred Vigay [added for the Strand production]
- Princess Cynthia, King Paul's adopted daughter (soprano) – Daisy Le Hay
- Princess Iris, principal lady-in-waiting (mezzo-soprano) – Alma Barber
- Caroline, a public agitator – Mayne Young, (Lilly Mills)
- Dorothy, a lady-in-waiting – Aileen Peel
- Hermia, another – Marie West
- Gretchen, another – Laurie Opperman, (Josset Elis)
- Jean, another – Joan Adair
- Carmenita, another – Betty Heaps
- Celeste, another – Adeline Waterlow

Chorus of Populace, King's Bodyguard, Out-of-Work Judges, Flunkeys and Ballroom Guests.

== Musical numbers ==
Act I

- No. 1 – "Ding dong! Ding dong!" (Chorus)
- No. 1a – "As labial embracing is absurd" (Helvanoise and Chorus)
- No. 2 – "A Matter of Negotiation" (Iris and Ladies-in-Waiting)
- No. 3 – "If Only" (Cynthia and Charmis)
- No. 4 – "Kiss and Never Tell" (Cynthia and Charmis)
- No. 5 – "All hail King Paul" (Chorus)
- No. 6 – "I'm very sorry" (King Paul, Caroline, Chorus)
- No. 7 – "Have you heard of Ananias?" (King Paul, Rolandyl)
- No. 8 – "Love of my life" (Charmis)
- No. 9 – "There are not enough kings to go round" (Ladies-in-Waiting)
- No. 10 – "A Lesson in Manners" (Rolandyl, Helvanoise, Iris)
- No. 11 – "So drear the day! So long the way!" (Cynthia, Iris, Charmis, Helvanoise)
- No. 12 – "There is obviously something most important in the air" (Chorus):
  - "From across the main" (Helvanoise and Chorus)
  - "High and Mighty Judges" (Out-of-Work Judges)
  - "Utopia" (King Utops)
- No. 13 – Act 1 Finale: "In the name of the Law!" (Ensemble)

Act II

- No. 14 – "We are creme de la creme lady-killers" (Mandamus and Flunkeys)
- No. 15 – "You've got to guard the King's highway" (Charmis and Flunkeys)
- No. 16 – "You'll never call in vain" (Cynthia and Charmis)
- No. 17 – "Six little hearts" (Helvanoise and Ladies-in-Waiting)
- No. 18 – "Music and Mirth" (Chorus)
- No. 19 – "Since the world began" (Iris and Chorus)
- No. 20 – "High Jinks" (Rolandyl and Iris)
- No. 21 – "The only thing a girl can do" (Charmis, Utops and Cynthia)
- No. 22 – "Come and buy" (Rolandyl and Chorus)
- No. 23 – "You must have a license for that" (Rolandyl and Chorus)
- No. 24 – "My King can do no wrong" (Cynthia)
- No. 25 – Act 2 Finale (does not appear in the libretto)

Additional songs

- "I'm one of the boys" (Utops)
- "Misunderstood" (Rolandyl and Chorus)
- "A Girl I could love forever" (Helvanoise and Ladies-in-Waiting)
- "We're as jolly as jolly well can be" (participants not identified)

== Critical reaction ==
Press reports were mostly negative in tone. The Morning Post wrote, "The new musical piece produced at the Savoy Theatre differs in character from the productions for which the house was famous in the past." The press praised the acting and singing of all concerned, as well as the presentation, but they took strong exception to the story and the music. The Times stated that the musical "lacks several elements which are requisite to make a good comic opera". The paper pronounced the music "not very distinguished" and concluded its review, "When one was not regretting Gilbert, one was regretting Sullivan; and when one ceased for a moment to regret Sullivan, one regretted Gilbert." The Era declared "The story becomes less easy to follow as the play proceeds; indeed, it serves as a thread on which to string musical numbers, dances and dialogue." The Daily Telegraph was similarly unimpressed, saying "the composer falls below the level of accomplishment one might have reasonably expected. There are numbers in the piece, however, which seem to point to his possession of a gift for facile melody. ... The scoring throughout is decidedly thin even for musical comedy." The Sunday Times even hinted at plagiarism: "The music was tuneful in parts, sometimes strangely familiar." The Observer commented that the contribution of the costume designer, Percy Anderson, outshone those of the composer and librettists. The Evening Standard and St. James's, however, praised the music, saying "It is not extraordinary, but neither is it commonplace except occasionally. He does not write particularly well for the voice, but he has, generally, originality and is always melodious. Some of his songs, not the purely sentimental ones, are fresh, "catchy", well-written and full of tune."
