= Mark Goulden =

Mark Goulden (1898–1980) was a Jewish British journalist and publisher.

== Life ==
He began his career as a cub reporter for several newspapers and periodicals in Yorkshire, England, becoming managing editor of the Eastern Morning News, the Hull Evening News, the Hull Weekly News, the Yorkshire Evening News (all by the age of 27) and, subsequently, editorial director of the Argus Press (including the weekly journal, Cavalcade). He was managing editor of the Sunday Referee which in addition to its extensive coverage of the news, also published articles by literary, philosophical and artistic contributors including Aldous Huxley, Bertrand Russell, and Osbert Sitwell.

During his tenure at the Sunday Referee, Goulden published the poet Dylan Thomas in "Poet's Corner", and arranged publication of Thomas's first volume of poetry, 18 Poems, through the Panton Press in 1934. Goulden is also considered responsible for initiating the first visit of a reigning British monarch to the United States when, after a meeting with Joseph P. Kennedy in London, Goulden published a proposal on the front page of Cavalcade, 26 July 1938, suggesting that such an event would be "in the interests of Anglo-American relations – [and] in the interests of democracy."

Chairman of the British publishing firm of W.H. Allen and Co. for 36 years, Goulden pioneered the area of entertainment publishing, while continuing to bring major literary works to the attention of the British public. He received numerous citations and awards for his work in humanitarian causes. He was also a pioneer in British civil aviation and co-invented the matrix-drying machine that revolutionised the casting of newspaper stereo-plates. Goulden was portrayed in Jane Campion's 1990 movie, "An Angel at My Table", as the publisher of author Janet Frame.

Mark Goulden died in 1980 from a heart attack.

== Views ==
Goulden is credited as one of the first British publishers to warn the country openly of the rise of the National Socialist Party in Germany, dedicating an entire leader page of The Sunday Referee in April 1933 to an exposé of the secret lives of the Nazi hierarchy. Goulden wrote,

"Men of the Hitler-type are the flowers of a system which functions primarily for the individual and condones, with cynical indifference, the economic and political manipulation of the mass with every instrument from religion to the machine-gun."

In May 1933, Goulden published an interview with Albert Einstein in which the physicist is reported to have said,

"Hitler understands how to raise this instinct [for a violent national feeling] to the power of a collective psychosis. He knows that the hate-lust is more easily inflamed in the presence of a visible and tangible enemy. That is why he has incited Nazi fury against the Jews. They are a convenient target ready to hand for the shafts intended in the near future for other races, at present outside the Nazi bowshot. The world must be warned."

Goulden's editorial attacks on the National Socialists continued until his departure from the newspaper in 1936.

Goulden also wrote Chapter 17 in The Sunflower by Simon Wiesenthal joining many other responses to Simon Wiesenthal’s study culminating with the question regarding a dying Nazi’s request for personal forgiveness for atrocities committed against specific killed Jews. Goulden passionately rails against not only the Nazis, but also post-war Germans and all of those tired of tales of Nazi inhumanity against Jews. His conclusion is that each individual has to determine for oneself a personal stance on forgiveness. He ends Chapter 17 declaring his personal stance by writing "And reflecting on these things, I would have silently left the deathbed having made quite certain there was now one Nazi less in the world!"

Media offices
Preceded by A. Laber	Editor of the Sunday Referee; 1932–1936	Succeeded by R. J. Minney
