= Master and Man (play) =

Play by George R. Sims

Master and Man in a play in four acts by British playwrights George R. Sims and Henry Pettitt. It was written in 1889 for the actor Robert Pateman and his wife, the actress Bella Pateman. The play revolves around the character of Jack Walton who competes for the love of Hester Thornbury with his rivals, Robert Carlton and Humpy Logan.

== Performance history ==
Master and Man premiered at the Prince of Wales Theatre in Birmingham, England on March 18, 1889. That same year it toured to the Tyne Theatre, the Theatre Royal, Middlesbrough, Theatre Royal, Brighton, Prince's Theatre, Bristol, and the Theatre Royal, Cardiff among other British provincial theaters. It opened in London at the Pavilion Theatre, Whitechapel on September 16, 1889. It was positively reviewed in England.

The play was brought to the United States in 1890 by impresario T. Henry French. It was initially staged on Broadway where it ran for less than two weeks; opening at Palmer's Theatre on February 5, 1890 with Richard Mansfield as Humpy Logan, Isabelle Evesson as Hester Thornbury, and J. H. Gilmour as Jack Walton. It was given a scathing reviews in the New-York Tribune, and The New York World. The Philadelphia Inquirer stated it was "the worst melodrama New York has seen for years". The Detroit Free Press summed up reaction to the play as a success for Mansfield's performance as Humpy Logan, but otherwise falling flat with critics.

Despite negative reviews, the Broadway production of Master and Man went on tour, beginning with a transfer to the Grand Opera House in Manhattan with Dominick Murray replacing Mansfield as Humpy Logan. It then toured to Buffalo, New York, Cleveland, Ohio, and Chicago, Illinois among other American cities. At some point on this tour actor Robert Cummings took over the role of Humpy Logan.

== Adaptations ==
The play was adapted into film three times, as a 1915 silent film directed by Percy Nash, a 1929 silent film directed by George A. Cooper and a 1934 film directed by John Harlow.

== Bibliography ==
- Bordman, Gerald Martin. American theatre: a chronicle of comedy and drama, 1869-1914. Oxford University Press, 1994.
