= Roland Cunningham =

British singer and actor (1872–1958)

Daisy le Hay and Roland Cunningham in Two Merry Monarchs

Roland Macquarie Cunningham (1872 – 3 May 1958) was an Australian-born British singer and actor of the late Victorian and Edwardian eras. He began his professional career in comic opera in London in 1895 and appeared briefly with the D'Oyly Carte Opera Company in 1899. In the early years of the next century, he appeared in Edwardian musical comedies in both Britain and America. In 1910, he starred in the long-running original London production of The Chocolate Soldier.

== Life and career ==
Cunningham was born in New South Wales, Australia. A tenor, he made his London debut in 1895 in the opéra bouffe Dandy Dick Whittington at the Avenue Theatre. In 1892, he appeared in the comic opera Toto and Tata, composed by Antoine Banes, as Gaston Manners. He toured for the D'Oyly Carte Opera Company's 'D' Company from July to September in 1899, playing John Manners in Haddon Hall as well as appearing in The Lucky Star. In the same year he married his wife, Mabel Annie, who was born 1869 in Rhyl, Wales and died 12 February 1944 at Bromley, Kent.

In 1904 Cunningham appeared at New York's now-demolished Broadway Theatre as Philip Merivale in the musical comedy The Two Roses. Thereafter, he appeared regularly in musical theatre on the London stage, and acted in Two Merry Monarchs, an Edwardian musical comedy that opened at the Savoy Theatre in London on 10 March 1910, under the management of C. H. Workman.

Cunningham starred as Alexius Sparidoff in the original London production of The Chocolate Soldier at the Lyric Theatre, opposite Workman, for about 500 performances during its original run between 1910 and 1911, reprising the role at the same theatre in 1914.

Roland Cunningham died in 1958 at Bromley in Kent, aged 85.
