= George Robert Sims =

English journalist, poet, dramatist & novelist (1847–1922)

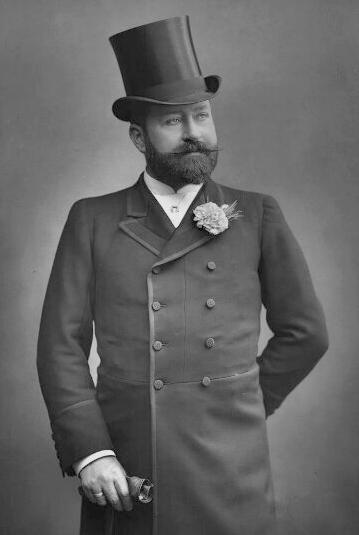
Sims c. 1890

George Robert Sims (2 September 1847 – 4 September 1922) was an English journalist, poet, dramatist, novelist and bon vivant.

In the 1870s Sims began writing lively humour and satiric pieces for Fun magazine, of which he became editor, and The Referee, his light verses from which sold separately and remained popular for decades. He was soon concentrating on social reform, particularly the plight of the poor in London's slums, which helped to bring about reform legislation. He also founded a charity to fund free school meals in London. A prolific journalist and writer, he also produced a number of novels, a volume of reminiscences, writings on leisure and travel, and detective stories.

Sims wrote more than 30 plays, often in collaboration, several of which had long runs, tours and international success. During a tour of one of them, however, the Exeter Theatre Royal burned down, killing 186 people. He bred bulldogs, was an avid sports enthusiast and had a large circle of literary and artistic friends. By the time of his death, he had gambled most of his substantial fortune away. The Times wrote in Sims's obituary that

"so attractive and original was the personality revealed in his abundant output—for he was a wonderfully hard worker—that no other journalist has ever occupied quite the same place in the affections not only of the great public but also of people of more discriminating taste.... Sims was indeed a born journalist, with the essential flair added to shrewd common sense, imagination, wide sympathies, a vivid interest in every side of life, and the most ardent patriotism.... He was [also] a highly successful playwright... a zealous social reformer, an expert criminologist, a connoisseur in good eating and drinking, in racing, in dogs, in boxing, and in all sorts of curious and out-of-the-way people and things."

== Early life and marriages ==
Sims was born in Kennington, London, England. His parents were George Sims, a prosperous merchant, and Louisa Amelia Ann née Stevenson, president of the Women's Provident League. Sims was the oldest of six children, who were exposed to their parents' cosmopolitan artistic and progressive friends, including suffragists. He grew up in Islington, London, and his mother often took him to the theatre. He was educated in Eastbourne and then Hanwell Military College and the University of Bonn. He had begun to write poetry at the age of ten, and at Bonn he wrote some plays, including an adaptation of Dr. Wespe by Roderich Benedix. He completed his studies in Germany and France, where he also became interested in gambling. In Europe, he translated Balzac's Contes drôlatiques, which was published in 1874 by Chatto and Windus; but it was considered too racy and was withdrawn, only to be reissued in 1903.

Sims was married three times and was twice a widower. In 1876 he married Sarah Elizabeth Collis (b. 1850), in 1888 he married Annie Maria Harriss (b. 1859) and in 1901 he married Elizabeth Florence Wykes (b. 1873), who survived him. None of these marriages produced any children.

== Career ==
=== Journalism, satire and social writings ===
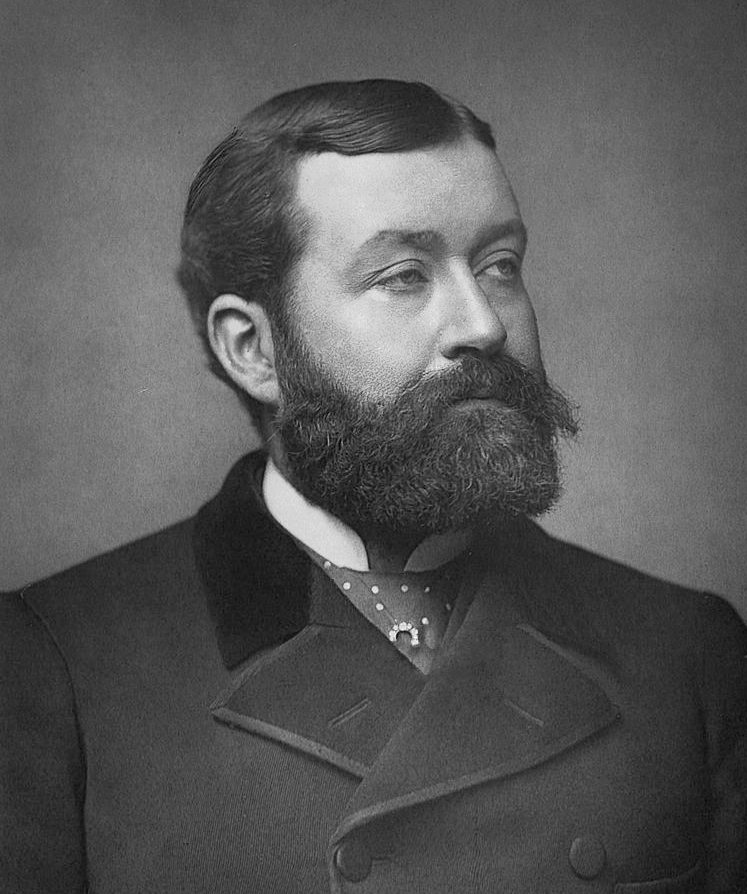
Sims in 1884

He returned to England and briefly worked in his father's business, but his interests lay in writing, and he began to write stories and poetry. He began to publish pieces in Fun in 1874, succeeding editor Tom Hood and making friendships with fellow contributors W. S. Gilbert and Ambrose Bierce. He also contributed early to the Weekly Dispatch. In 1876, Sims penned a satiric open letter "To a Fashionable Tragedian", humorously accusing actor-producer Henry Irving of inciting mass murder by emphasising the gore in his Shakespeare plays and of paying bribes to critics. Irving sued Sims and his editor Harry Sampson for libel, but after an apology he withdrew the legal action.

In 1877, he began contributing to a new Sunday sports and entertainments paper, edited by Sampson, The Referee, writing a weekly column of miscellany, "Mustard and Cress", under the pseudonym Dagonet, until his death. This was so successful that compilations of his verses from the paper, published as The Dagonet Ballads (1879) and Ballads of Babylon (1880), sold in hundreds of thousands of copies and were constantly in print during the next thirty years. He also wrote amusing and popular travelogues, also as Dagonet. He became editor of One and All in 1879 and for various papers wrote about horse racing, showing dogs, boxing, and leisure. Although Sims published his "Mustard and Cress" column every week for 45 years without fail, according to The Times:

"week after week... the page read freshly and seemed always to have something new in it. It was sprinkled with neat little epigrams in verse, patriotic songs or parodies, with jokes, puns, conundrums, catch-words. He talked of politics... philanthropy, amusement, reminiscence, food and drink, and such travel as so confirmed a Cockney could enjoy. ...[H]e would champion the cause of the unfortunate middle classes.... He took his readers into his confidence, and told them all about... his friends... his pets. ... And he contrived to do this without ever becoming egotistical or a bore."

Sims is best remembered for his dramatic monologue from The Dagonet Ballads that opens "It is Christmas Day in the workhouse". Its zealous social concern aroused public sentiment and made Sims a strong voice for reform, dramatising the plight of suffering Londoners. He also contributed numerous articles from 1879 to 1883 about the bad condition of the poor in London's slums in the Sunday Dispatch, Daily News and other papers. Many of these were later published in book form, such as The Theatre of Life (1881, Fuller), Horrible London (1889, Billing and Sons), The Social Kaleidoscope, and The Three Brass Balls. In particular, in 1881, Sims and Frederick Barnard wrote a series of illustrated articles entitled How the Poor Live for a new journal, The Pictorial World. This was published in book form in 1883. He also wrote many popular ballads attempting to draw attention to the predicament of the poor. These efforts were important in raising public opinion on the subject and led to reform legislation in the Housing of the Working Classes Act 1885.

Sims was appointed as part of an 1882 study of social conditions in Southwark in 1882 and as a witness before the 1884 royal commission on working-class housing. Sims also raised public awareness of other issues, including white slave traffic in a series articles published in the Daily Telegraph, later in book form as London by Night (1906) and Watches of the Night (1907); and the maltreatment of children, writing The Black Stain (1907). Together with Elizabeth Burgwin, he founded the Referee Children's Free Breakfast and Dinner Fund (1880). Burgwin had already been supplying free breakfasts and dinners at her school, but she persuaded him to write an annual appeal in The Referee. By 1900 it was the largest charity supplying free school meals in London. He also worked to promote the boys' clubs movement and campaigned to open museums and galleries and permit concerts on Sundays as part of the National Sunday League.

=== Novels, stories and memoir ===
He also published a number of novels, including:

- Rogues and Vagabonds
- Memoirs of Mary Jane
- Mary Jane Married
- Memoirs of a Landlady
- The Ten Commandments
- Li Ting of London

His autobiography, My Life: Sixty Years' Recollections of Bohemian London (1917) became very popular. It consisted of reminiscences originally contributed to The Evening News. Its profiles of Sims London contemporaries are written kindly but with zest. His other books include:

- The Coachman's Club, or, Tales Told Out of School (1897, F. V. White and Co.)
- Living London (3 vols. 1901–1903, Cassell, chronicling the variety in London life)
- Among My Autographs (1904, Chatto & Windus)

Sims was intrigued by the psychology of crime, and he penned some ingenious detective stories. His story collection, Dorcas Dene, Detective (1897) featured an early example of a female detective in crime fiction. One of the Dorcas Dene stories, 'The Haverstock Hill Murder', was dramatised for BBC Radio in 2008. At Arthur Lambton's Crimes Club, Sims took pleasure in discussing cases with Max Pemberton, Conan Doyle and Churton Collins. He was consumed with the murders of Jack the Ripper and even became a suspect. A modern edition of his poetry, Prepare to Shed Them Now: The Ballads of George R Sims, was published in 1968.

Sims's sympathy and wit were not enough to spare him some criticism. To make fun of Sims the National Observer, in 1892, nominated him to succeed Tennyson as poet laureate. The members of the aesthetic movement were sometimes contemptuous of Sims, and in 1894 he was the butt of a spoof in The Green Carnation by Robert Hichens. In 1899, Charles Whibley wrote an acid profile of Sims. Sims later sacrificed some of his standing among progressives with his 1906 campaign in The Tribune, titled "Bitter cry of the middle classes", in which he criticised organised labour and argued that lower middle-class tradesmen and workers were over-taxed in the name of statism.

=== Plays ===
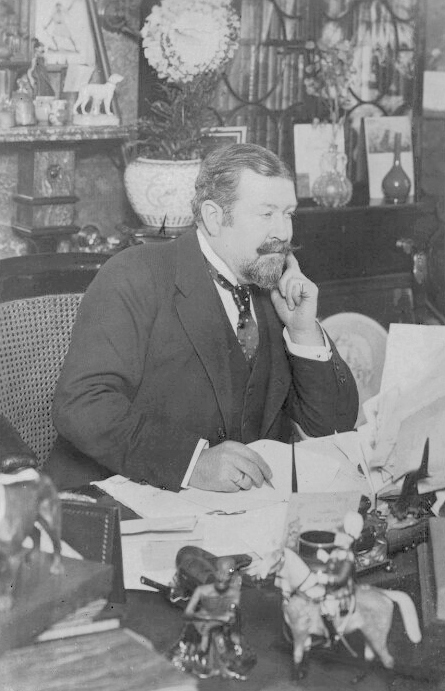
Sims at work

Sims wrote over thirty plays, but most of them were adapted from European pieces. His first hit play, Crutch and Toothpick, based on a French farce by Labiche, was produced at the Royalty Theatre in 1879 and enjoyed a run for 240 nights. In 1881, he wrote the even more successful melodrama, The Lights o' London, produced by Wilson Barrett at the Princess's Theatre, London. This ran for 286 nights and toured in the British provinces, as well as earning record ticket sales in America. It went on to tour continuously in Europe and elsewhere through World War I. His next play, The Romany Rye, opened in 1882 at the Princess's and was a hit. On opening night at the Theatre Royal, Exeter, during its regional tour, scenery caught fire during the performance, causing the Exeter Theatre Royal fire, which remains the UK's deadliest building fire, and worst theatre disaster, killing 186 people. All of the cast and crew survived the fire, which mostly killed audience members in the pits and gallery, and the tour continued, although at the following performance, costumes and scenery had to improvised and borrowed as they had all been lost in the blaze.

In the early 1880s, Sims became the first playwright to have four plays running simultaneously in West End theatres. He also had a dozen touring companies playing his works by that time. He collaborated on many of his plays, and his co-authors included Barrett, Sydney Grundy and Clement Scott. His most successful collaboration was with Henry Pettitt, with whom he created a substantial body of hits, including In the Ranks (1883, 457 performances at the Adelphi Theatre) and The Harbour Lights (1885, 513 performances at the Adelphi). Their Gaiety Theatre musical burlesques included Faust up to Date (1888), which remained a hit for several years and coined a new meaning for the phrase "up-to-date", meaning "abreast" of the latest styles and facts. Their next hit was Carmen up to Data (1890). Both of these were composed by the Gaiety's music director, Meyer Lutz. With Cecil Raleigh, he wrote the hit burlesque opera, Little Christopher Columbus (1893), and among his other musical plays were Blue-eyed Susan at the Prince of Wales Theatre (1892, starring Arthur Roberts) and The Dandy Fifth (Birmingham, 1898) and Dandy Dick Whittington (1895), at the Avenue Theatre, with a score by Ivan Caryll.

Robert Buchanan and Sims co-authored five melodramas at the Adelphi between 1890 and 1893, including The Trumpet Call (1891), starring Mrs Patrick Campbell early in her career. On stage, one night, Mrs. Campbell's costume collapsed which, her biographer suggests, extended the run of that play. Sims and Mrs Campbell had an affair, but she tired of it before he did. In 1896, Sims wrote the melodrama Two Little Vagabonds with Arthur Shirley (an adaptation of Les deux gosses) which was a hit at Princess's Theatre and enjoyed many revivals. He also co-wrote some pantomimes, including Puss in Boots produced at the Drury Lane Theatre. Sims's other famous melodramas included:

- The Golden Ladder
- The Star of India
- The Gypsy Earl
- Scarlet Sin
- The Silver Falls (1888)
- Master and the Man (1889)
- The English Rose (1890)
- The Trumpet Call (1891)
- The White Rose (1892), starring Mrs. Patrick Campbell
- The Lights of Home (1892), starring Mrs. Patrick Campbell
- The Black Domino (1893)

His other notable comedies included:

- *Memoirs of a Mother-in-Law (1881)
- The Member for Slocum (1881)
- The Gay City (1881)

== Later years ==
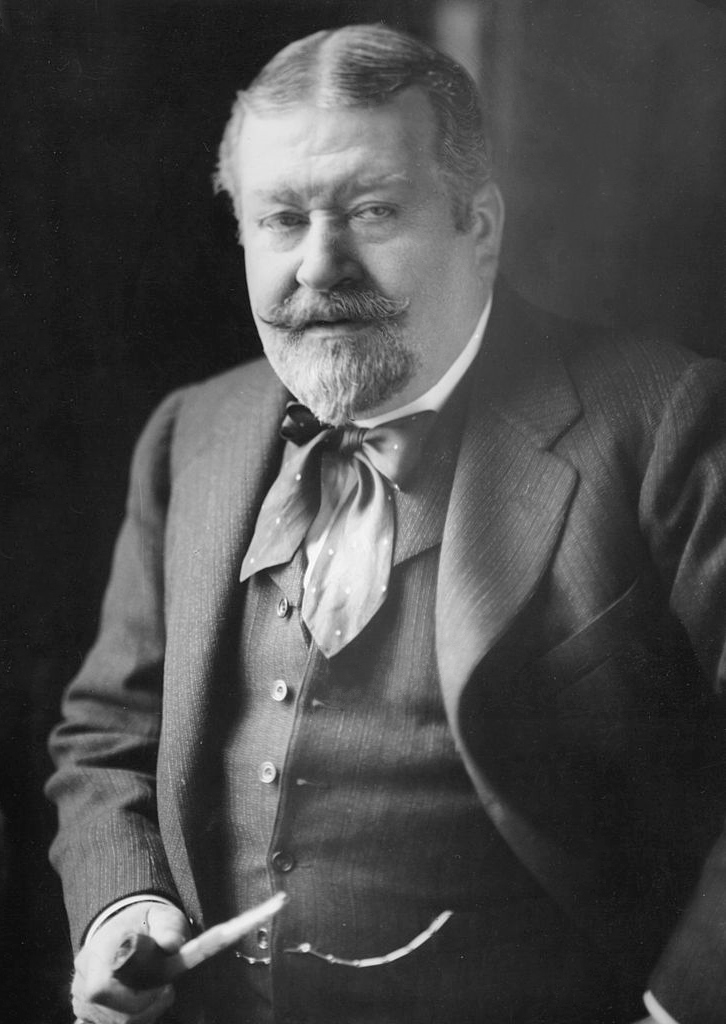
Sims c. 1910

Sims enjoyed his position as a successful author and playwright and belonged to the Devonshire Club, the Eccentric Club and others. He reported earnings of nearly £150,000 in 1898, but he gambled most of his wealth away, or gave it to charities, by the time of his death. He was passionate about sports, especially horse racing and boxing, and he played badminton and bred bulldogs. Sims invented a tonic, Tatcho, that was marketed to cure baldness, but his friends found this a source of mirth when it did not stop his own hairline from receding.

Sims used the Daily Mail to wage a campaign to secure the pardon and release of a Norwegian, Adolph Beck, who had twice been imprisoned because of mistaken identity. This effort led to the establishment, in 1907, of the court of criminal appeal. For his assistance, in 1905, the king of Sweden and Norway made him a knight of the Order of St Olav, first class, awarded by in 1905.

He died at his home in Regent's Park, London, just after his 75th birthday in 1922, from liver cancer. After a funeral service at St Marylebone Parish Church, his body was cremated at Golders Green Crematorium, and his ashes were scattered in the crematorium's grounds.

== Bibliography ==
- George Robert Sims (1904). Among My Autographs. Chatto & Windus.
- George Robert Sims (1881). The Theatre of Life. Fuller.
- George Robert Sims (1889). Horrible London
- George Robert Sims (1897). The Coachman's Club, Or, Tales Told Out of School. F.V. White.
- Sims, G. R. (1917). My life: sixty years' recollections of bohemian London
- Sims, G. R. (1900). Without the limelight: theatrical life as it is
