= Little Christopher Columbus =

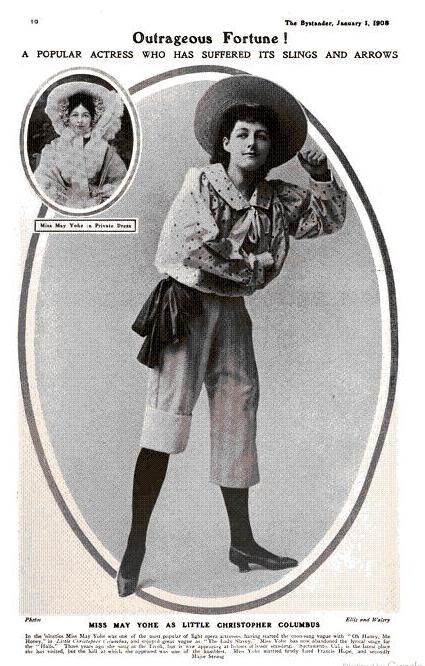
May Yohé as Little Christopher

Little Christopher Columbus is a burlesque opera in two acts, with music by Ivan Caryll and Gustave Kerker and a libretto by George R. Sims and Cecil Raleigh. It opened on 10 October 1893 at the Lyric Theatre in London and then transferred to Terry's Theatre, running for a total of 421 performances, which was a very successful run at the time. May Yohé created the title role, and Furneaux Cook and E. J. Lonnen were in the cast. Mabel Love, Geraldine Ulmar and Florence St. John joined the cast as replacements.

The piece was produced in 1894 in New York at the Garden Theatre and has enjoyed various tours and revivals over the years.

== Roles and original cast ==
- O'hoolegan (Private Detective to Silas Block) – E. J. Lonnen
- Capt. Joseph H. Slammer (of the S.S. "Chocktaw") – Harry Parker
- The Mayor of Cadiz – Henry Wright
- Don Juan (of the Spanish Police) – George Tate
- Hotel Proprietor – Roland Carse
- Silas Block (a Millionaire) – Furneaux Cook
- Pedro, Sebastian, Lopez (Spanish Officers) – Kate Dudley, Vinnie Cassell, Blanche Winter
- Vigilant Cutter (2nd. Officer of the S.S. "Chocktaw") – Maude Vernon
- The Second Mrs. Block – Adelaide Newton
- Hannah (Slammer's Daughter) – Maud Leicester
- Pepita – Eva Moore
- Guinevere Block – Maud Holland
- Mercedes – Rose Hamilton
- Lola – Cissie Cranford
- Salambo Smith – Dora Thorne
- Mysotes Calhoun – Millie Marsden
- Little Christopher – May Yohé

== Musical numbers ==
Act I - The Great Square of Cadiz

- No. 1 - Chorus - "Here in Cadiz flags are flying, from each steeple bells are ringing"
- No. 2 - Soloist and Chorus - "Columbus was a famous man who lost himself at sea"
- No. 3 - Christopher - "Oh! sailor King, who won renown unfading till the world shall end"
- No. 3a - Guinevere - "A pussy cat sat by a silver stream - purr! - singing away in a dainty dream - purr!"
- No. 4 - Chorus - "In an unconventional way they attend the fête today"
- No. 5 - Air de Ballet
- No. 6 - Soloist and Male Chorus - "When you're strolling home to bed thro' the long deserted street"
- No. 7 - Christopher and Chorus - "When the flow'rets droop in the noonday sun, and softly the song-birds trill" (also published as "Lazily, Drowsily - siesta song")
- No. 8 - Guinevere and Christopher - "If in your dreams my face you see, dream on, true heart, for I am near"
- No. 9 - Finale Act I - "Oh, yes! oh, yes! Oh, yes! oh, yes! The dancing girls will give a show before they start for Chicago!"

Act II - The Midway Plaisance, Chicago Exhibition

- No. 10 - Chorus of Foreigners - "We are foreigners come from afar, yes, we are"
- No. 11 - O'Hoolegan and Two Flunkies - "I'm a swell, as you see by my manners and air"
- No. 12 - Christopher, Guinevere, and Mr. & Mrs. Block - "If you wish at the moment to shine in Society"
- No. 13 - Christopher and O'Hoolegan - "There's nothing half so sweet in life, they say, as wedded bliss"
- No. 14 - Duet and Dance - "We are the Sisters Giggle, you know us at a glance"
- No. 15 - Chorus of Germans and Turks - "Ve vas Deutsche frauleins, as you all can see"
- No. 16 - Dance
- No. 17 - "Rumpty Tumpty" Song - (possibly sung by Christopher) - "I am a jolly sort of chap, a fav'rite ev'rywhere"
- No. 18 - Plantation Song - "Oh! honey, my honey, 'tis a dark and stilly night, and only the stars can see"
- No. 19 - Dance - Tarantella
- No. 20 - Finale Act II - "All hail! All hail! All hail! Great Christopher Columbus!"
