= Henry Sampson (newspaper proprietor) =

British newspaper proprietor

Henry Sampson (1841, Lincoln – 16 May 1891) was an English editor, writer and newspaper proprietor.

== Biography ==
Sampson was born in London, the son of a journalist. At the age of twelve, he entered a printing office in London, and became successively a compositor and proof-reader. From youth he was devoted to sport, and excelled as a boxer, runner, and sculler until he was twenty-three, when he was disabled by an accident to his left foot.

In 1866, he was engaged by Samuel Beeton to contribute sporting leaders to the Glow-Worm and the Weekly Dispatch. Afterwards he joined the staff of the Illustrated Sporting News and Theatrical Review, and early in 1869, was appointed editor of that journal. On its collapse on 19 March 1870, he became the first editor of the Latest News (No. 1, 29 August 1869), a penny Sunday paper of sixteen pages, which ceased after No. 57 on 25 September 1870. In 1870, he was engaged as a leader-writer on the Morning Advertiser and started contributing to the humour magazine Fun. During the illness of Tom Hood, he acted as sub-editor of Fun, and after Hood's death in 1874 conducted the paper until February 1878. this led W. S. Gilbert to break with Fun, because Sampson had worked for The Hornet, a satirical newspaper that had criticized Gilbert harshly. From 1875 to 1878, Sampson edited Fun Comic Annual, and wrote stories for its pages.

Early in 1872, he started sending to the Weekly Dispatch, under the pseudonym of "Pendragon", letters of general criticism on sport. Developing the scheme, on 19 August 1877, as part proprietor and editor, under the same pen name, started a weekly sporting paper, The Referee. Its success soon enabled him to give up his other engagements and confine himself exclusively to his own paper for the remainder of his life.

He died at 6 Hall Road, St John's Wood, London, on 16 May 1891.

== Works ==
- Dictionary of Modern Slang, 2nd ed. 1860.
- A History of Advertising from the Earliest Times, 1874.
- Modern Boxing, by Pendragon, 1878.

Media offices
| Preceded by New position | Editor of The Referee; 1877–1891 | Succeeded by Richard Butler |
