= Henry Pettitt =

British actor and dramatist (1848–1893)

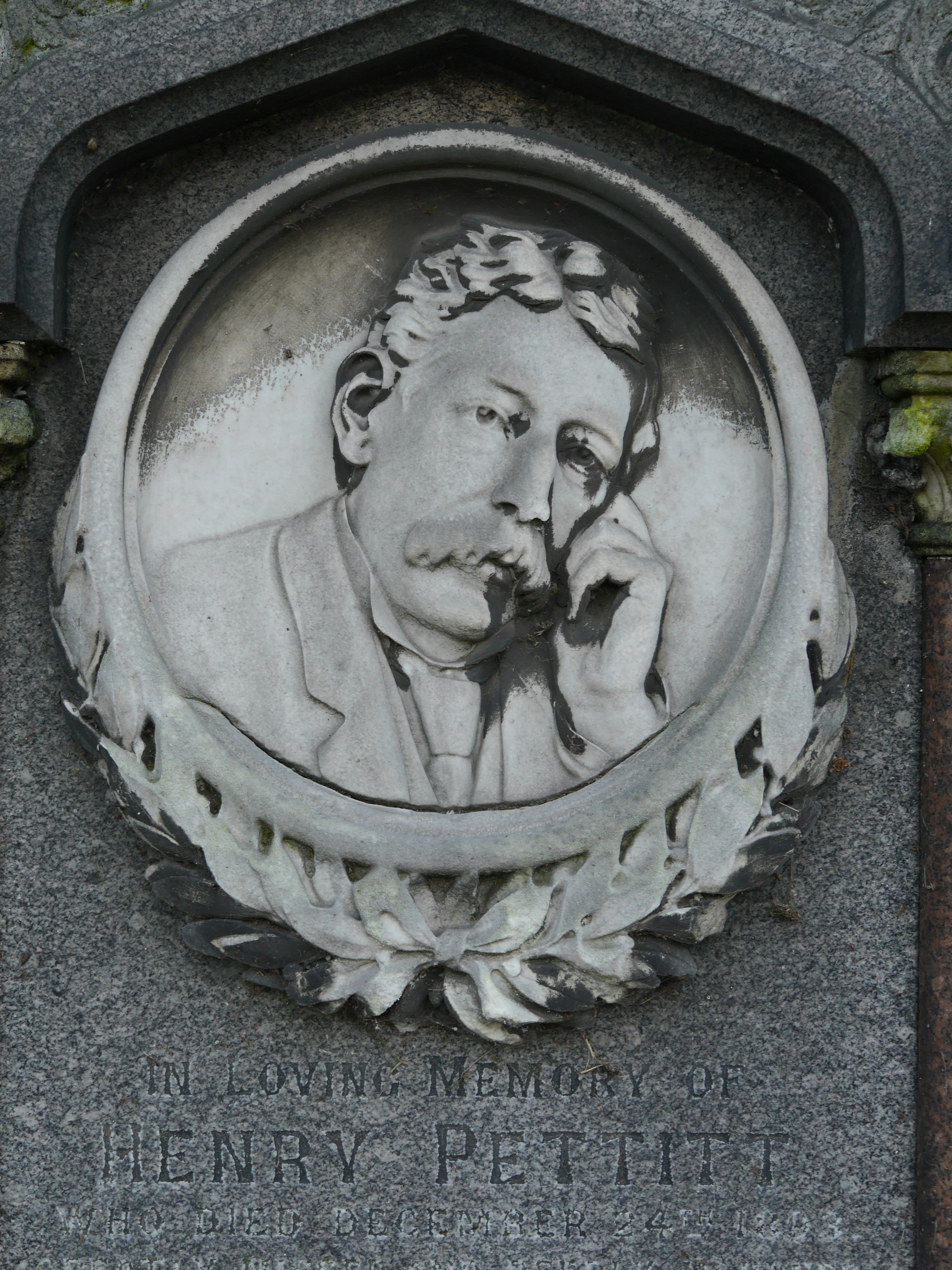
Funerary monument (detail), Brompton Cemetery, London

Henry Alfred Pettitt (7 April 1848 – 24 December 1893), was a British actor and dramatist.

He authored the play Master and Man (1889) with George R. Sims. With Augustus Harris, he wrote the play Burmah, produced on Broadway in 1896. With G. R. Sims, he created a substantial body of very successful works, including In the Ranks (1883, 457 performances at the Adelphi Theatre) and The Harbour Lights (1885, 513 performances at the Adelphi). Their Gaiety Theatre musical burlesques included Faust up to date (1888), which remained a hit for several years and coined a new meaning for the phrase "up-to-date", meaning "abreast" of the latest styles and facts. Their next hit was Carmen up to Data (1890). Both of these were composed by the Gaiety's music director, Meyer Lutz. His Hands Across the Sea (1887), starring William Elton and Isabel Morris, was a favourite in Australia, perhaps on account of its treatment of French convicts transported to New Caledonia.

Pettitt died in Fulham and is buried in Brompton Cemetery, London, on the west side of the main entrance path from the north gate.
