= Sunday Referee =

- Founder: Richard Steele
- Founded: 1877
- Ceased publication: 1939 (absorbed by the Sunday Chronicle)

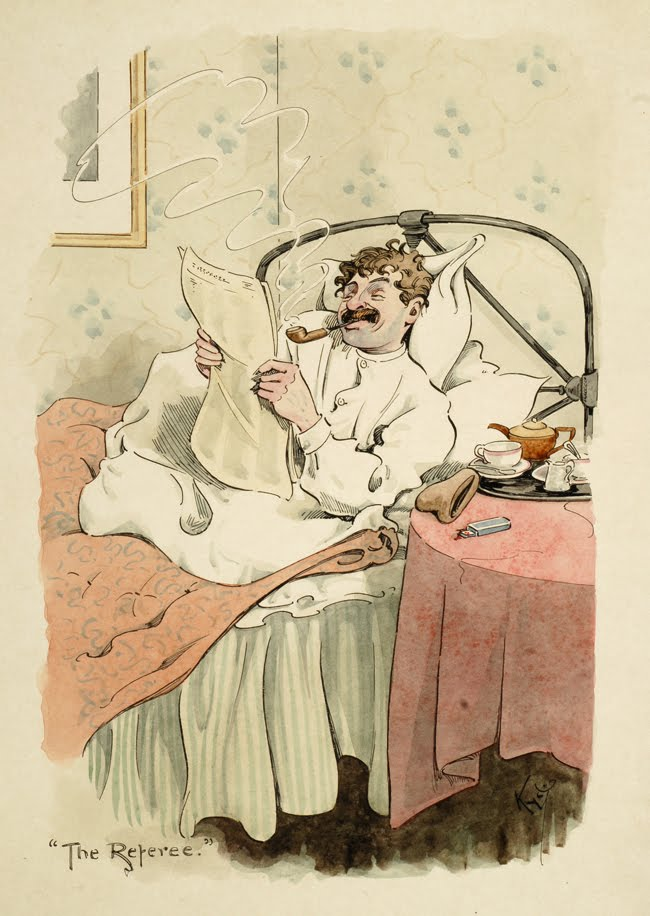
A Reader of The Referee by Joseph Clayton Clark, c. 1900

The Sunday Referee was a Sunday newspaper in the United Kingdom, founded in 1877 as The Referee, primarily covering sports news.

== History ==
George Robert Sims, who was a popular journalist for The Referee, was approached by East End headmistress Elizabeth Burgwin. Together they created the Referee Children's Free Breakfast and Dinner Fund. Sims wrote appeals in The Referee for funds. The fund they created became the largest charity supplying free school meals in London by 1900.

In 1925/26 the paper gave front-page coverage for many weeks to apparent revelations by the writer Frank Power (real name Arthur Vectis Freeman) about the sinking of HMS Hampshire and the disappearance of Herbert Horatio Kitchener ten years previously. These culminated with Power's sensational claim to have returned Kitchener's coffin to Britain, but on official examination it was found to be empty except for weighting material.

During the 1930s, Dylan Thomas contributed several early poems to "The Poet's Corner" column, which was edited by Victor Neuburg. Other columnists during this period included Labour MP Ellen Wilkinson, the "maverick" Liberal politician William Mabane and the philosopher Bertrand Russell. A column reviewing popular records was contributed by Christopher Stone, one of the first "disc jockeys".

The edition of May 24, 1936, had 24 broadsheet pages and cost twopence. The publisher was the Sunday Referee Publishing Company of 17 Tudor Street, London EC4. No edition number was carried. The front page masthead carried the paper's title in Gothic script above the slogan "The national newspaper for all thinking men and women". Seven pages showed the paper's interest in sport but there was also a range of general news, features and show business gossip typical of the Sunday press. One page, for instance, speculated with illustrations on which "beauties" would be the faces of the forthcoming BBC television service.

Considerable money was invested in an attempt to compete with the leading Sunday newspapers, which increased circulation to 400,000, but in 1939 the paper was merged with the Sunday Chronicle.

== Editors ==
1877: Henry Sampson
1891: Richard Butler
1922: Robert Donald
1924: A. Laber
1932: Mark Goulden
1936: R. J. Minney
