= Cow (disambiguation) =

Cow most commonly refers to adult female cattle, and colloquially used to refer to cattle in general.

Cow, cows or COW may also refer to:

== Science and technology ==
- Cow, an adult female of several animals
- AT2018cow, a large astronomical explosion also known as "The Cow"
- Distillation cow, a piece of glassware that allows fractions to be collected without breaking vacuum
- Cell on wheels, a means of providing temporary mobile phone network coverage
- Copy-on-write, in computing

== Literature ==
- Al-Baqara, the second and longest sura of the Qur'an, usually translated as "The Cow"
- Cows, a 1998 novel by Matthew Stokoe
- Cow, the English translation of Beat Sterchi's novel Blösch
- "Cows!", a children's story from the Railway Series book Edward the Blue Engine by the Reverend Wilbert Awdry
- "Cows", a poem from The Wiggles' album Big Red Car

== Film and television ==
- The Cow (1969 film), an Iranian film
- The Cow (1989 film), a Soviet animated short
- Cow (2009 film), a Chinese film
- Cow (2021 film), a British documentary film
- Cow (public service announcement), an anti texting while driving public service announcement
- Cows (TV series), a pilot and cancelled television sitcom produced by Eddie Izzard for Channel 4 in 1997
- Cow, a character in the animated series Cow and Chicken
- Computer Originated World, referring to the globe ID the BBC1 TV network used from 1985 to 1991
- "Cows", an episode from Ben & Holly's Little Kingdom

== Music ==
- Cows (band), a noise rock band from Minneapolis
- Cow (demo), a 1987 EP by Inspiral Carpets
- COW / Chill Out, World!, 2016 album by The Orb

== Other uses ==
- The Cows (painting), a painting by Vincent van Gogh
- Cerritos On Wheels, municipal bus service operated by the City of Cerritos, California, United States
- College of Wooster, liberal arts college in Wooster, Ohio, United States
- Cow Hell Swamp, Georgia, United States
- Crude oil washing
- Cows Creamery, a Canadian ice cream brand
- Cowdenbeath railway station, Scotland, National Rail station code
- Cow, part of a cow–calf railroad locomotive set
- COWS, a mnemonic for Cold Opposite, Warm Same in the caloric reflex test
- Cow (Mario), also known as a Moo Moo, a species and playable driver in the Mario Kart series
- Chicken-of-the-woods, a common and culinary name for the bracket fungus Laetiporus sulphureus

== See also ==
- Vacas (English: Cows), a 1991 Spanish film
- Kráva (English: The Cow), a 1994 Czech film by Karel Kachyňa
- Sacred cow (disambiguation)
- Cow Run (disambiguation)
- Cowes
- Kow (disambiguation)
