= Kow =

Kow or KOW may refer to:

- Kow (bull), a legendary bull in Meitei mythology of Manipur
- Ganzhou Huangjin Airport, IATA code KOW
- Ganzhou Huangjin Airport (former), IATA code KOW until replaced by new airport in 2008
- Kow Swamp, Victoria, Australia
  - Kow Swamp Archaeological Site
- The Kings of Wessex Academy, a school in Somerset, England
- Kowloon station (MTR), Hong Kong, MTR station code KOW
- Octanol-water partition coefficient, K_{ow}
- Kou language

== People with the given name ==
- Kow Nkensen Arkaah (1927–2001), Ghanaian politician
- Kow Otani (born 1957), Japanese composer
- Andrew Kow Afful, Ghanaian diplomat

== People with the surname ==
- Eric Lee Kow (1912–1961), West Indian cricket umpire
- Shih-Li Kow (born 1968), Malaysian writer

== See also ==
- Cow (disambiguation)
- Kau (disambiguation)
