= Holy cow =

Holy cow may refer to:

- Holy cow (expression), an exclamation of surprise
- Cattle in religion and mythology, particularly in Hinduism, Zoroastrianism, and ancient Egyptian religion
  - Sacred bull, as it pertains to ancient mythology
- Holy Cow (novel), a 2015 novel by David Duchovny
- Holy Cow (2022 film), an Indian Hindi-language film
- Holy Cow (2024 film), a French film

== Proper names ==
- Holy Cow, an Indian travelogue by Sarah Macdonald (journalist)
- Holy Cow Casino and Brewery, a casino in Las Vegas, Nevada

== Songs ==
- "Holy Cow" (song), a 1966 hit single by Lee Dorsey
- "Holy Cow", a song by K-OS on the album The Anchorman Mixtape
- "Holy Cow", a song by Yolanda Be Cool

== See also ==
- Sacred cow (disambiguation)
