= Copies by Vincent van Gogh =

Series of paintings by Vincent van Gogh

Noon - Rest from Work (after Millet)
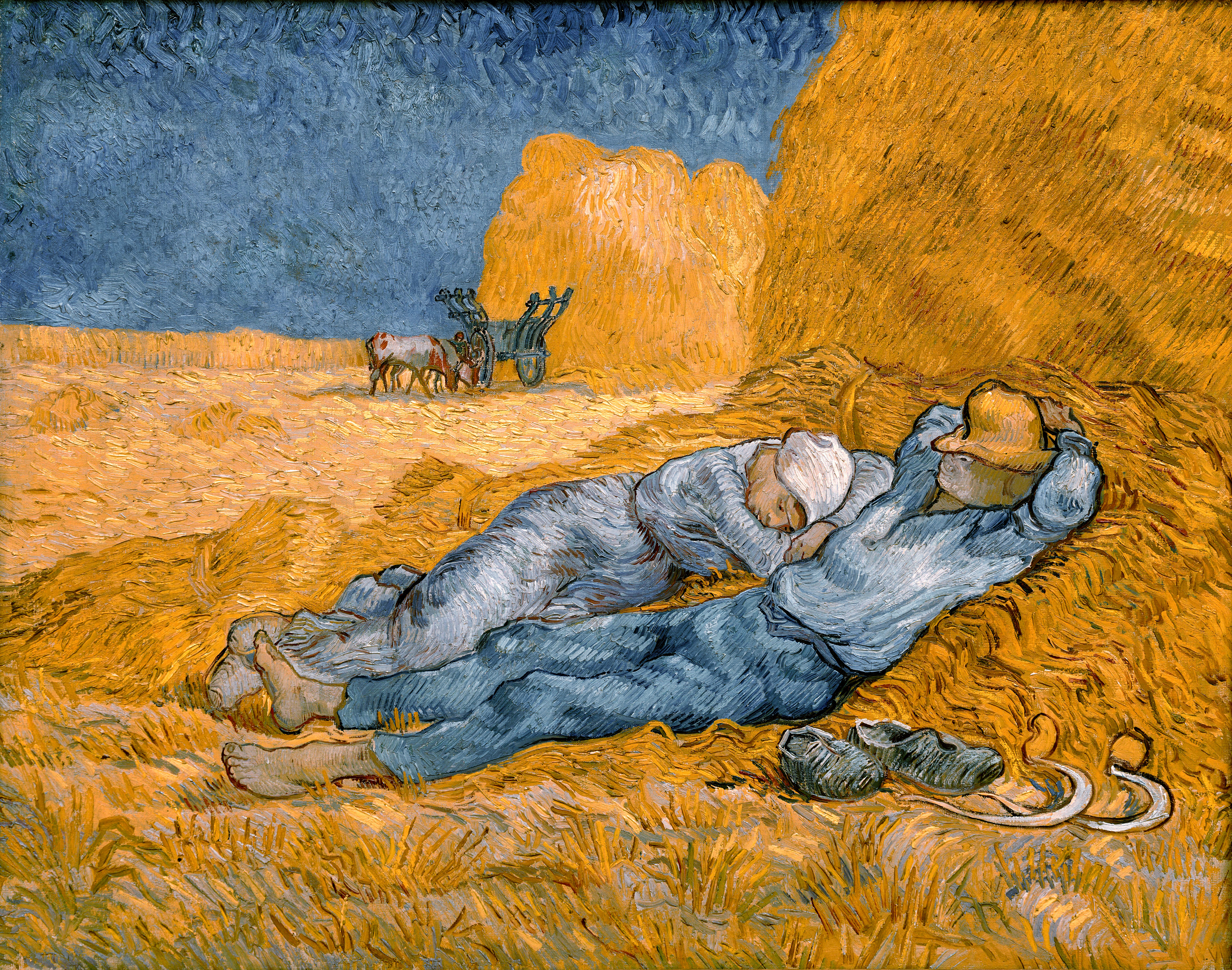
- Artist: Vincent van Gogh
- Year: 1890
- Medium: Oil on canvas
- Dimensions: 73.0 cm × 91.0 cm (28.7 in × 35.8 in)
- Location: Musée d'Orsay, Paris

Vincent van Gogh made many copies of other people's work between 1887 and early 1890, which can be considered appropriation art. While at Saint-Paul asylum in Saint-Rémy-de-Provence, France, where Van Gogh admitted himself, he strived to have subjects during the cold winter months. Seeking to be reinvigorated artistically, Van Gogh did more than 30 copies of works by some of his favorite artists. About twenty-one of the works were copies after, or inspired by, Jean-François Millet. Rather than replicate, Van Gogh sought to translate the subjects and composition through his perspective, color, and technique. Spiritual meaning and emotional comfort were expressed through symbolism and color. His brother Theo van Gogh would call the pieces in the series some of his best work.

== Background ==
During the winter months at Saint-Remy Van Gogh had a shortage of subjects for his work. Residing at Saint-Paul asylum, he did not have the freedom he enjoyed in the past, the weather was too cold to work outdoors and he did not have access to models for paintings. Van Gogh took up copying some of his favorite works of others, which became the primary source of his work during the winter months. The Pietà (after Delacroix) marks the start of a series of paintings that Van Gogh made after artists such as Jean-François Millet, Honoré Daumier and Rembrandt. Millet's work, who greatly influenced Van Gogh, figures prominently in this series. He wrote to Theo about these copies: "I started making them inadvertently and now find that I can learn from them and that they give me a kind of comfort. My brush then moves through my fingers like a bow over the strings of a violin – completely for my pleasure."

Several religious works, such as The Pietà, were included in the series, notable exceptions in his oeuvre. Saint-Paul asylum, housed in an old monastery, may have provided some of the inspiration for the specific subject. The nuns devoutness sometimes annoyed him, but he did find solace in religion. He wrote: "I am not indifferent, and pious thoughts often console me in my suffering."

Van Gogh Museum asserts that Van Gogh may have identified with Christ "who had also suffered and been misunderstood." They also offer the conjecture of some scholars of a resemblance between the Van Gogh and the red-bearded Christ in The Pietà and Lazarus in the copy after Rembrandt. However it is unknown whether or not this was Van Gogh's intention.

== Copy after Émile Bernard ==
Émile Bernard, an artist and Catholic mystic, was a close personal friend to Van Gogh. Bernard influenced Van Gogh artistically several ways. Bernard outlined figures in black, replicating the look of religious woodcut images of the Middle Ages. This resulted in a flattened, more primitive work. Van Gogh's Crows over the Wheatfield is one example of how Bernard's simplified form influenced his work. Bernard also taught Van Gogh about how to manipulate perspective in his work. Just as Van Gogh used color to express emotion, he used distortion of perspective as a means of artistic expression and a vehicle to "modernize" his work.

As a demonstration of the sharing of artistic viewpoints, Van Gogh painted a copy in watercolor of a sketch made by Bernard of Breton woman. Van Gogh wrote to Bernard of a utopian ideal where artists worked cooperatively, focused on a common idea, to reach heights artistically "beyond the power of the isolated individual." As a means of clarification, he stated that did not mean that several painters would work on the same picture, but they will each create a work that "nonetheless belong together and complement each other." The Breton Women is one of many examples of how Van Gogh and one of his friend's brought their unique temperaments and skills to a single idea.

Van Gogh wrote to Bernard his trade of the Breton Women to Paul Gauguin: "Let me make it perfectly clear that I was looking forward to seeing the sort of things that are in that painting of yours which Gauguin has, those Breton women walking in a meadow so beautifully composed, the colour with such naive distinction." Gauguin made a work, Breton Peasant Women which was may have been inspired by Bernard's work of Breton women.

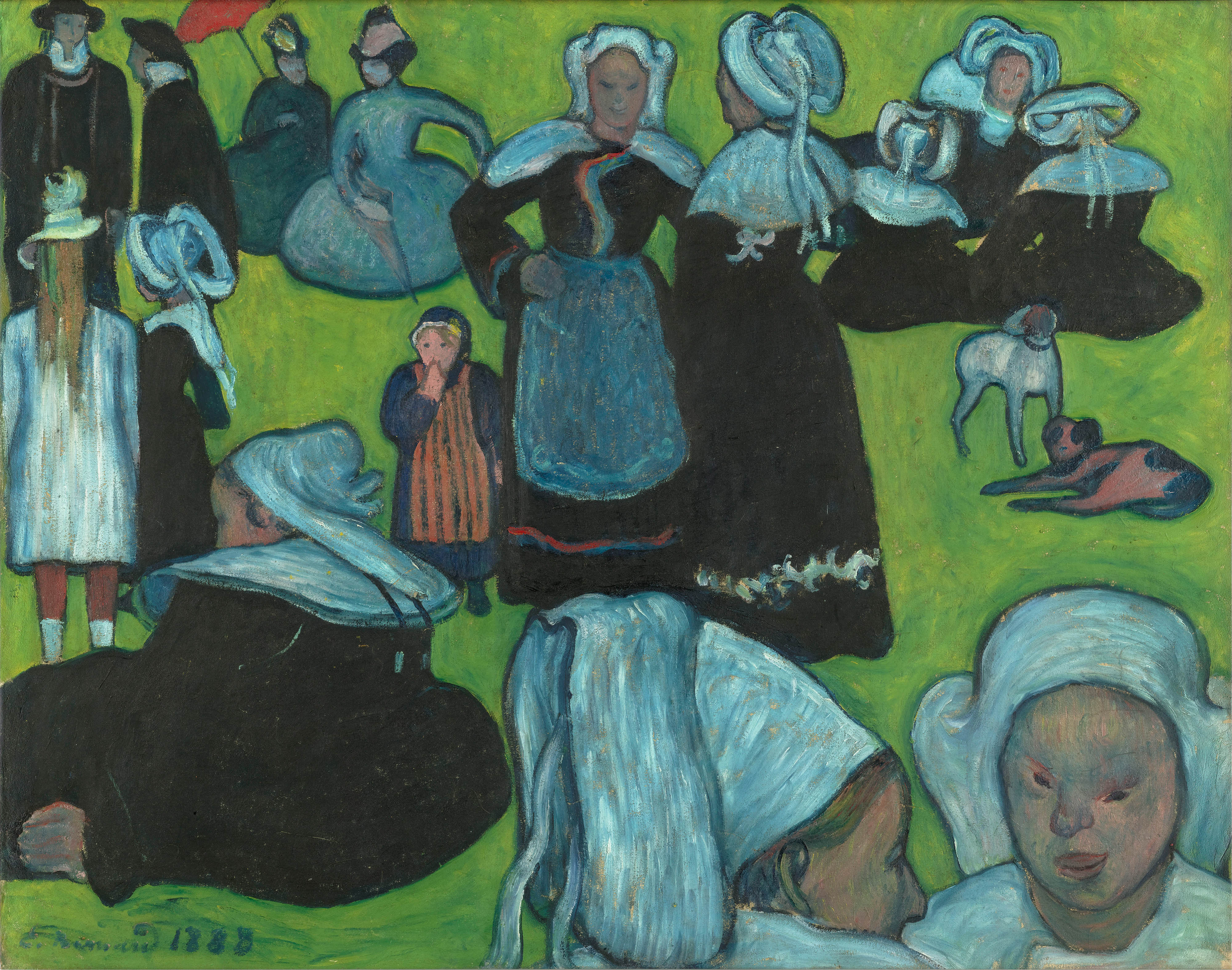
The Pardon by Émile Bernard, August 1888

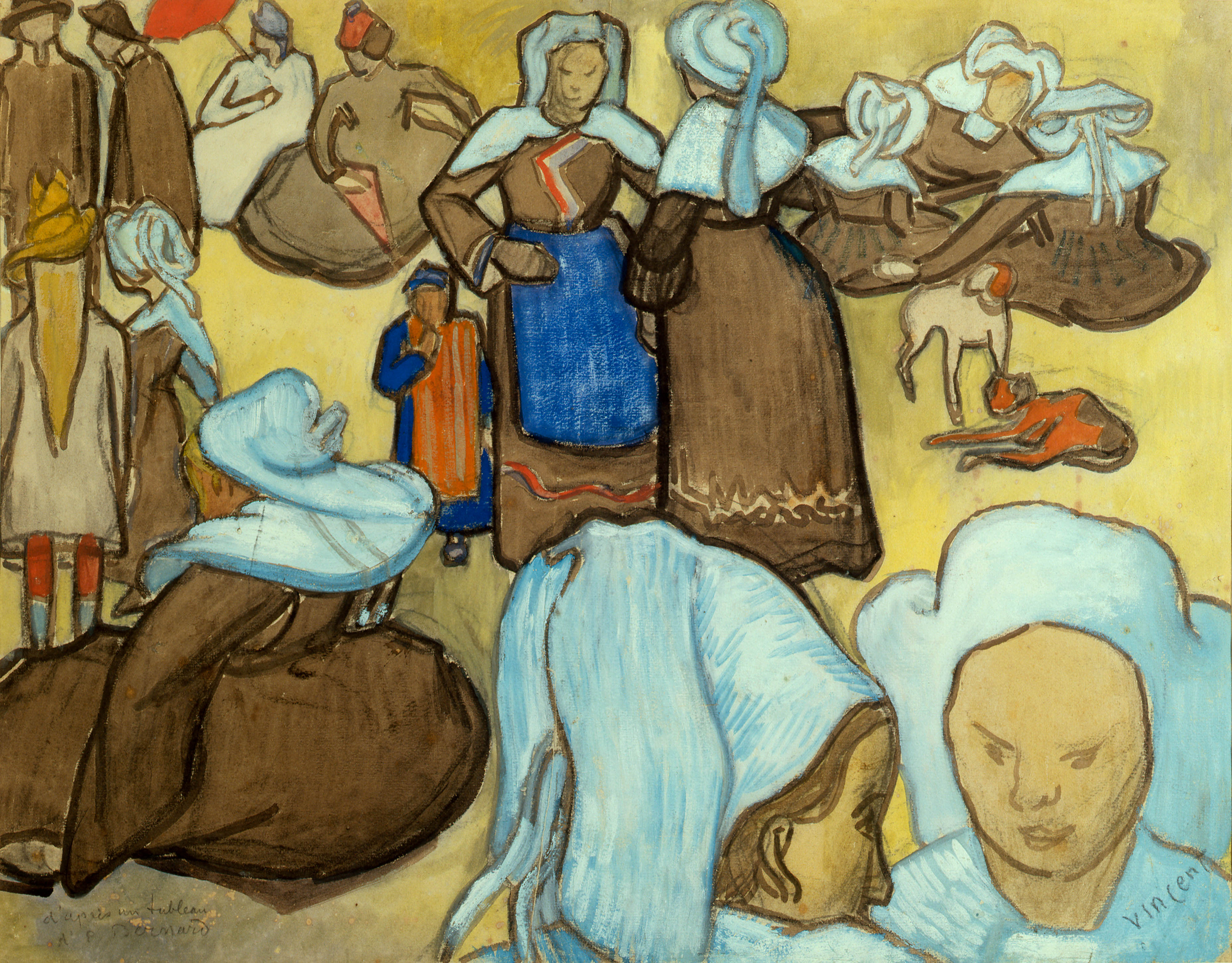
Vincent van Gogh, Breton Women and Children, November 1888, Civica Galleria d'Arte Moderna, Milan, Italy (F1422)

== Copy after Virginie Demont Breton ==
Van Gogh painted a work of the engraving Man at Sea made by Virginie Demont-Breton, daughter of Jules Breton. Her engraving was exhibited at the Salon of 1889. The picture depicts, almost entirely in shades of violet, a peaceful scene of a mother sitting by a fire with her baby on her lap.

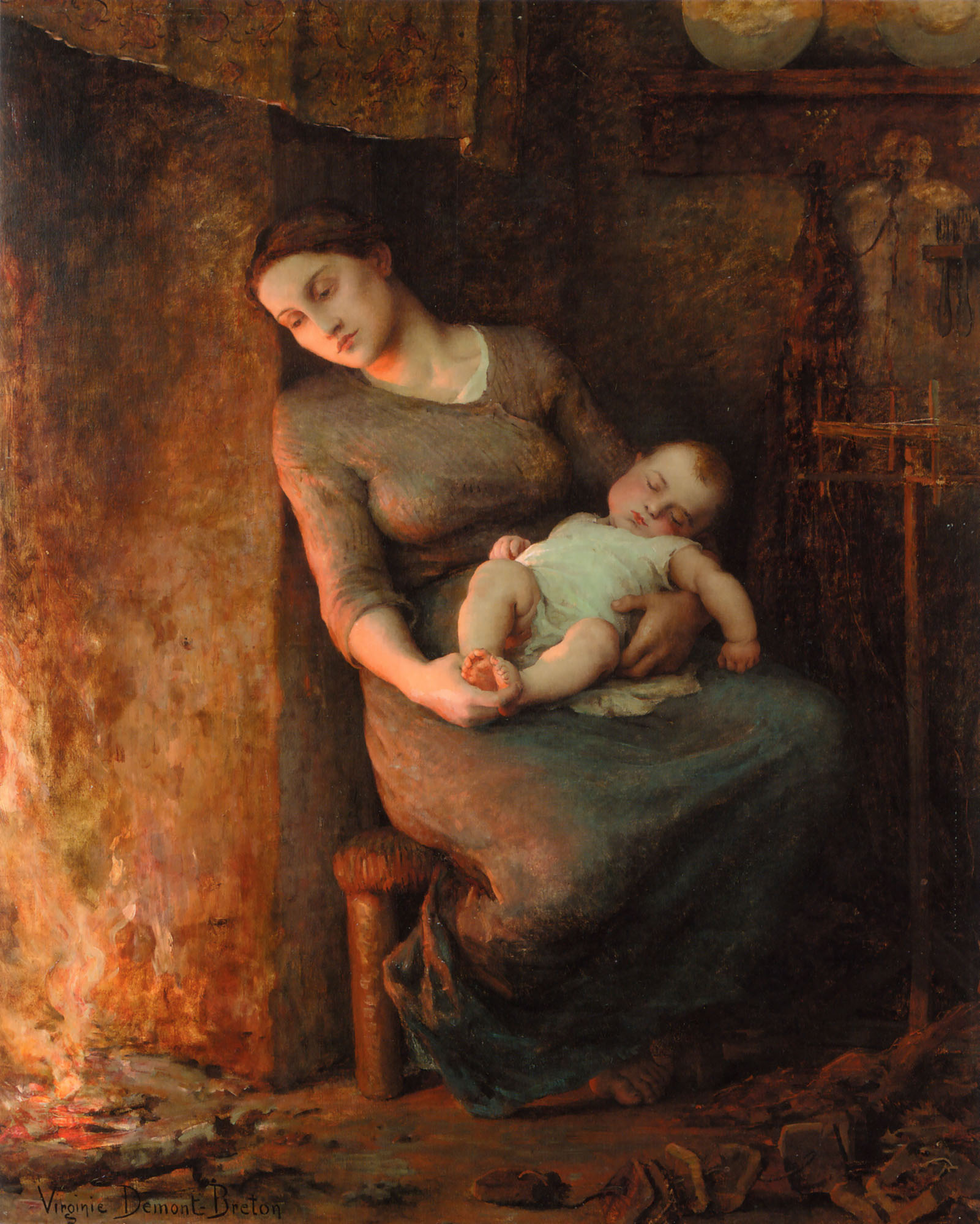
Her Man is at Sea by Virginie Demont-Breton

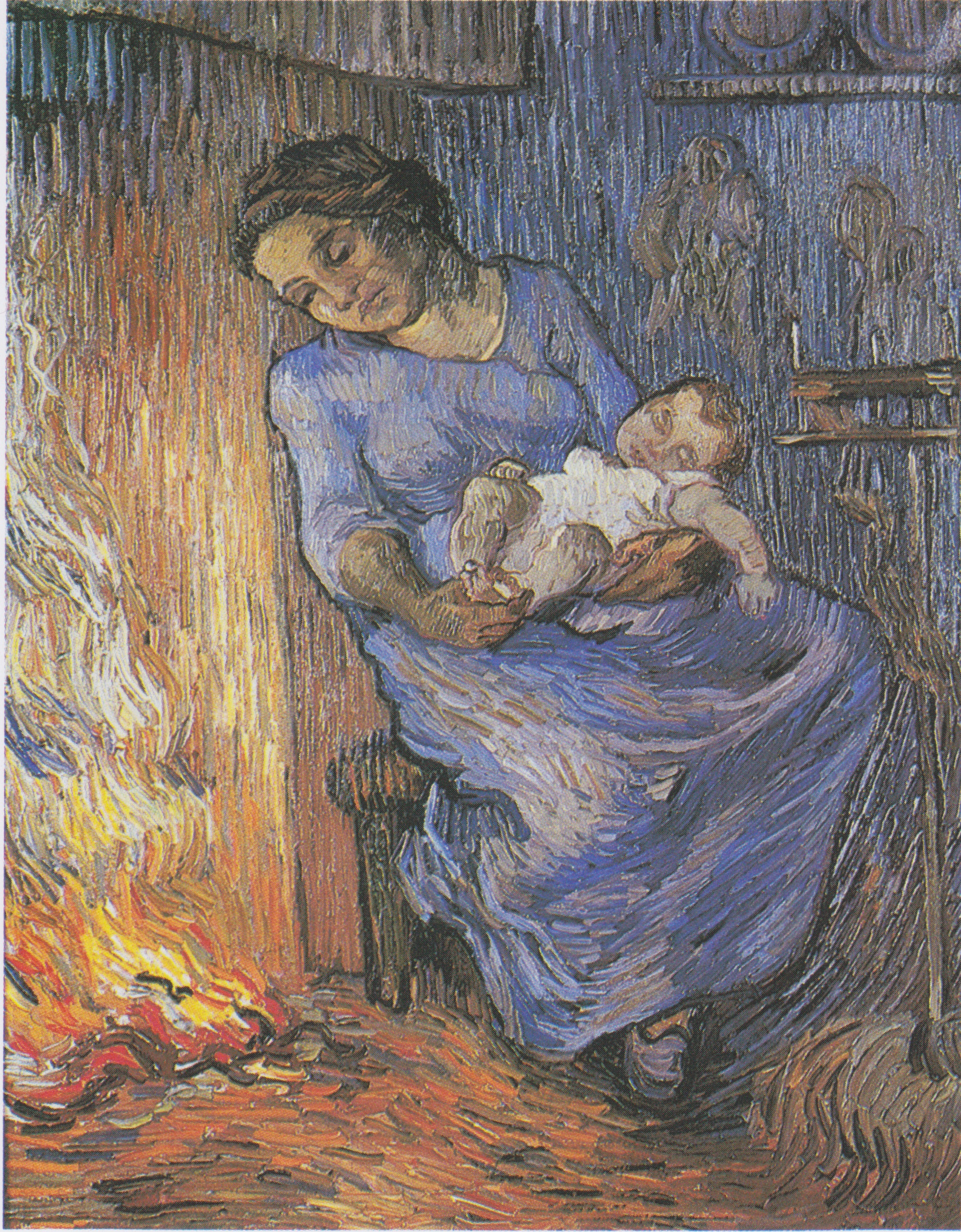
The Man is at Sea (after Demont-Breton), 1889, Private collection (F644)

== Copy after Honoré Daumier ==
In 1882 Van Gogh had remarked that he found Honoré Daumier's The Four Ages of a Drinker both beautiful and soulful.

Van Gogh wrote to his brother Theo of Daumier's artistic perspective and humanity: "What impressed me so much at the time was something so stout and manly in Daumier's conception, something that made me think It must be good to think and to feel like that and to overlook or ignore a multitude of things and to concentrate on what makes us sit up and think and what touches us as human beings more directly and personally than meadows or clouds." Daumier's artistic talents included painting, sculpting and creating lithographs. He was well known for his social and political commentary.

Van Gogh made Men Drinking after Daumier's work in Saint-Remy about February 1890.

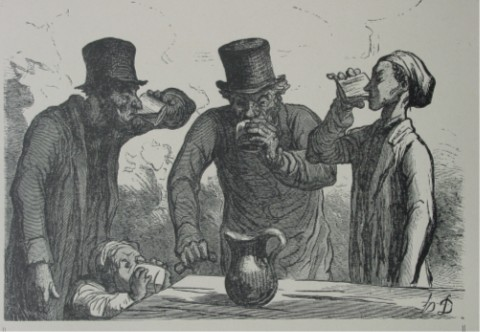
Honoré Daumier, The Drinkers, 1862; from Monde Illustré, 25 October 1862, under the title "Physiologie du buveur, les quatre ages" ("Psychology of drinkers, the four ages")

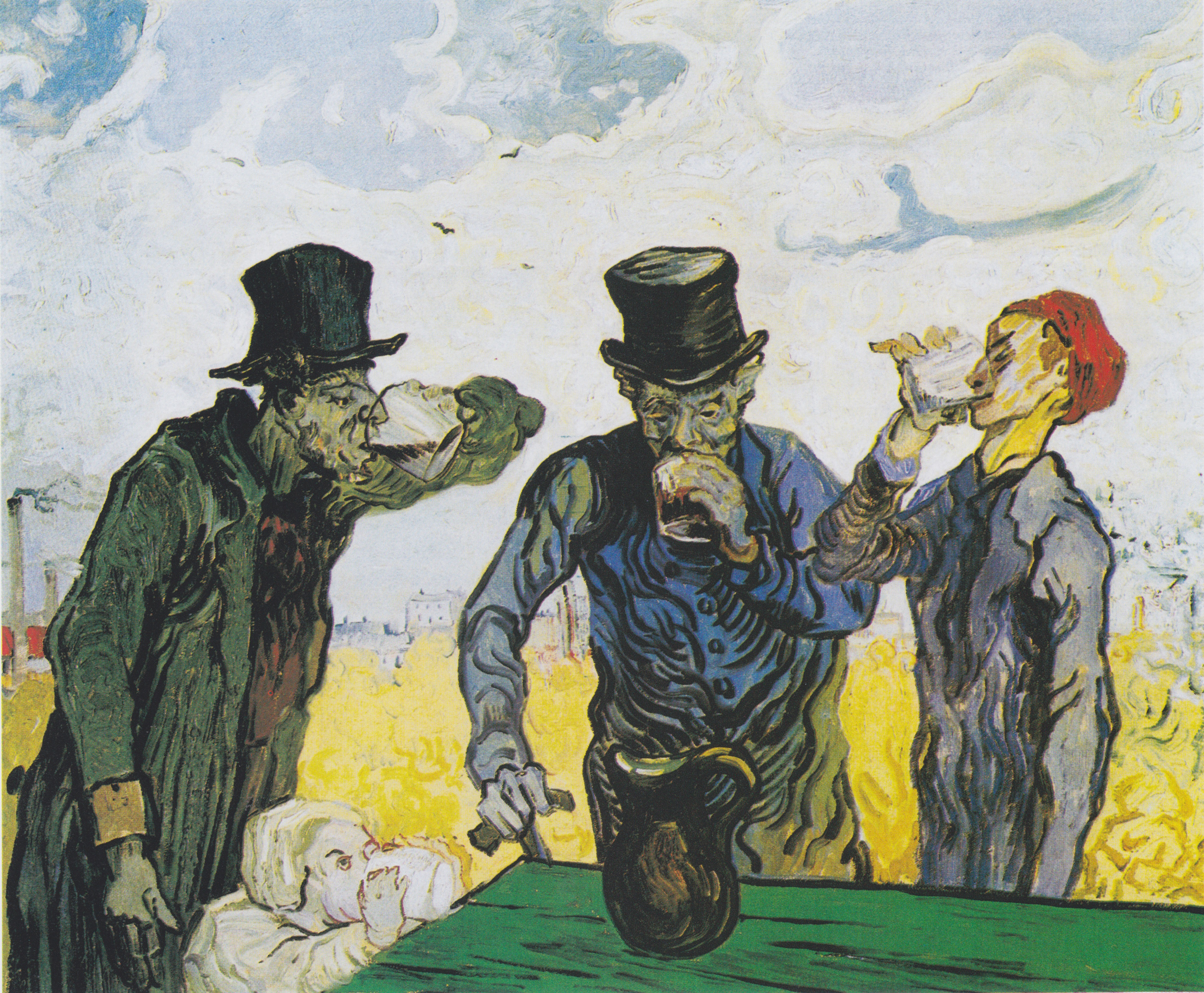
Vincent van Gogh, Men Drinking (after Daumier), 1890, The Art Institute of Chicago, Illinois (F667)

== Copies after Eugène Delacroix ==
=== Background ===
Van Gogh, motivated by the book The Imitation of Christ which included depiction of Christ as a suffering servant, worked on reprises of Eugène Delacroix's Pieta and Good Samaritan. Rather than representing "a triumphant Christ in glory," he depicted Christ in his most perilous and painful period, his crucifixion and death. Of capturing the scenes of his religious work from long ago, Van Gogh described Delacroix's perspective of how to paint the historical religious figures: "Eug. Delacroix, when he did a Gethsemane, had been beforehand to see what an olive grove was like on the spot, and the same for the sea whipped up by a strong mistral, and because he must have said to himself, these people we know from history, doges of Venice, crusaders, apostles, holy women, were of the same type as, and lived in a similar way to, their present-day descendants."

Delacroix's influence helped Van Gogh develop artistically and gain knowledge of color theory. To his brother Theo, he wrote: "What I admire so much about Delacroix... is that he makes us feel the life of things, and the expression of movement, that he absolutely dominates his colours."

=== Table of paintings ===
Van Gogh Image	Name and Details	Comments
	The Good Samaritan (after Delacroix); 1890; Kröller-Müller Museum, Otterlo, Netherlands (F630)	In 1889 Van Gogh expressed a desire to make copies of paintings, including The Good Samaritan by Delacroix as a learning experience.
	The Pietà (after Delacroix), first version 1889; Vatican Collection of Modern Religious Art, Vatican City (F757)	Van Gogh made the Pietà paintings from a lithograph of Delacroix's painting. The subject and composition from the original remain, but Van Gogh brings his own style to the artwork. Of the Pietà, Van Gogh writes: "The Delacroix is a "Pietà" that is to say the dead Christ with the Mater Dolorosa. The exhausted corpse lies on the ground in the entrance of a cave, the hands held before it on the left side, and the woman is behind it. It is in the evening after a thunderstorm, and that forlorn figure in blue clothes - the loose clothes are agitated by the wind - is sharply outlined against a sky in which violet clouds with golden edges are floating. She too stretches out her empty arms before her in a large gesture of despair, and one sees the good sturdy hands of a working woman. The shape of the figure with its streaming clothes is nearly as broad as it is high. And the face of the dead man is in the shadow - but the pale head of the woman stands out clearly against a cloud - a contrast which causes those two heads to seem like one somber-hued flower and one pale flower, arranged in such a way as mutually to intensify the effect."
	The Pietà (after Delacroix); 1889; Van Gogh Museum, Amsterdam, Netherlands (F630)	The Van Gogh Museum relates how Van Gogh hastily began work on the Pietà: "The Delacroix lithograph La Pietà, as well as several others, fell into my oils and paints and was damaged. This upset me terribly, and I am now busy making a painting of it, as you will see." Although stained, the lithograph survived.

== Copy after Gustave Doré ==
Prisoners' Round (after Gustave Doré) was made by Van Gogh at Saint-Paul asylum in Saint-Rémy. This work like the reprises of Eugène Delacroix and Rembrandt's works, evokes Van Gogh's sense of isolation, like an imprisoned or dying man. Although sad, there is a sense of comfort offered. In a letter to his brother, Theo, Van Gogh mentioned that he found making it and Men Drinking (after Daumier) quite difficult.

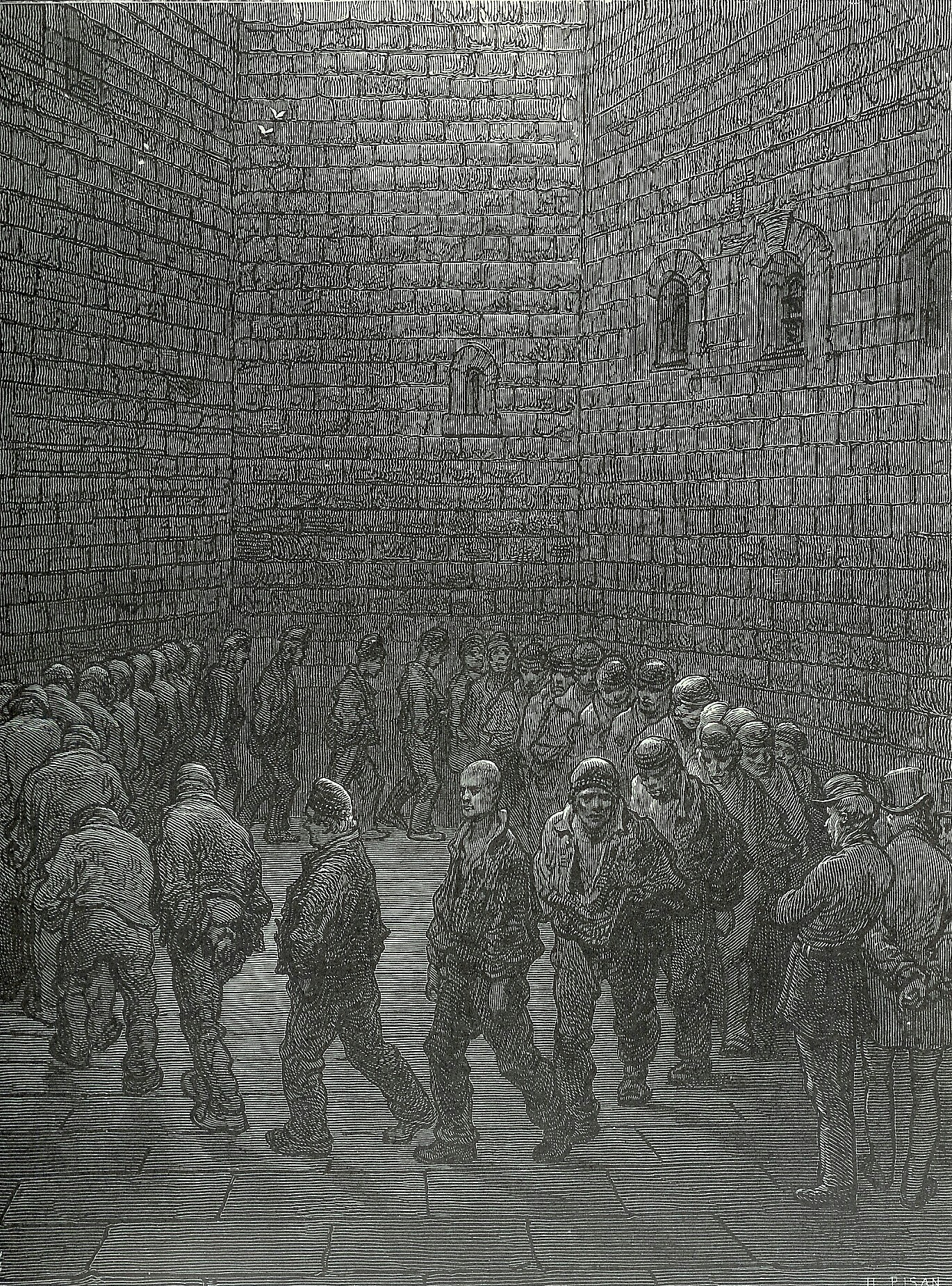
Gustave Doré, Newgate Exercise yard, from London: A Pilgrimage by Gustave Doré and Blanchard Jerrold, 1872

Vincent van Gogh, Prisoners' Round (after Gustave Doré), 1890, Pushkin Museum, Moscow, Russia (F669)

Following Van Gogh's funeral, Émile Bernard wrote of the studies around his coffin: "On the walls of the room where his body was laid out all his last canvases were hung making a sort of halo for him and the brilliance of the genius that radiated from them made this death even more painful for us artists who were there." Of the Doré reprise, he said, "Convicts walking in a circle surrounded by high prison walls, a canvas inspired by Doré of a terrifying ferocity and which is also symbolic of his end. Wasn't life like that for him, a high prison like this with such high walls - so high…and these people walking endlessly round this pit, weren't they the poor artists, the poor damned souls walking past under the whip of Destiny?"

== Copy after Keisai Eisen ==
While living in Antwerp Van Gogh become acquainted with Japanese wood block prints. In Paris, Keisai Eisen's print appeared on the May 1886 cover of Paris Illustré magazine which inspired Van Gogh to make The Courtesan. The magazine issue was entirely devoted to Japan. Japanese author, Tadamasa Hayashi, who lived in Paris, acquainted Parisians with information about Japan. In addition to providing information about its history, climate and visual arts, Hayashi explained what it was like to live in Japan, such as its customs, religion, education, religion, and the nature of its people.

Van Gogh copied and enlarged the image. He created a bright yellow background and colorful kimono. Influenced by other Japanese prints, he added a "watery landscape" of bamboo and water lilies. Frogs and cranes, terms used in 19th century France for prostitutes, with a distance boat adorn the border.

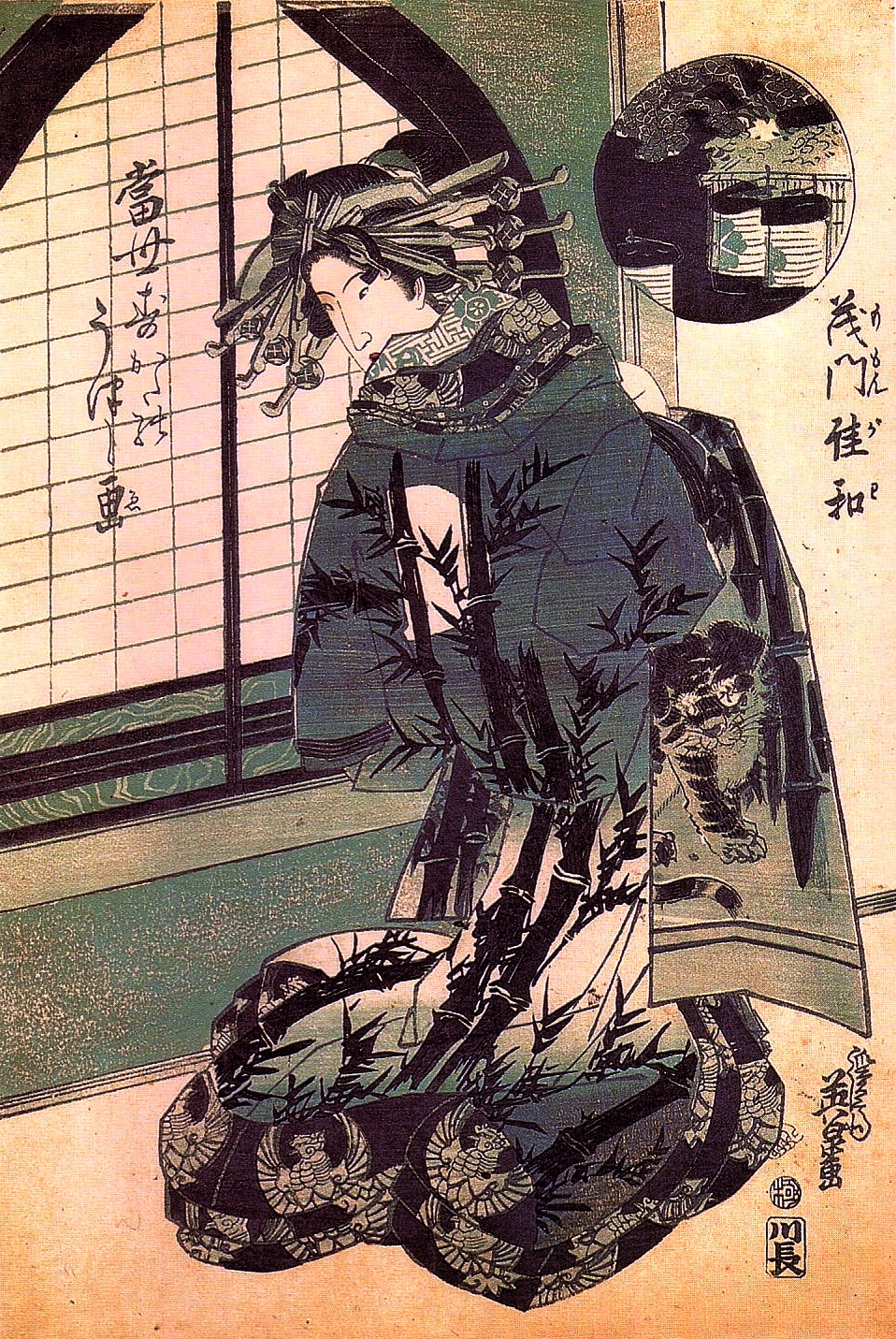
A courtesan, Nishiki-e, by Keisai Eisen

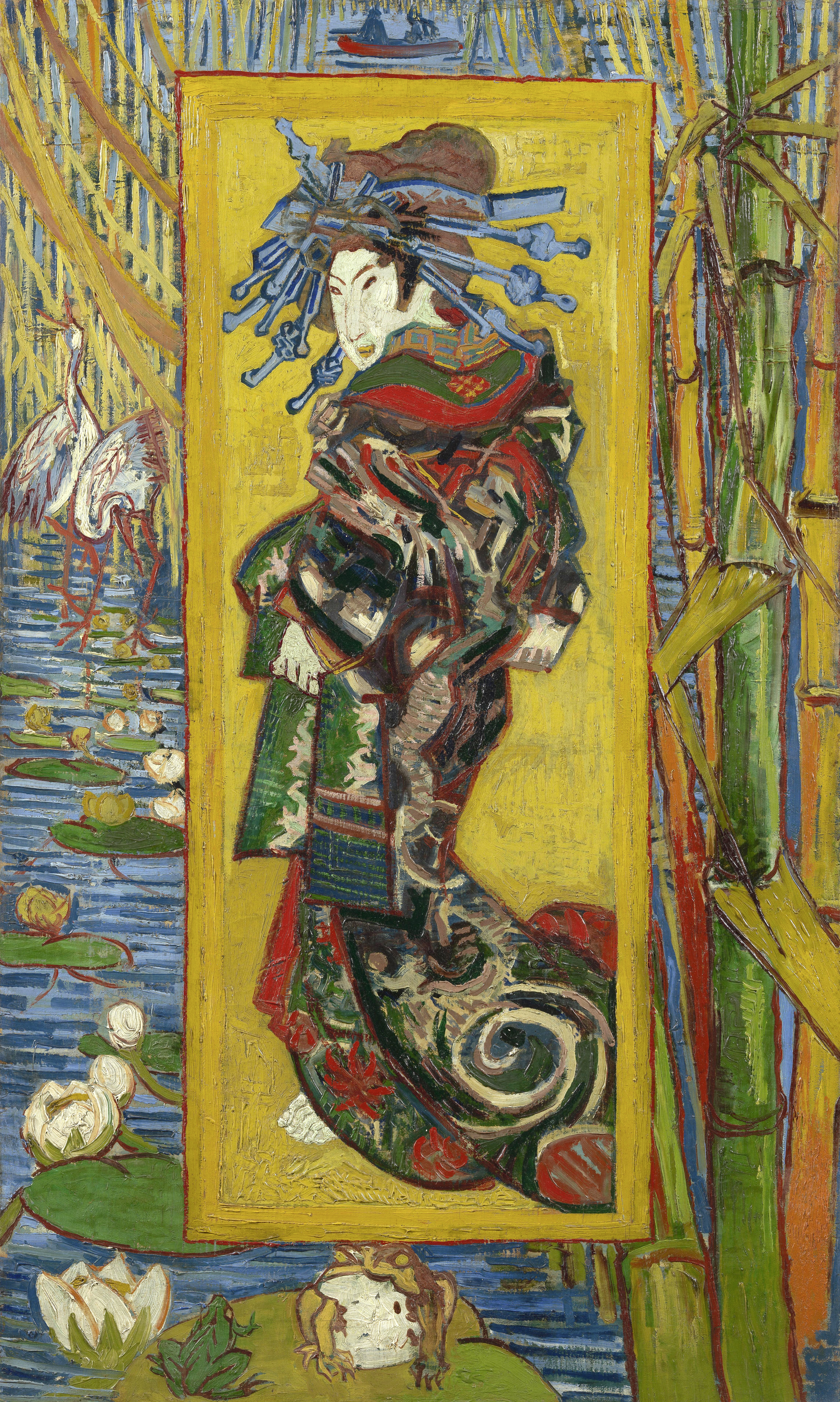
The Courtesan (after Eisen) by Vincent van Gogh, 1887, Van Gogh Museum, Amsterdam (F373)

== Copies after Utagawa Hiroshige ==
In the mid-19th century Japan opened itself to trade, making Japanese art available to the west. The works of Japanese print makers, Hiroshige and Hokusai greatly influenced Van Gogh, both for the beautiful subject matter and the style of flat patterns of colors, without shadow. Van Gogh collected hundreds of Japanese prints and likened the works of the great Japanese artists, like Hiroshige, to those of Rembrandt, Hals, and Vermeer. Van Gogh explored the various influences, molding them into a style that was uniquely his own. The Japanese paintings represent Van Gogh's search for serenity, which he describes in a letter to his sister during this period, "Having as much of this serenity as possible, even though one knows little – nothing – for certain, is perhaps a better remedy for all diseases than all the things that are sold at the chemist's shop."

Hiroshige, one of the last great masters of Ukiyo-e, was well known for series of prints of famous Japanese landmarks.

=== Japonaiserie: Flowering Plum Tree (after Hiroshige) ===
The Flowering Plum Tree is believed to be the first of three oil paintings made by Van Gogh of Utagawa Hiroshige's Japanese woodblock prints. He used color to emulate the effect of the printer's ink, such as the red and greens in the background and the tint of green on the white blossoms. After he moved to Arles, Van Gogh wrote to his sister that he no longer needed to dream of going to Japan, "because I am always telling myself that here I am in Japan."

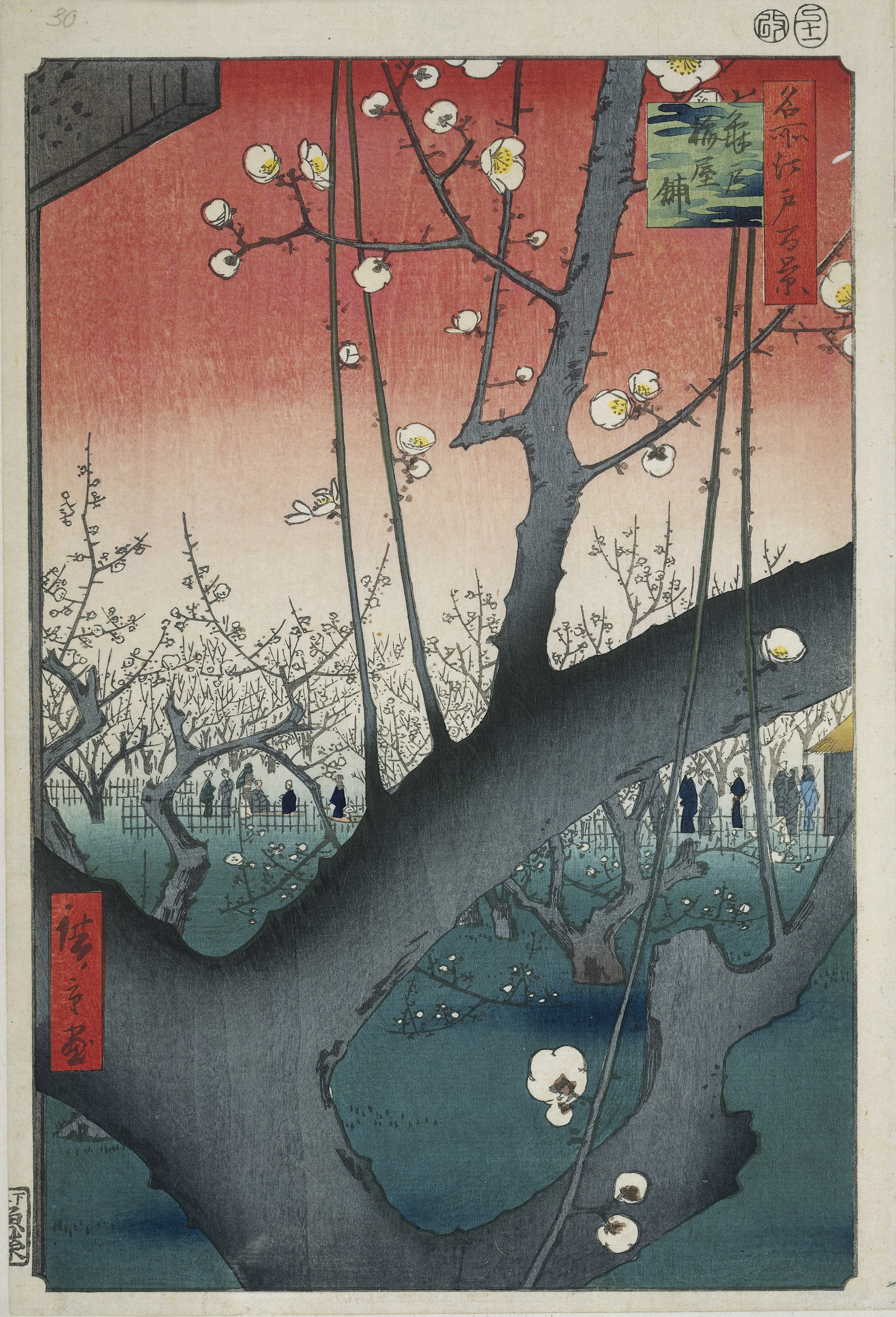
The Plum Orchard In Kameido by Hiroshige

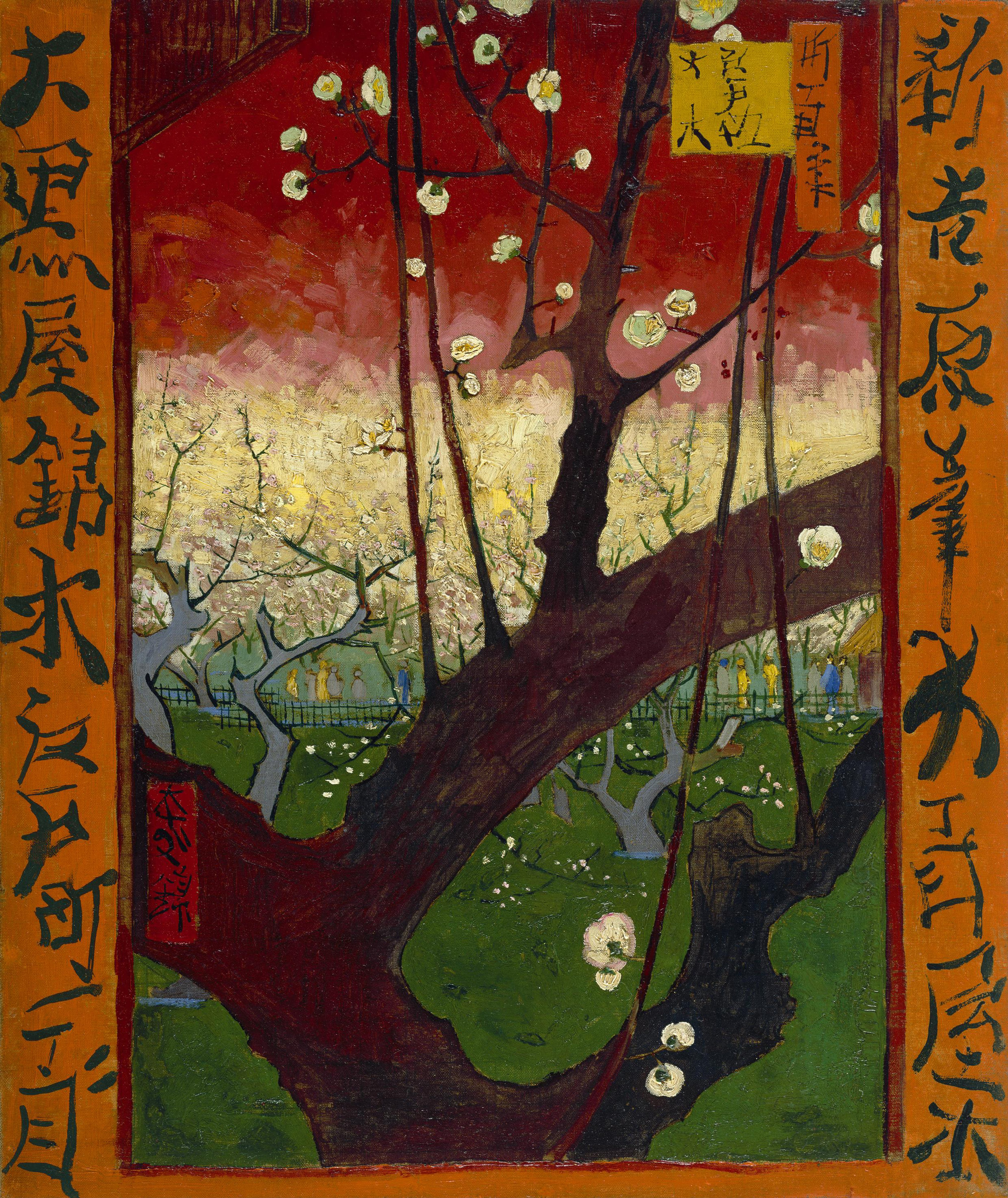
Japonaiserie: Flowering Plum Tree (after Hiroshige), by Vincent van Gogh, 1887, Van Gogh Museum, Amsterdam (F371)

=== Japonaiserie: Bridge in the Rain (after Hiroshige) ===
Utagawa Hiroshige's Evening Shower at Atake and the Great Bridge woodcut, which he had in his collection, inspired Van Gogh for its simplicity. The cloudburst, for instance, is conveyed by parallel lines. Such techniques were revered, but also difficult to execute when creating the wood block stamp for printing. By making a painting, Van Gogh's brushstrokes "softened the boldness of the Japanese woodcut." Calligraphic figures, borrowed from other Japanese prints, fill the border around the image. Rather than following the color patterns of the original woodcut print, he used bright colors or contrasting colors.

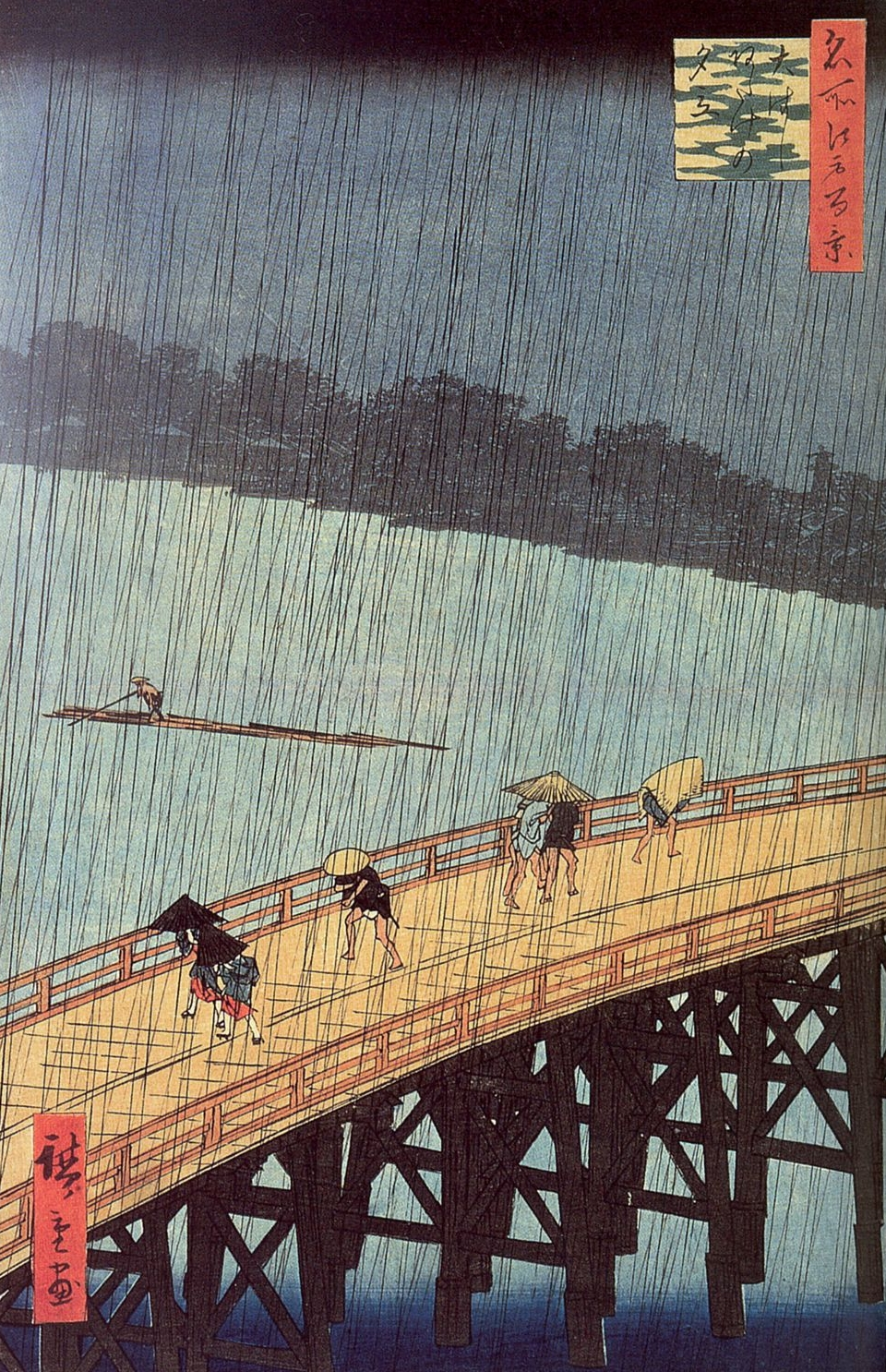
Evening Shower at Atake and the Great Bridge, by Hiroshige

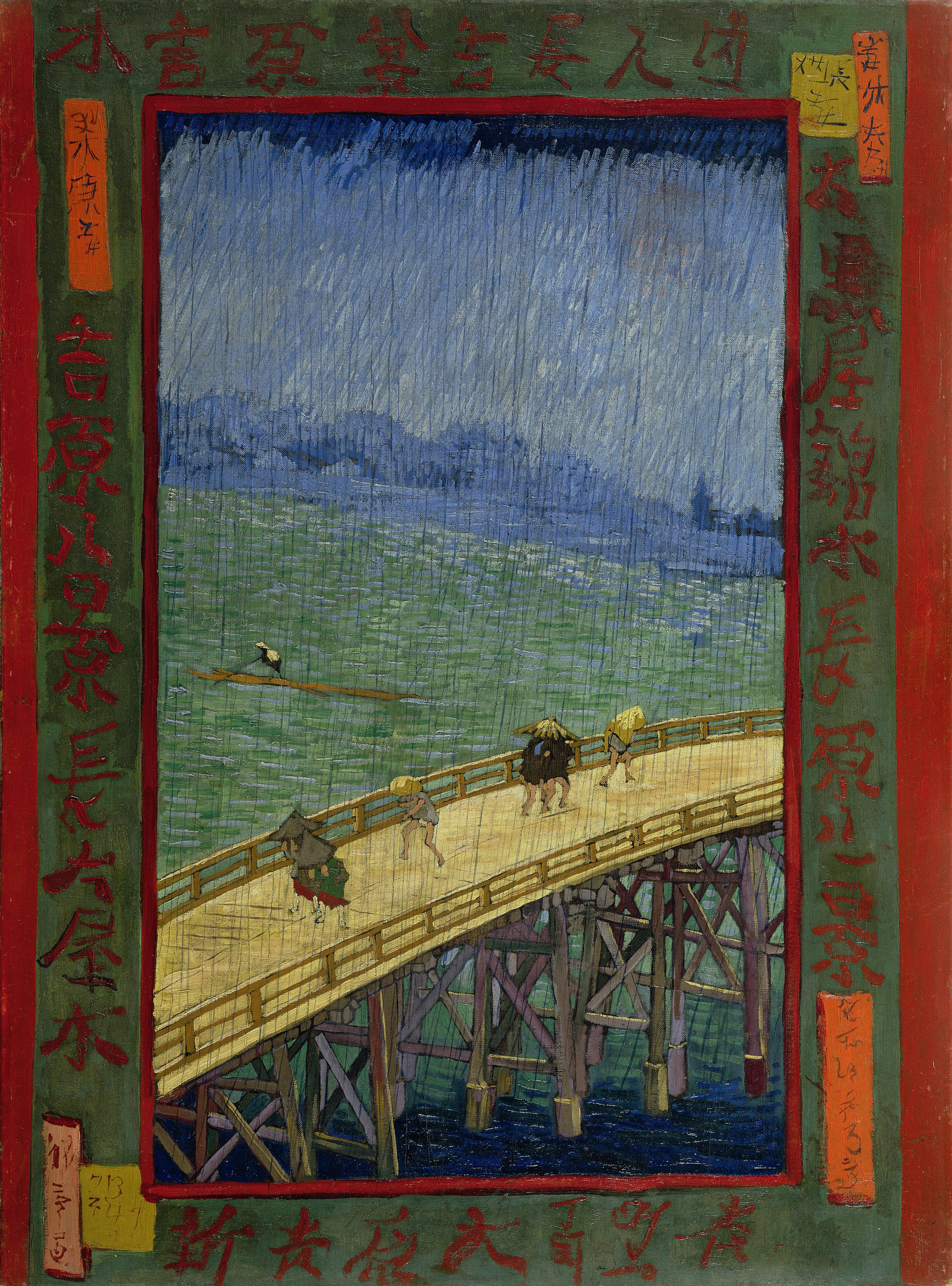
Japonaiserie: Bridge in the Rain (after Hiroshige), by Vincent van Gogh, 1887, Van Gogh Museum, Amsterdam (F372)

== Copy after Jacob Jordaens ==
Van Gogh used Jordaen's subject and composition for his rendition of Cows. A later artist, Edward Hopper, also used Jordaen's Cows as a source of inspiration for his work. The painting is located at the Musée des Beaux-Arts de Lille in France. Jan Hulsker notes that the painting is a color study of an etching Dr. Gachet made of Jordaen's painting.

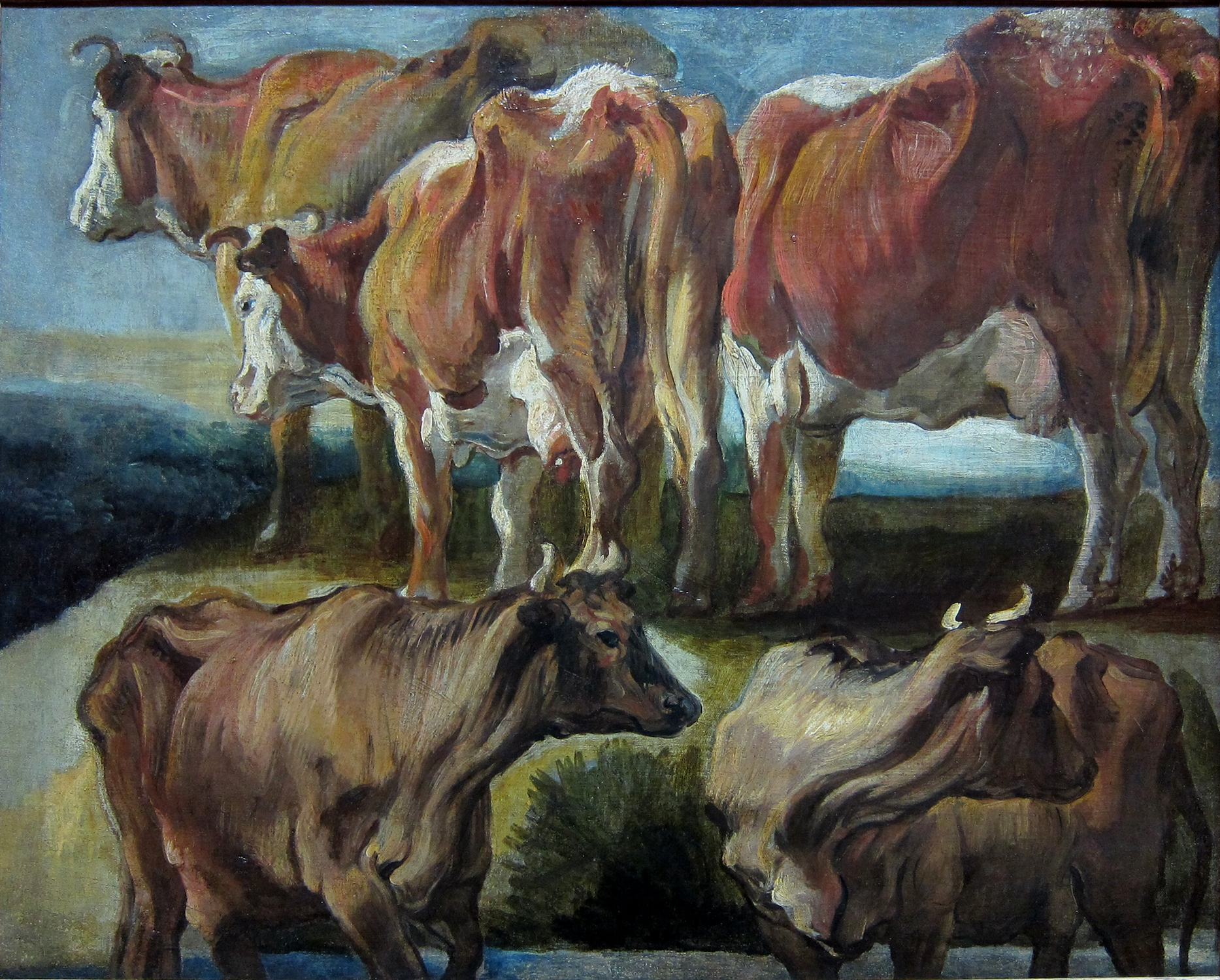
Cows, Jordaens

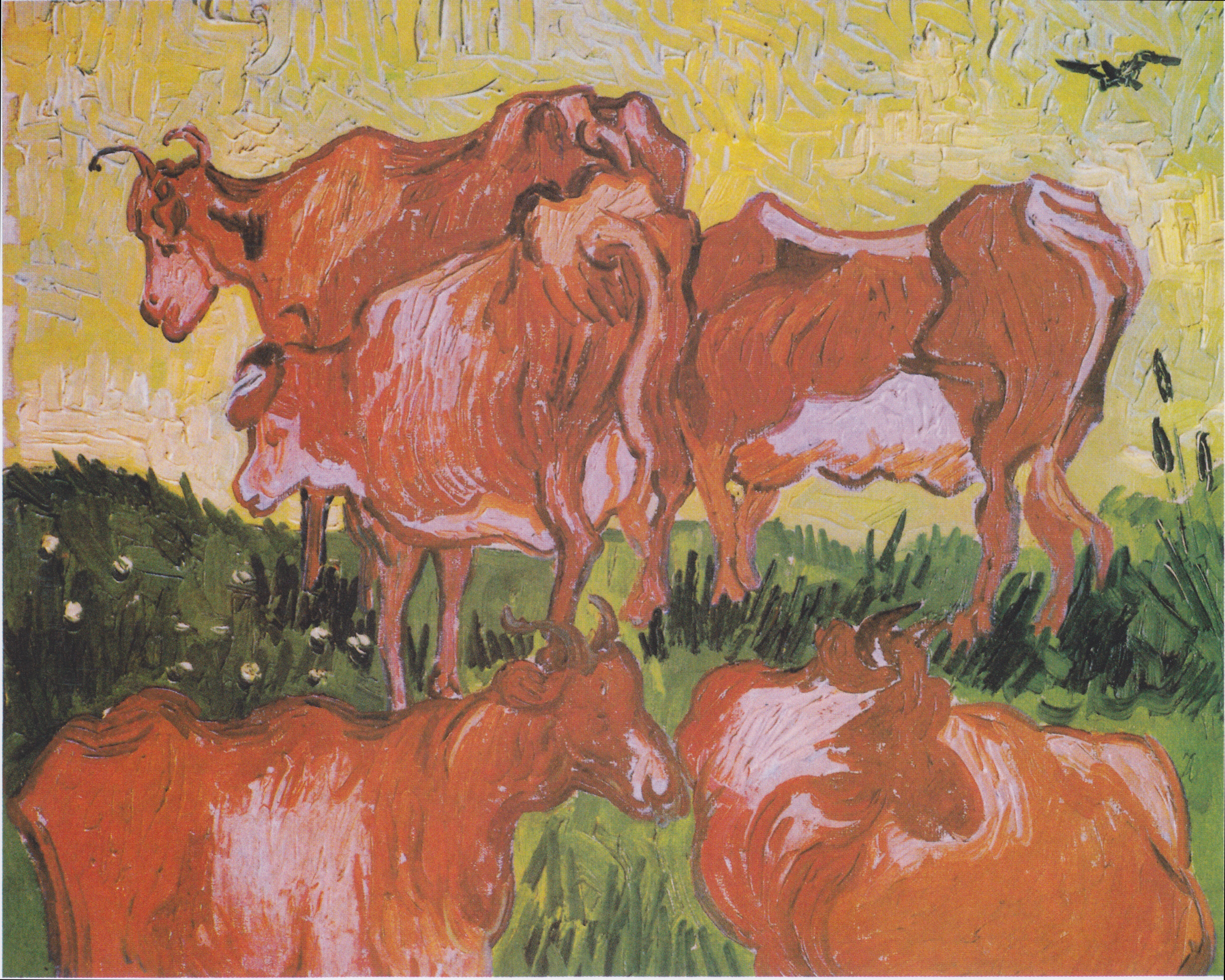
Cows (after Jordaens), 1890, Palais des Beaux-Arts de Lille, Lille, France (F822, JH2095)

== Copies after Jean-François Millet ==
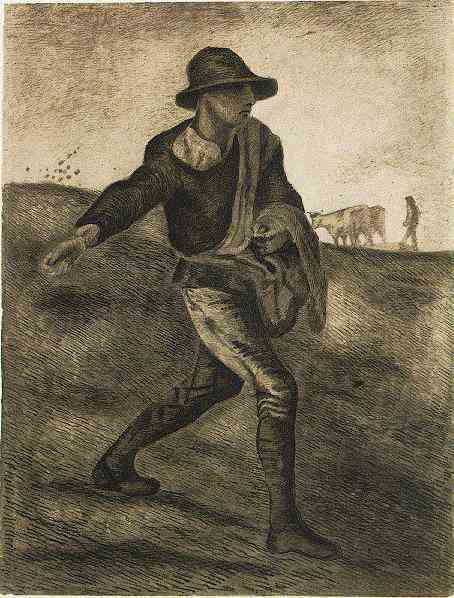
Vincent van Gogh, The Sower (after Millet), 1881, drawing, Van Gogh Museum, Amsterdam (F830)

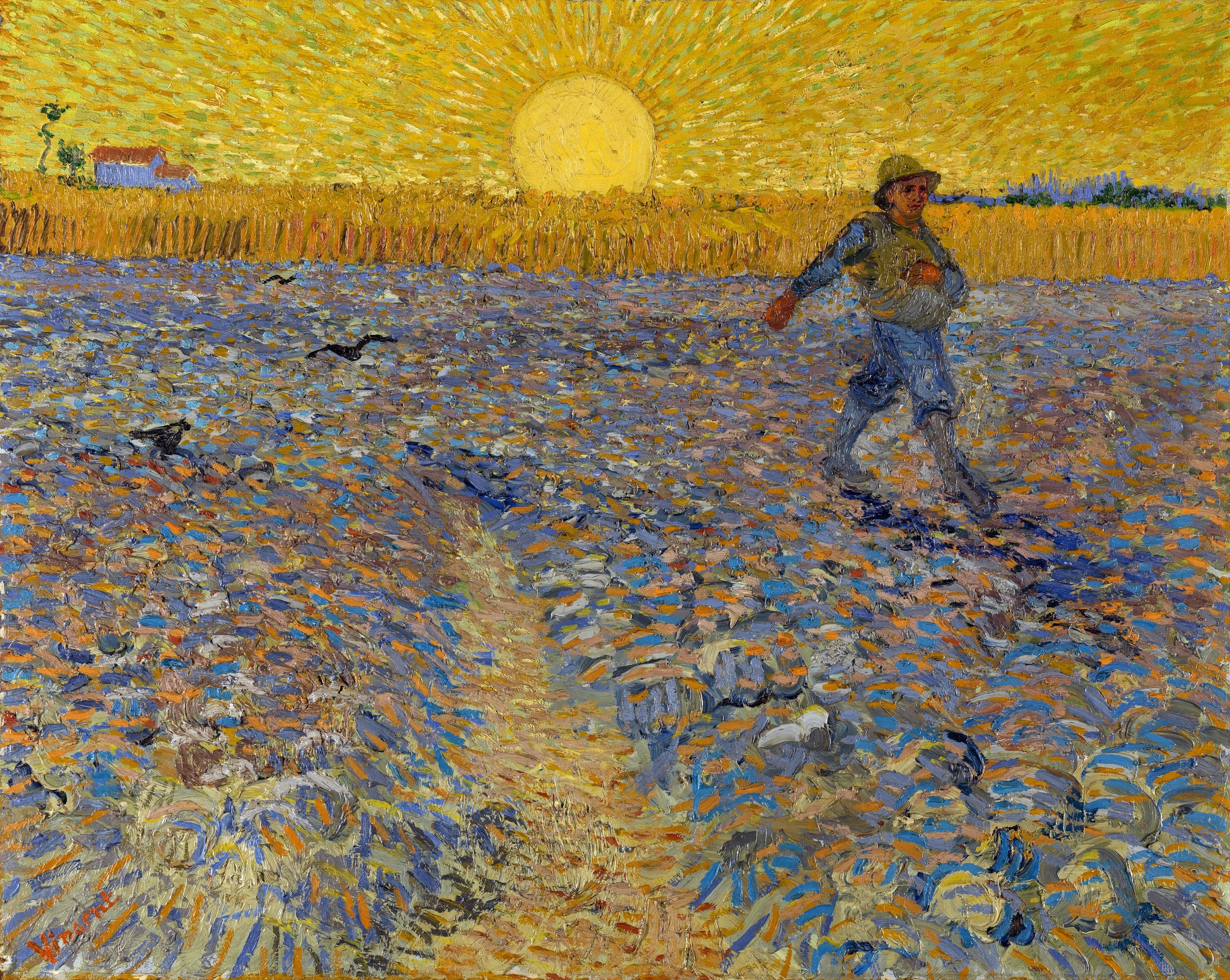
Vincent van Gogh, The Sower, Arles, June 1888, Kröller-Müller Museum, Otterlo

=== Background ===
The "peasant genre" that greatly influenced Van Gogh began in the 1840s with the works of Jean-François Millet, Jules Breton, and others. In 1885 Van Gogh described the painting of peasants as the most essential contribution to modern art. He described the works of Millet and Breton of religious significance, "something on high." A common denominator in his favored authors and artists was sentimental treatment of the destitute and downtrodden. He held laborers up to a high standard of how dedicatedly he should approach painting, "One must undertake with confidence, with a certain assurance that one is doing a reasonable thing, like the farmer who drives his plow... (one who) drags the harrow behind himself. If one hasn't a horse, one is one's own horse." Referring to painting of peasants Van Gogh wrote to his brother Theo: "How shall I ever manage to paint what I love so much?"

Van Gogh Museum says of Millet's influence on Van Gogh: "Millet's paintings, with their unprecedented depictions of peasants and their labors, mark a turning point in 19th-century art. Before Millet, peasant figures were just one of many elements in picturesque or nostalgic scenes. In Millet's work, individual men and women became heroic and real. Millet was the only major artist of the Barbizon School who was not interested in 'pure' landscape painting."

Van Gogh made twenty-one paintings in Saint-Rémy that were "translations" of the work of Jean-François Millet. Van Gogh did not intend for his works to be literal copies of the originals. Speaking specifically of the works after Millet, he explained, "it's not copying pure and simple that one would be doing. It is rather translating into another language, the one of colors, the impressions of chiaroscuro and white and black." He made a copy of The Gleaners (Des glaneuses) by Millet.

Theo wrote Van Gogh: "The copies after Millet are perhaps the best things you have done yet, and induce me to believe that on the day you turn to painting compositions of figures, we may look forward to great surprises."

=== Table of paintings ===
Millet Image	Van Gogh Image	Comments
Morning: Going to Work ca. 1858-60; Van Gogh Museum, Amsterdam, Netherlands	Morning: Peasant Couple Going to Work; 1890; Hermitage Museum, St. Petersburg, Russia (F684)	Millet created a series of woodcuts entitled The Four Hours of the Day (1860). This idea is reportedly derived from the medieval "Book of Hours" that held that rural life was structured by the rhythms of God and nature. In this work, the man and woman walk to the fields, silhouetted by the morning sun. The simple composition depicts the harshness of their lives. Van Gogh said of Millet's work, "they seem to have been painted with the very earth they were going to till."
Noon: Rest; 1866; Museum of Fine Arts, Boston	The Siesta or Noon - Rest from Work; 1890; Musée d'Orsay, Paris, France (F686)	While remaining true to Millet's composition, Van Gogh uses color to depict the peaceful nature of the mid-day rest. Use of contrasting colors, blue-violet against yellow-orange brings an intensity to the work that is uniquely his style.
The End of the Day; 1867-69; Memorial Art Gallery of the University of Rochester, Rochester	Man in a Field or Evening, the End of the Day; November 1889; Menard Art Museum, Komaki, Japan (F649)	In this work the farmer ends his day against the background of an evening sky. Van Gogh painted vivid colors of yellow and violet in his unique pointillistic style. While he brands the work with his own style, he remains true to Millet's composition.
Night; 1867; Fine Arts Museum, Boston	Evening Hours (after Milliet); October 1889; Van Gogh Museum, Amsterdam (F647)	The work depicts happy life of a rural family: father, mother and child. Here the image seems bathed in yellow light like that of the Holy Family. A lamp casts long shadows of many colors on the floor of the humble cottage. The painting includes soft shades of green and purple. The work was based on a print by Millet from his series, the four times of day.
First Steps ca. 1858; Lauren Rogers Museum of Art, Laurel, Mississippi	First Steps; 1890; The Metropolitan Museum of Art, New York (F668)	Van Gogh used a photograph of the original painting for this work. Rather than vibrant colors, here he used softer shades of yellow, green and blue. The picture depicts the father, having put down his tools, holding his arms outstretched for his child's first steps. The mother protectively guides the child's movement.
The Sower; 1850; Museum of Fine Arts, Boston	The Sower; 1889; Niarchos Collection, Zurich (F690)	Having made over 30 works of the sower, Van Gogh explored the symbolism of sowing: "One does not expect to get from life what one has already learned it cannot give; rather, one begins to see more clearly that life is a kind of sowing time, and the harvest is not yet here." As the sower cast seeds, another farmer is seen in a nearby field ploughing the field. Van Gogh depicted the sower in "its simplest form" and with the colors of blue, red, yellow, purple and orange, giving life and meaning to the composition of the eternal cycles of life.
The Sower; 1850; Museum of Fine Arts, Boston	The Sower; 1889; Kroller-Muller Museum (F689)	Van Gogh's appreciation for Millet's work stemmed from the soulfulness he brought to the works, specifically honoring peasants' agricultural role. Plowing, sowing, and harvesting were seen by Van Gogh as symbols for man's command of nature and its eternal cycles of life. Kay Larson of New York Magazine wrote of Millet's work: The Sower, who strides like an elemental force of nature across the cold, newly broken earth, is such an icon that Simon & Schuster uses it as a logo."
	The Reaper; 1889; Private Collection (F688)	In man's mastery of the cycles of nature: "the sower and the wheat sheaf stood for eternity, and the reaper and his scythe for irrevocable death." Of the reaper Van Gogh expressed his symbolic, spiritual view of those who worked close to nature in a letter to his sister in 1889: "aren’t we, who live on bread, to a considerable extent like wheat, at least aren't we forced to submit to growing like a plant without the power to move, by which I mean in whatever way our imagination impels us, and to being reaped when we are ripe, like the same wheat?" Van Gogh spoke of the symbolic meaning of the reaper: "For I see in this reaper — a vague figure fighting like a devil in the midst of the heat to get to the end of his task — I see in him the image of death, in the sense that humanity might be the wheat he is reaping. So it is — if you like — the opposite of that sower I tried to do before. But there is nothing sad in this death, it goes its way in broad daylight with sun flooding everything with a light of pure gold."
	The Reaper with a Sickle; 1889; Van Gogh Museum, Amsterdam, Netherlands (F687)	Of making this painting, and others of Millet's Work in the Field series, Van Gogh mentioned that absent models, he was pleased to have seven of the ten in the series completed.
	Peasant Woman with a Rake; 1889; Private collection (F698)	
	Peasant Woman Binding Sheaves; 1889; Van Gogh Museum, Amsterdam, Netherlands (F700)	In Peasant Woman Binding Sheaves (after Millet) Van Gogh's work shows it is beautiful for its simplicity and appreciation of nature. The woman's expression is hidden to us and appears like one of the waiting bundles of wheat. The true focus of the scene is the woman's bent back.
	The Sheaf-Binder; 1889; Van Gogh Museum, Amsterdam, Netherlands (F693)	
	Peasant Woman Cutting Straw; 1889; Van Gogh Museum, Amsterdam (F697)	
	The Thresher; 1889; Van Gogh Museum, Amsterdam, Netherlands (F692)	
Two Men Turning Over the Soil; 1866; Museum of Fine Arts, Boston	Two Peasants Digging; 1889; The Stedelijk Museum, Amsterdam, Netherlands (F648)	
The Woodcutter ca. 1853; Musée du Louvre, Paris	The Woodcutter; 1890; Van Gogh Museum, Amsterdam (F670)	
Shearing Sheep ca. 1852-53; Museum of Fine Art, Boston	The Sheep-Shearers; 1889; Van Gogh Museum, Amsterdam, Netherlands (F634)	
La grande bergère assise Woodcut, c. 1874; Various collections	The Shepherdess; 1889; Tel Aviv Museum of Art, Israel (F699)	The source was a woodcut (27.3 x 21.9 cm) by Jean-Baptise Millet after his brother Jean-François Millet. Its strong contour line was the inspiration for Vincent van Gogh's Sorrow.
	Woman Spinning; 1889; Collection Sara and Moshe Mayer, Tel Aviv Museum of Art, Israel (F696)	
Winter: The Plain of Chailly; 1862; Osterreichische Gallerie, Vienna	Snow covered Field with a Harrow or Plough and the Harrow; January, 1890; Van Gogh Museum, Amsterdam, Netherlands (F632)	Van Gogh used Millet's work, and Alfred Delaunay's etching of Millet's work, as inspiration for this painting. In Van Gogh's version he added black crows and made the winter scene more bleak, deserted and cold. His choice of color, composition and brushstroke make this work uniquely his own.
	Two Peasant Women Digging in the Snow; April, 1890; Foundation E.G. Bührle, Zurich, Switzerland (F695)	Van Gogh used the women from Millet's The Gleaners as inspiration for this painting of women digging in the frozen snow. Unlike the others, this work is not a literal translation of the original painting. The setting sun casts a warm glow over the fields of snow. The cool colors of the field contrast to the red in the sun and sky. Jan Hulsker places the painting as one of van Gogh's "reminisces of the North".

== Copy after Michael Ancher ==
In 2016, a painting was purchased for less than $50 at a garage sale in Minnesota, bearing the inscription 'Elimar'. From 2020 to 2025, the work went under investigation by a team of around 20 experts commissioned by the art research firm LMI Group International, and multiple pieces of evidence have been put forward to prove the work's authenticity; analyzation of the canvas weave, radiocarbon dating, paint pigments and overall characteristics of the style. A strand of red human hair was even found embedded in the canvas and was sent to be analyzed. Despite the fact that it came from a human male, efforts to compare its DNA to that of Van Gogh's descendants ultimately failed due to its reportedly "degraded state", as stated by LMI. This research has also given experts the ability to date the work, which was in 1889, during Van Gogh's time at the Saint-Paul Asylum in Saint-Rémy.

The LMI Group later stated that the work (now referred to as 'Elimar', using the inscription in the bottom right corner) was based on a portrait by Michael Ancher, therefore adding to Van Gogh's considerable list of "translations" of other artists' works (notably Paul Gauguin, Émile Bernard and Jean-François Millet). According to research by the LMI Group, the ‘Elimar’ inscription on the Van Gogh painting is a reference by Vincent Van Gogh to a fisherman character in one of Hans Christian Andersen’s books of which Van Gogh was known to have read, and not the signature of the Danish Amateur painter Henning Elimar (based on material science and data, inscription measurements, stylistic and other documented in-congruencies).

== Copies after Rembrandt ==
From Rembrandt, Van Gogh learned how to paint light into darkness. Rembrandt's influence seemed present one evening in 1877 when Van Gogh walked through Amsterdam. He wrote: "the ground was dark, the sky still lit by the glow of the sun, already gone down, the row of houses and towers standing out above, the lights in the windows everywhere, everything reflected in the water." Van Gogh found Rembrandt particularly adept at his observation of nature and expressing emotion with great tenderness.

It's not clear if Van Gogh was copying after particular Rembrandt works for his copies or the spirit of the figures he portrayed. Examples of Rembrandt's angels and Lazarus are here for illustrative purposes.

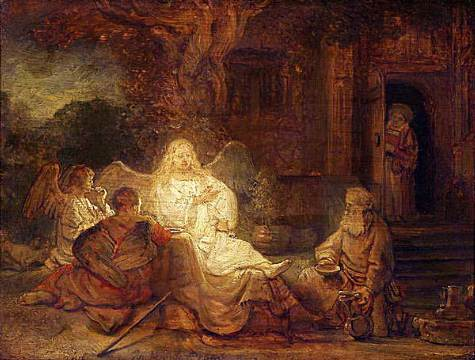
Abraham with three angels, Rembrandt

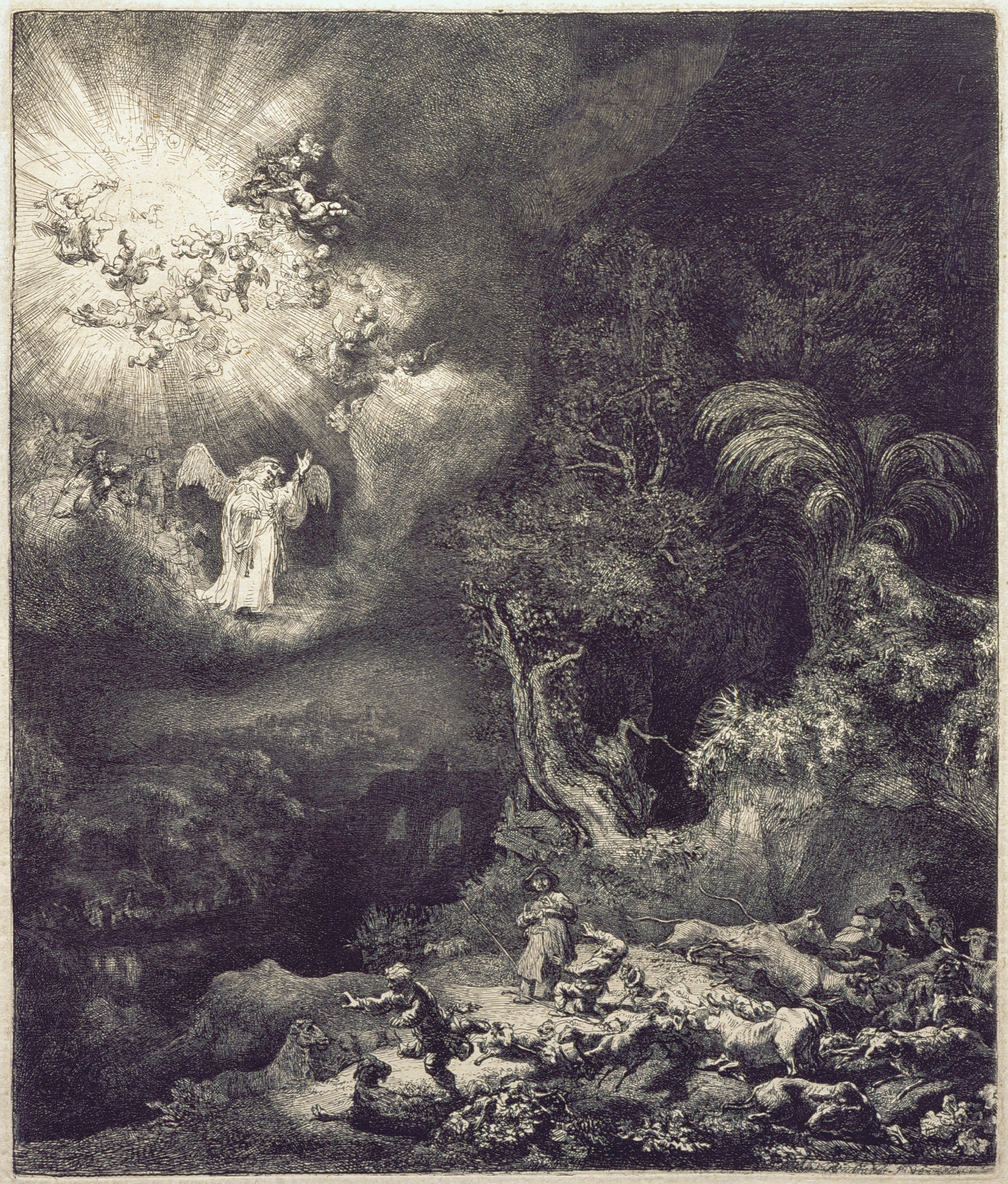
The Angel Appearing to the Shepherds, Rembrandt

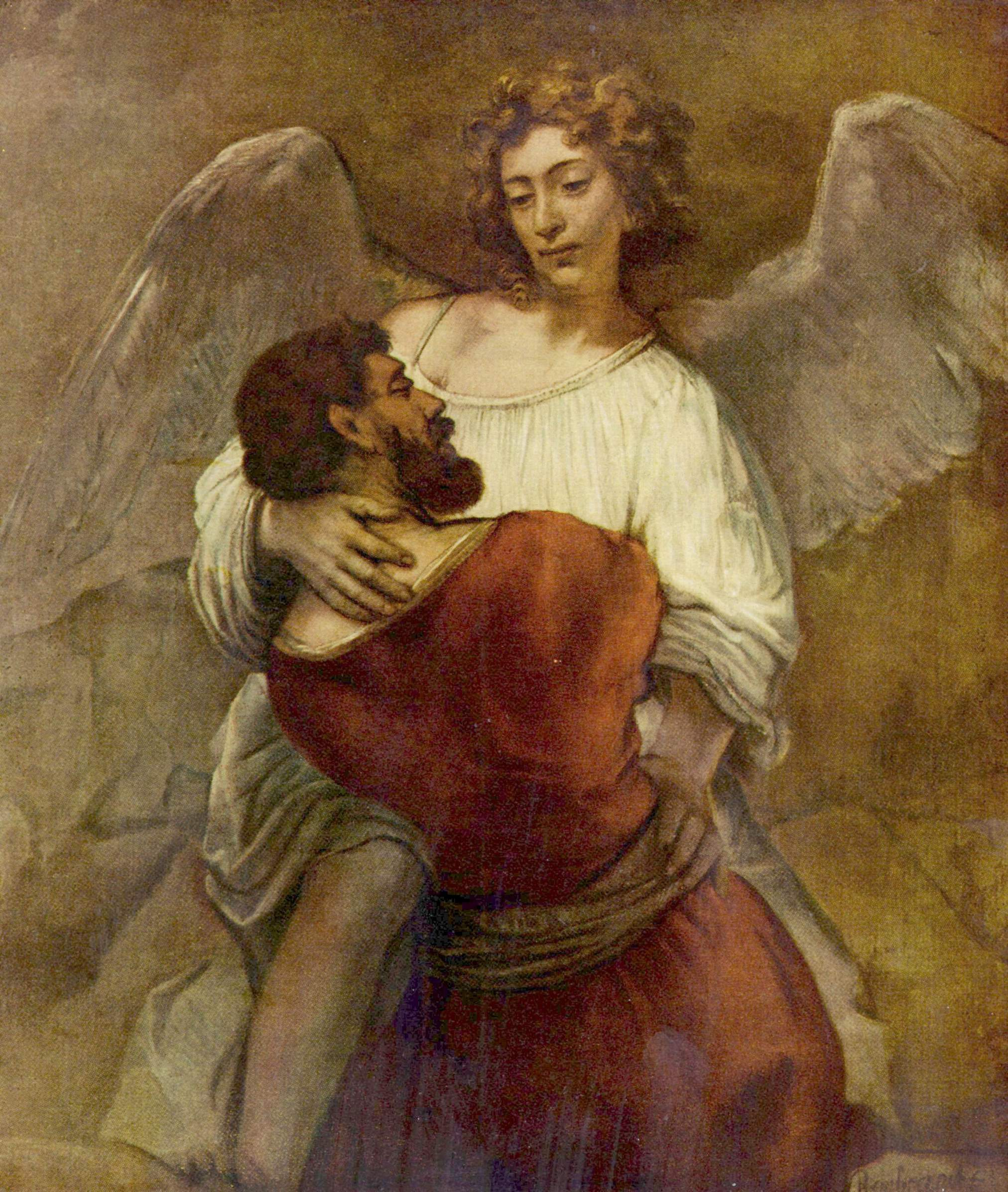
Jacob with an angel, Rembrandt 1659

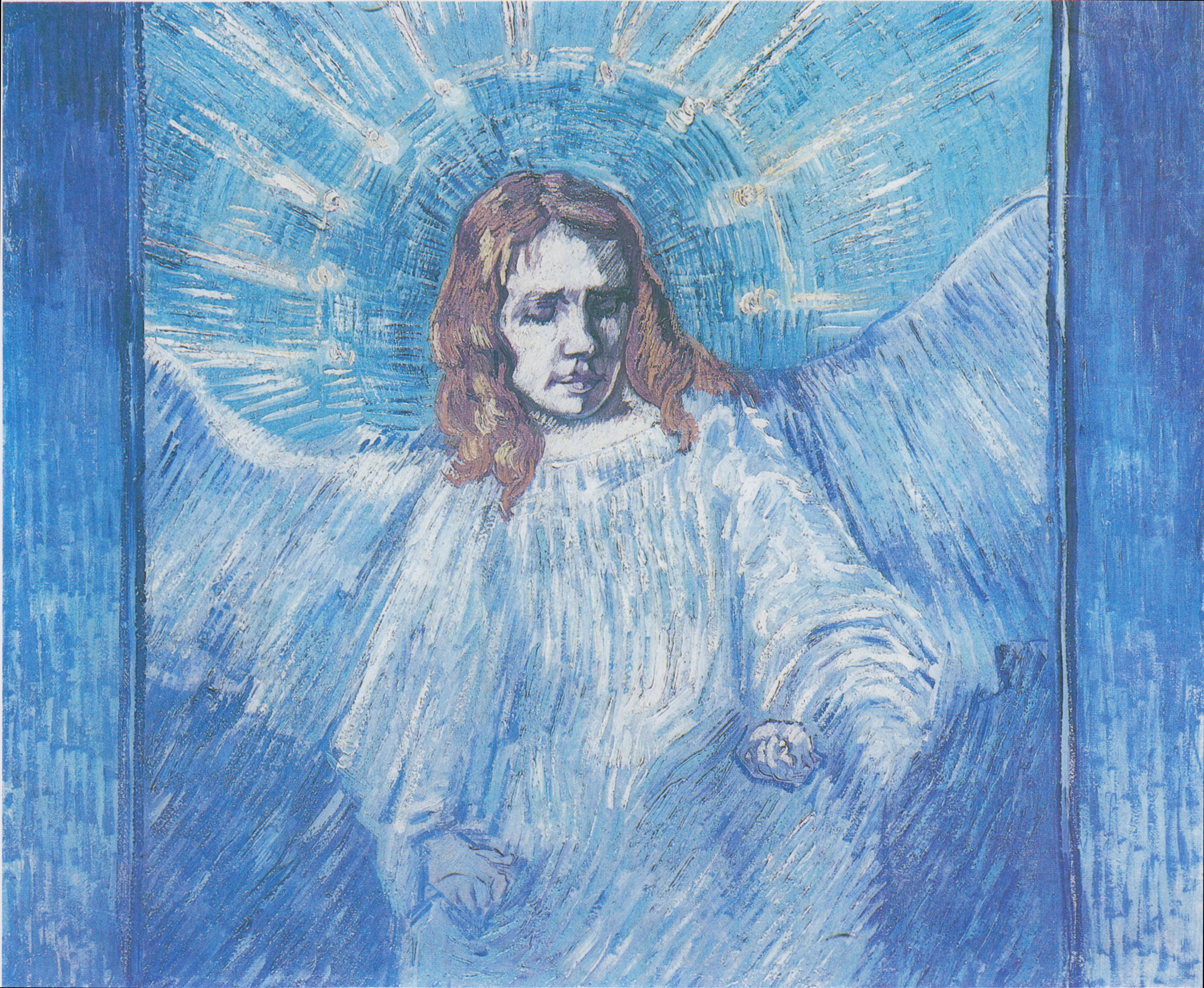
Half Figure of an Angel (after Rembrandt) 1889 (F624)

In Van Gogh's version of The Raising of Lazarus (after Rembrandt), Christ is depicted symbolically through the sun to evoke the healing powers of faith. Christ is further referenced in two ways by the setting and circumstance. First, miraculously, he brought Lazarus back to life again. It also foretold Christ's own death and resurrection. The painting includes the dead Lazarus and his two sisters. White, yellow and violet were used for Lazarus and the cave. One of the women is in a vibrant green dress and orange hair. The other wears a striped green and pink gown and has black hair. Behind them is the countryside of blue and a bright yellow sun.

In The Raising of Lazarus (after Rembrandt), van Gogh drastically trimmed the composition of Rembrandt's etching and eliminated the figure of Christ, thus focusing on Lazarus and his sisters. It is speculated that in their countenances may be detected the likenesses of the artist and his friends Augustine Rouline and Marie Ginoux. Van Gogh had just recovered from a lengthy episode of illness, and he may have identified with the miracle of the biblical resurrection, whose "personalities are the characters of my dreams."

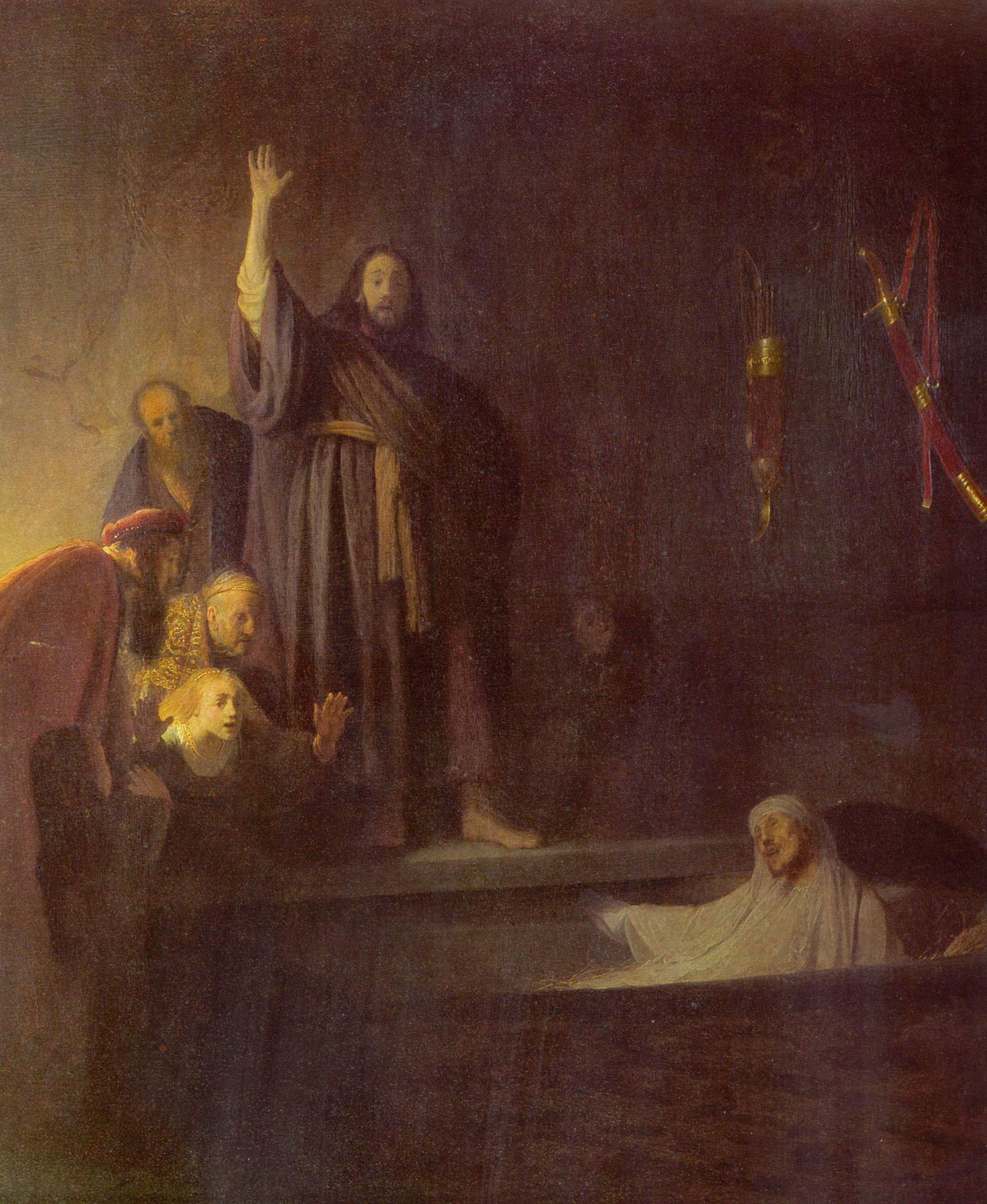
Resurrection of Lazarus, by Rembrandt

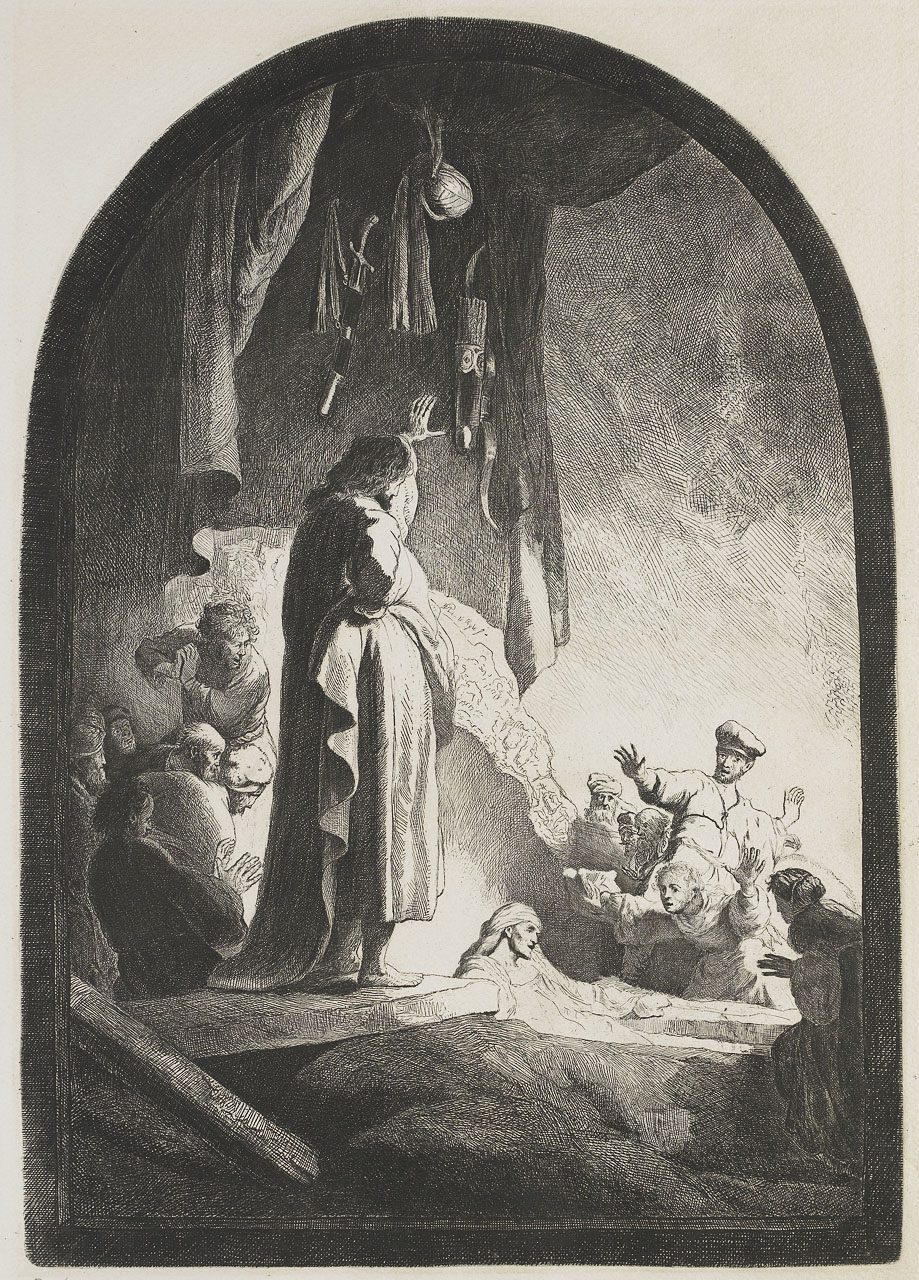
The Raising of Lazarus, by Rembrandt

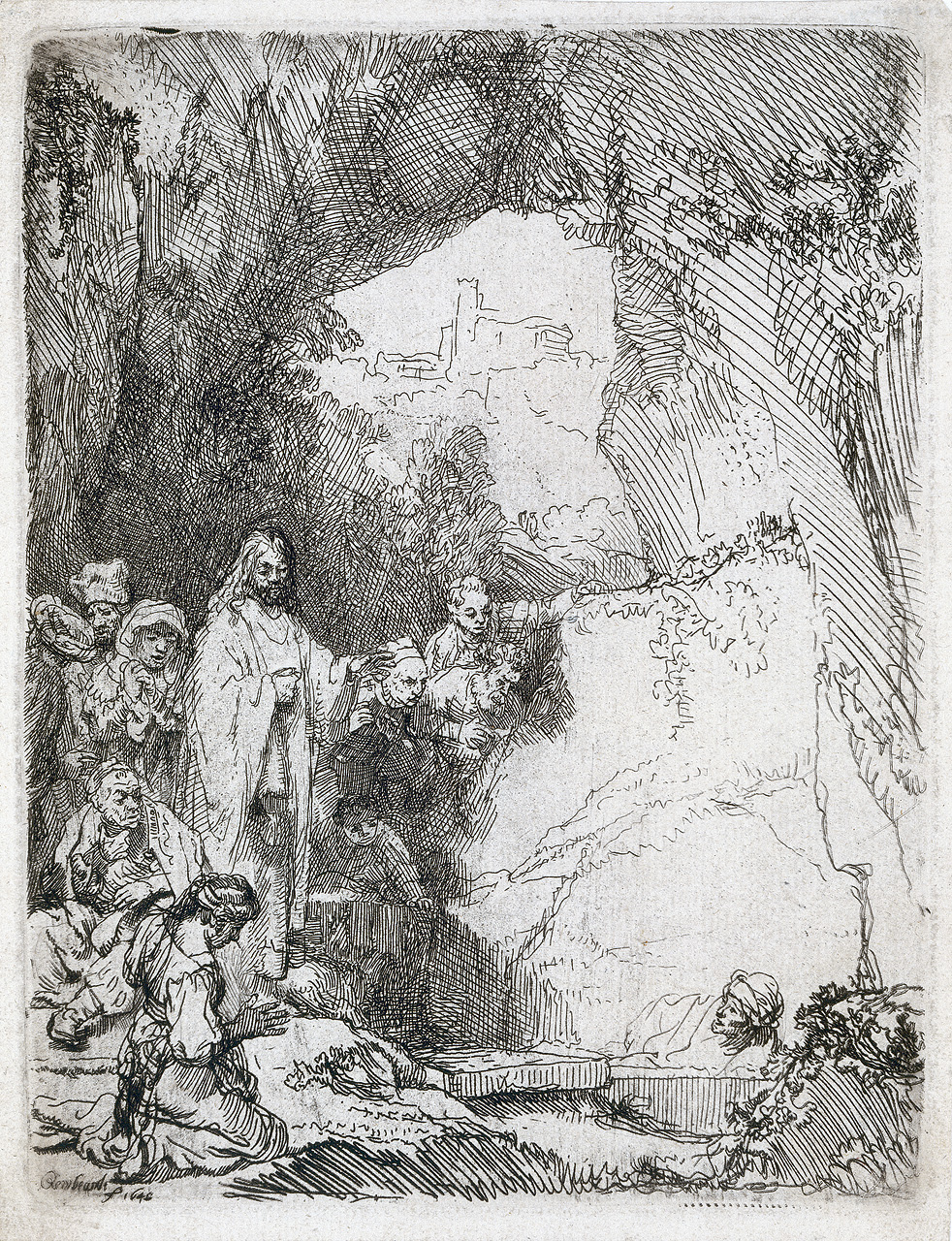
The Raising of Lazarus, by Rembrandt

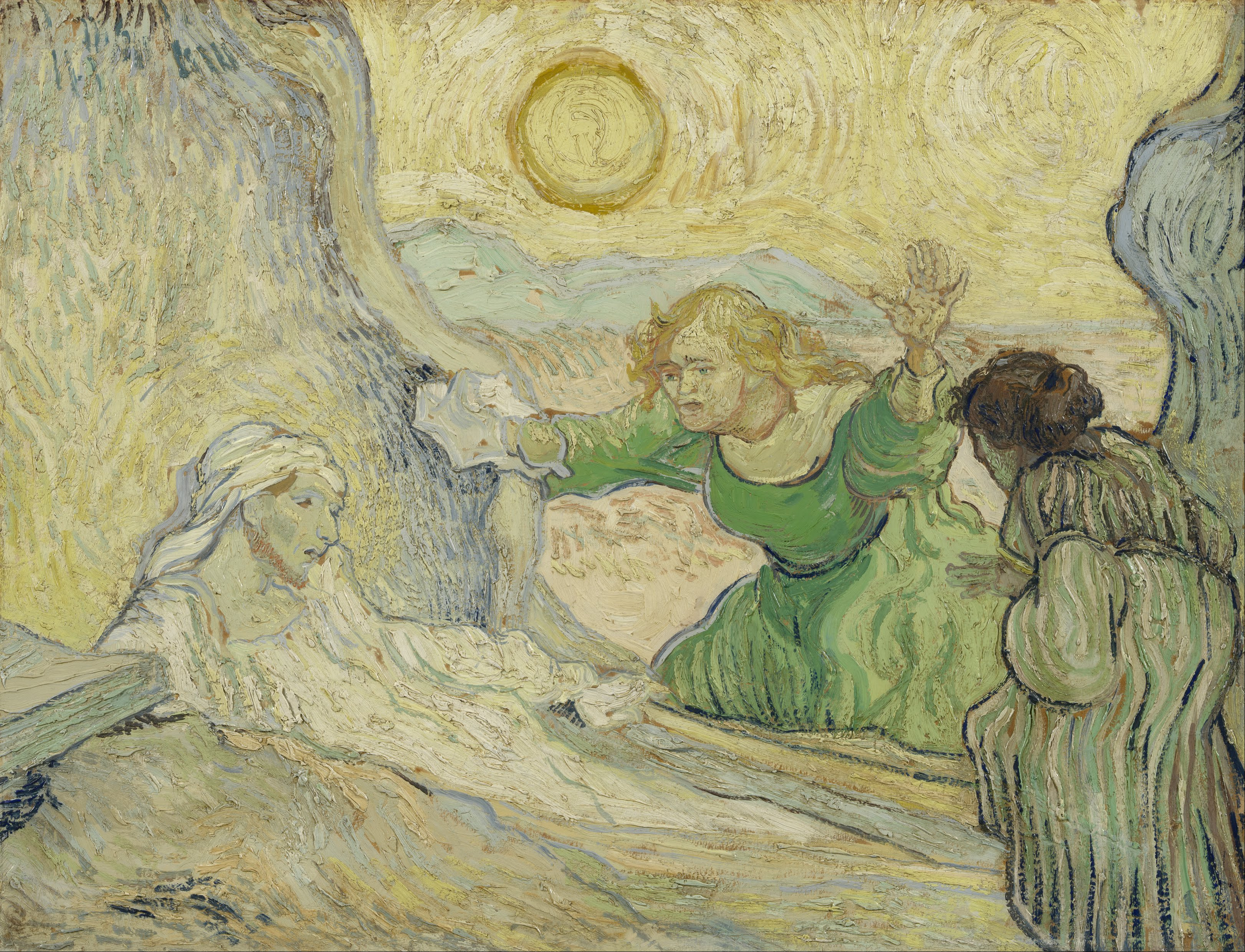
The Raising of Lazarus (after Rembrandt) by Vincent van Gogh 1890 Van Gogh Museum, Amsterdam, Netherlands (F677)

== See also ==
- List of works by Vincent van Gogh

== Bibliography ==
- Hulsker, Jan The Complete Van Gogh. Oxford: Phaidon, 1980. ISBN 0-7148-2028-8
