= Samuel Patrick Ofei Kumi =

Ghanaian diplomat (d. 2018)

Ambassador of Ghana to Germany
- In office February 1973 – 24 May 1974
- Succeeded by: Andrew Kow Afful

Samuel Patrick Ofei Kumi (died 2018) was a Ghanaian diplomat.

== Career ==
In February 1973, he was granted as the Ambassador Extraordinary and Plenipotentiary of the Republic of Ghana to the Germany. On 11 July 1973, Kumi was received by the Deputy Chairman of the State Council, Friedrich Ebert Jr., and accredited as ambassador. The farewell conversation with the Chairman of the State Council Willi Stoph took place on 24 May 1974, Andrew Kow Afful was his successor as Ghanaian ambassador. Subsequently, Kumi was accredited as ambassador to Hungary, based in Budapest.
