= The Cows (painting) =

1890 painting by Vincent van Gogh

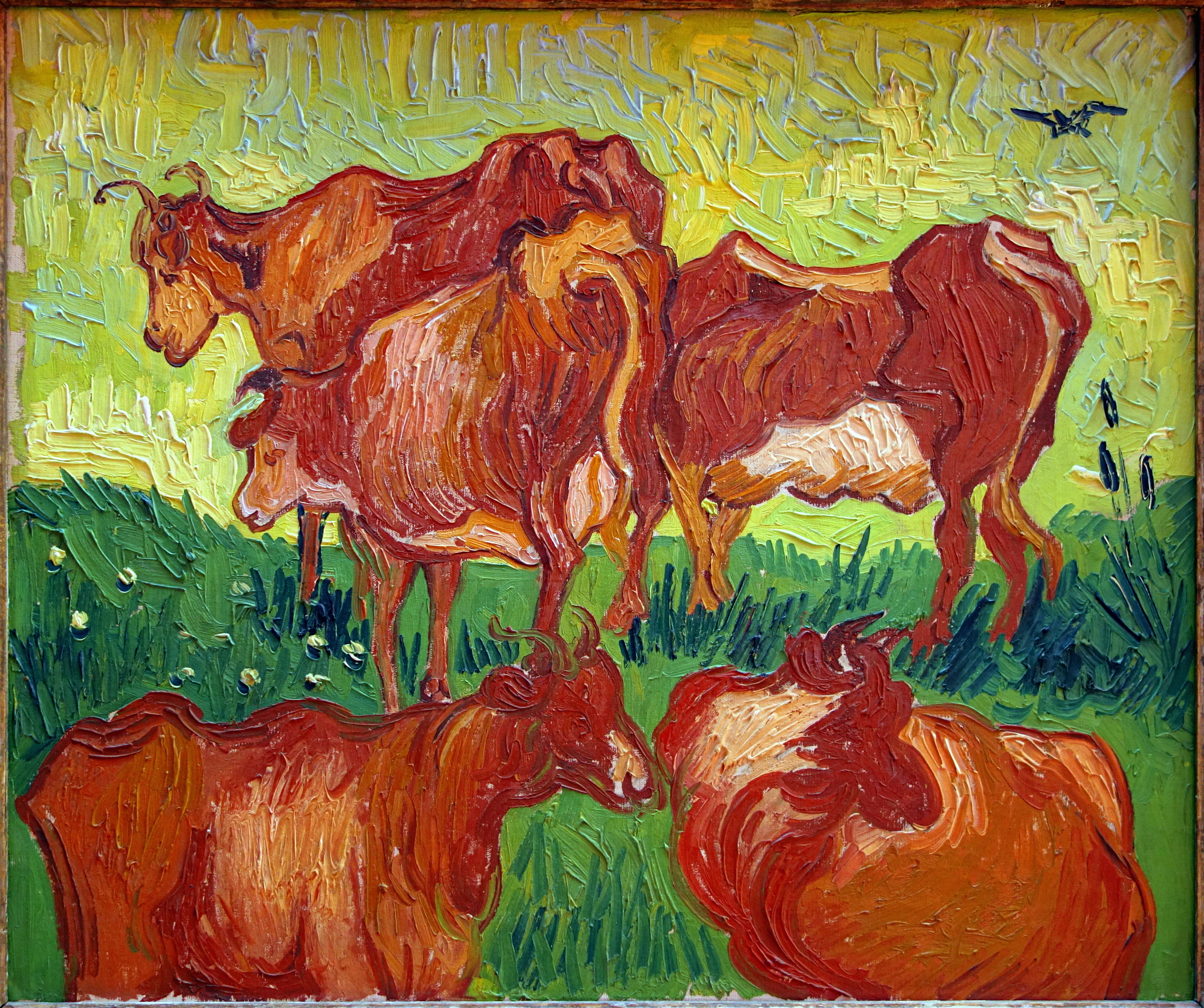
- Artist: Vincent van Gogh
- Year: 1890
- Catalogue: F822; JH2095
- Medium: Oil on canvas
- Dimensions: 55 cm × 65 cm (22 in × 26 in)
- Location: Palais des Beaux-Arts de Lille; Lille

The Cows is a painting by Vincent van Gogh, produced in July 1890 during his stay in Doctor Gachet's home in Auvers-sur-Oise. It is based on an 1873 Paul van Ryssel etching Gachet owned of Jacob Jordaens's Study of Five Cows, exhibited in the Palais des Beaux-Arts de Lille.

The work is one of a series of copies of previous artist's works that Van Gogh painted towards the end of his life. Van Gogh's painting is also now held at the Palais des Beaux-Arts de Lille.

== History ==
The painting was made by van Gogh during his stay in Auvers-sur-Oise, with Doctor Gachet. It is a copy, like van Gogh made many, of a study by Jacob Jordaens exhibited at the Palais des Beaux-Arts in Lille. The painting was not copied directly, but from an etching by Doctor Gachet from 1873, signed with his artist name, Paul van Ryssel.

The painting appears in the inventory of the Gachet collection made in 1903 by the German critic Julius Meier-Graefe, which he then referred to as Les Bœufs. In 1950, the son of Doctor Gachet decided to donate it to the museum of Lille, his father's birthplace, along with the engraving that inspired it. But the donation is debated within the committee responsible for ratifying donations. It opposes the curators of the Louvre to the inspection of provincial museums which considers that the work does not sufficiently reflect the genius of van Gogh to be hosted by a provincial museum and proposes to deposit it in the reserves of the Louvre. However, Paul Gachet insisted that the painting be exhibited in Lille. In 1951, it was assigned to the Louvre Museum and deposited at the Lille Museum of Fine Arts. In 1954, when the painting was exhibited at the Musée de l'Orangerie, it sparked a violent controversy over its authenticity led by a passionate van Gogh lover, Louis Anfray, and widely reported by the press. As with other works in the Gachet collection, it continued in the following years and has not yet died out, carried in particular by Benoît Landais. However, the laboratory examinations that were carried out did not reveal any clues that would make it possible to consider a fake. According to Anne Distel, it is more likely to be accepted for a minor work by van Gogh, perhaps a study for a painting he had in mind, produced in the exceptional circumstances of the end of his life in Auvers.

== See also ==
- List of works by Vincent van Gogh
- Copies by Vincent van Gogh
