= Cow (Mario) =

Mario Kart species

- Mario race
- Depiction of the playable Cow from Mario Kart World
- First appearance: Mario Kart 64 (1996)
- Based on: Cattle
- Other name: Moo Moo

Cows (Japanese: ウシ, Hepburn: Ushi), also referred to as Moo Moos (Japanese: モーモー, Hepburn: Mō Mō), are a species in the Mario Kart series, a sub-series of the Mario franchise. They resemble real-world cows, and typically walk on all four legs.

The Cows originally appeared in the 1996 game Mario Kart 64 as a non-playable character on the track Moo Moo Farm, and later on the track Moo Moo Meadows in the 2008 game Mario Kart Wii. Outside of the Mario Kart series, they also appear in the Mario Party series and Mario & Sonic at the London 2012 Olympic Games. A Cow is a playable character in the 2025 game Mario Kart World, with its inclusion inspiring the addition of other previous Mario series non-playable characters as racers.

The Cows have been received positively by video game journalists and fans since their inception, with a significant popularity spike following their appearance in Mario Kart World. The Cows' playable appearance in that game inspired a large amount of fan works featuring the character, but also resulted in pushback by animal rights group PETA, as well as by critics regarding the Cows' ability to eat presumed beef products in the game.

== Appearances ==
Cows first appeared in the 1996 video game Mario Kart 64 as non-playable characters in the background outside the perimeter of the track Moo Moo Farm. They later appeared on the track Moo Moo Meadows in the 2008 video game Mario Kart Wii, where they could walk onto the track and become obstacles to players. Both tracks were later remade in Mario Kart DS and Mario Kart 8 respectively. In Mario Kart Tour, a Mii costume themed after the Cows can be found, as well as a kart; the costume later returned in Mario Kart 8 Deluxe. Cows can also be seen on advertisements on other tracks, such as Toad's Turnpike. In the 2025 video game Mario Kart World, Moo Moo Meadows reappears as a track with the Cows repising their roles as obstacles, but a Cow was also chosen to be a playable character. The game also features multiple missions with non-playable Cows, including a mission involving driving while dodging Cows or where the Cows are being abducted. Unlike many characters in the game who receive unlockable alternate costumes through consuming the game's Dash Food item, the Cow has none. Outside of the Mario Kart series, Cows can be seen in the Mario Party series, Mario Pinball Land, Mario & Sonic at the London 2012 Olympic Games, and Yoshi's Crafted World. They are also included in a Mario-themed collection of skins in the game Minecraft, replacing its cows.

The Cow is planned to appear in the "Bowser's Rumbling Race" set in the upcoming Lego Super Mario Minifigure range which is scheduled to release in January 2027.

== Concept and creation ==
A sketch was passed around during early stages of Mario Kart World's development that led to the concept of non-playable character drivers, including the Cow.

The playable Cow is a female character which resembles a real cow, featuring black spots, a bell around its neck, hooves, horns, pink udders, and a nose ring. Variations of the Cow can appear on Moo Moo Meadows featuring an array of different patterns. Within the Mario universe, the Cow is depicted as a mascot for a milk brand, which can be seen advertised on trucks and sponsorship signs. Its home track, Moo Moo Meadows, was heavily remade in Mario Kart World in the Cow's image, displaying advertisements of her riding a motorcycle across the track as well as on an enlarged photo inside the track's barn. A large statue depicting the bike-riding Cow also appears at the starting line.

While working on a ranch area in Mario Kart World, a designer sketched an image of the Cow driving a truck. The sketch came up while the team was considering who could be added to the game, leading to its inclusion. The character designer created a prototype, which they felt it did not feel out of place as a racer and was considered cute. This prompted them to consider adding other obstacle characters as playable characters, which they dubbed "non-playable character drivers" (NPC drivers). The team aspired to ensure that NPC drivers like the Cow were voiced in such a way that did not make them feel inferior to characters like Mario, causing the voice cast to go through trial and error to accomplish this. The Cow was called a pivotal Mario Kart character by Mario Kart World art director Masaaki Ishikawa due to it influencing this direction.

== Critical reception ==
Since its appearance in the Mario Kart series, the Cows have been described by critics as one of the best cows to appear in video games; writing for Nintendo Life, Kate Gray commented on their designs throughout different Mario Kart instalments, praising their round and unintelligent appearance in 64 and 8, describing how its stupidity and blank expression made them look "much too dumb to live". Gray further described the Wii design as "an incredible update on a timeless cow classic", though felt that their role as a road hazard was more spiteful. Famitsu writer Abu Yamazaki wrote positively about how the cow's appearance was energetic and cute, exclaiming that they "can't get enough of [its] exquisite expression". One of the Cow's victory animations, in which the Cow stretches and presents its nipples on the udders, was reported to have caused discussion and surprise on social media due to how well detailed and rendered the nipples were, with some joking this was why World had a high price. Automaton Japan saw the high detail as a reflection on how far depictions of animals have come, framing the attention to detail on the nipples as "almost a reward".

Commenting on the Cow's inclusion in World, Alexandra Wells from Screen Rant praised the Cow's inclusion as Nintendo's way of "keeping its games the perfect amount of weird"; Wells further compared the inclusion to how characters such as Tingle and Piranha Plant became fan-favourites following their inclusion in The Legend of Zelda: Majora's Mask and Super Smash Bros. Ultimate respectively, speculating that this was due to fans wanting to choose someone other than the classic characters in the roster. IGN France similarly compared her inclusion in World to Piranha Plant's in Ultimate, though they declared the Cow's to be crazier as it represented the developers "exploring the Mario universe to the maximum". Steve Watts from GameSpot respected the unconventional inclusion and praised the way it "enabled a smorgasbord of other, equally unconventional racers". Writing for Endless Mode, Moises Taveras described the ability to play as the Cow as a saving grace within the conflicts of the world, writing that whilst getting to be the Cow "isn't changing the world, it does remind me that joy and good, two things that feel scarce these days, can still be found."

Following the announcement of Mario Kart World and the introduction of the Cow as a playable character, it quickly grew in popularity on social media such as X, Instagram and TikTok; some of the more popular posts depict gameplay of the Cow over songs such as "Mooo!" by Doja Cat, which had reached 1.9 million views on Instagram Reels. The New York Times writer Rylee Kirk noted that one of the reasons the Cow became so popular was because of its status elevation from background element to playable driver. When interviewing a fan for reasons for her popularity, they responded how the Cow exemplified Nintendo's approach to making games about "keeping joy in the game," describing the Cow being playable as a victory. Comicbook.com's Marc Deschamps reported that Mario Kart fans treated the Cow as a sort of mascot for the game. The Cow's home track, Moo Moo Meadows, had previously become the subject of a trend on Twitter in early 2024, with users editing the track's thumbnail with the Cow into alternate versions of itself; such as giving the Cow in the thumbnail a mask referencing Mad Max.

Its appearance in World prompted many fans to create fan art of the character, including from Japanese clay artist Nendozaika SNAIL and Chiikawa writer and illustrator Nagano, who both used their art of the Cow to express their struggle with finding a Nintendo Switch 2. World's development team was worried about whether players would be okay with the Cow being a playable character, and expressed happiness that it proved so popular. Shortly after World's release, journalists reported that online lobbies were dominated or even completely filled by players choosing to play as the Cow, with many fans declaring themselves as "Cow Mains" and some joking on social media that she had monopolized the game. They speculated part of the reason for the overwhelming amount of Cow players was due to players having immediate access to her without needing to do anything to unlock her. Carlos Zotomayor from Automaton West added that part her goofy design also attributed to her increased usage, connecting it to how the character Spike also saw a rise in usage a few weeks after launch.

Some criticism was laid against the character in relation to World's "Dash Food" item. Publications such as Comicbook.com and Siliconera criticising the absence of any costumes for NPC drivers such as the Cow to unlock when the player finds Dash Food, with both suggesting costumes such as a biker outfit or straw farmer hat as ideas for future DLC. Other critics voiced concern at the notion that the Cow could eat hamburgers or steak from the "Dash Food" item. Both GamesRadar+ and VG247 believed the Cow to be a cannibal, with Kelsey Raynor from VG247 disturbed by the idea that the Cows on Moo Moo Meadows were being processed into food. Alternatively, Shacknews's Asif Khan aired caution by suggesting that the burgers were instead plant-based. When asked by IGN during an interview whether the burgers were beef or veggie, producer Kosuke Yabuki responded by teasing "Sorry, that's top secret, I can't say."

In August 2025, animal rights organization PETA wrote a letter to Nintendo's president Shuntaro Furukawa urging the Cow to be redesigned to remove her nose ring. The letter associates the ring with abusive handling of bulls and cattle, and ends with the determination "Every animal is someone. So leave the rings to Sonic and let Cow breathe free!" Commentators on social media opposed the letter, with some mocking the letter whilst others argued that due to the character being fictional, she could have gotten the ring through non-violent means. In response to the online backlash, the organization's X account made a post stating "video games can shape how people see animals, so showing them respect matters both online and in real life".

In a September 2025 trailer for the game Sonic Racing: CrossWorlds, Sega referenced the Cow by depicting a live-action cow next to a run-down RV and a tortoise, using the scene to mock Mario Kart World and imply it was slow compared to CrossWorlds.
