= Sacred cow =

Sacred cow(s) may refer to:

- Sacred cow (idiom), something considered (perhaps unreasonably) immune to question or criticism

== Religion and mythology ==
- Cattle in religion and mythology, object of reverence, including:
  - Sacred bull, including ancient religions
  - Bull of Heaven in Sumerian mythology
  - Auðumbla and Gavaevodata, the primeval cows of Norse and Zoroastrian mythology
  - Tauroctony, the ritual bull-slaying of Mithraism
  - Red heifer, a sacred sacrifice in Judaism
  - Apis (deity), the Egyptian sacred bull

== Arts and entertainment ==
- Sacred Cow (album), by Geggy Tah, 1996
- Sacred Cows, an album by the Swirling Eddies, 1996
- "Sacred Cow" (Bob's Burgers), a 2011 TV episode
- Sacred Cow Productions, an American film company
- Sacred Cow Films, a beneficiary of South Australian Film Corporation's 2009 FilmLab initiative
- Sacred Cows: A Lighthearted Look at Belief and Tradition Around the World, a 2015 book by Seth Andrews

== Other uses ==
- Air Force One, first dubbed Sacred Cow, the official U.S. presidential aircraft

== See also ==
- Holy cow (disambiguation)
- The Sacred Chao, a fundamental element of Discordianism
- Sacred Chao, a side project of members of the band Living Death
