= Andrew Kow Afful =

Ghanaian diplomat

Ambassador of Ghana to Germany
- In office June 13, 1974 – November 10, 1978
- Preceded by: Samuel Patrick Ofei Kumi

Andrew Kow Afful is a former Ghanaian diplomat.

== Career ==
In 1966, Afful served as the first secretary of Ghana's permanent mission to the United Nations and a delegate to the 19th World Health Assembly. On June 13, 1974, Afful was received by Willi Stoph and accredited as Ambassador Extraordinary and Plenipotentiary of the Republic of Ghana. The farewell conversation with Friedrich Ebert Jr. took place on November 10, 1978. In the summer of 1980, Afful represented the Ghanaian government at the first United Nations seminar on the question of Palestine.
