= Harry Loud Bridwell =

Decorative artist and poster designer (1861-1930)

- Born: August 13, 1861; Cincinnati,Ohio, U.S.
- Died: September 12, 1930 (aged 69); Cincinnati, Ohio, U.S.
- Occupations: Artist; lithographer; illustrator
- Employer: Strobridge Lithograph Company (1896–1906)
- Known for: Advertising calendars; theatrical and decorative posters; magazine covers, maritime images; Cincinnati Grand Opera House decorations
- Spouse: Margaret Mullane Bridwell
- Children: Harry M. Bridwell; Dorothy Bridwell; Charles O. Bridwell
- Parents: James Wilson Bridwell (father); Harriot Victoria Loud (mother)

Harry Loud Bridwell (August 13, 1861 – September 12, 1930) was a prominent Cincinnati artist and illustrator. He was employed by the Strobridge Lithograph Company from 1896 to 1906 and was the artist behind many of the company’s famous advertising calendars.

== Career ==
Bridwell was apprenticed to a printer in his youth and took up the study of art on the side. He distinguished himself in decorative designs, period decorations, and hand lettering. He worked under Strobridge manager Matt Morgan, a noted cartoonist, and received praise for his “Bridwell Style” from Joseph Pennell, an American draftsman, etcher, lithographer, and illustrator for books and magazines. He originated the fine twenty-four-sheet posters used by theatrical stars, who visited him at his home to discuss posters for their upcoming plays. Bridwell’s skill in poster design led early American actors such as Joseph Jefferson, Maude Adams, Viola Allen, William Crane, Edward Sothern, and Julia Marlowe to seek him out. For many years, most of the poster work of Charles Frohman and Klaw and Erlanger was done under his direction.

As an advertiser, he worked with Royal Baking Powder, Aeolian and Ivory Soap. He created many magazine covers for Century and Harper’s book plates and foot-pieces, and designed many playing cards.

== Artistic contributions ==
Bridwell was also famous for his maritime images and for doing the decorations of the Cincinnati Grand Opera House. In his forties, he was stricken with a paralysis that paralyzed his entire right side and took away his speech. After a year, when his speech started to recover, he attempted to draw a leaf with his left hand and then drew it 6,000 times until he was satisfied with the outcome. He eventually returned to work, again designing posters and magazine covers. “Within a few years critics proclaimed his work was as good as ever,” read his obituary. Examples of his works can be found at the Cincinnati Art Museum and the Duke University Archives and Manuscripts collection.

== Early years and background ==
The Bridwells were a prominent family accredited with founding the town of Harriman, Tennessee, that is located about two hours east of Nashville. In Harriman, the Bridwells operated a major restaurant and started the town newspaper.

Harry L. Bridwell was the son of James Wilson Bridwell and Harriot Victoria Loud, a direct descendent of Mayflower passengers William and Mary Brewster. He married Margaret Mullane Bridwell and they had three children. Their children, Harry M. Bridwell and Dorothy Bridwell, both became decorative artists, with their own studio in Cincinnati, and Charles O. Bridwell was the manager of the creative department of the General Outdoor Advertising Company in New York.
