= Alfred Thompson (librettist) =

British musical theatre librettist

Alfred Thompson (pseudonym: Thompson E. Jones, 7 October 1831 – 31 August 1895) was a British musical theatre librettist, set designer, costume designer, theatre manager, journalist and artist, contributing to Punch and Vanity Fair (signed "Ἀτη").

== Biography ==
Thompson was born in London. He was educated at Rugby and Brighton. He matriculated at Trinity College, Cambridge, in 1850 and graduated B.A. in 1855. He served as a cavalry officer in the 6th Dragoons from 1855 until he sold his commission in 1857; he started as cornet and rose to captain. In 1854 he sold his first drawing to Diogenes and in 1856–1858 sold numerous drawings to Punch. He studied art in Munich with private lessons from Karl von Piloty and in Paris under Thomas Couture. In 1867 at the behest of Arthur à Beckett, Thompson joined the literary staff of The Tomahawk.

From February to December 1868, Thompson and Leopold David Lewis edited a monthly review The Mask, which failed. In the 1860s Thompson became successful as a librettist, set designer and costume designer for the British musical theatre in London. For the English stage he designed over five thousand costumes. During the 1870s in Manchester he was managing director of the Theatre Royal and the Prince's Theatre. In May 1883 as a journalist he represented the Daily News at the coronation of Tsar Alexader III. In the latter part of his career Thompson moved to Manhattan and became successful as a librettist for New York City musicals similar to those he had worked on in London and Manchester.

== Libretti ==
- The Lion's Mouth. London. 1867.
- Columbus, or The Original Pitch in a Merry Key. Gaiety Theatre, London. 1869.
- Aladdin II, or an Old Lamp in a New Light. London. 1870.
- Cinderella, the Younger. London. 1871.
- Belladonna, or The Little Beauty and the Great Beast. Prince's Theatre, Manchester. 1878.
- Pepita, or the Girl with the Glass Eyes. Union Square Theatre, NYC. 1886.
- The Arabian Nights, or Aladdin's Wonderful Lamp. NYC. 1887.
- The Crystal Slipper, or Prince Prettywitz and Little Cinderella. Star Theatre, NYC. 1888.

== Gallery from Vanity Fair ==
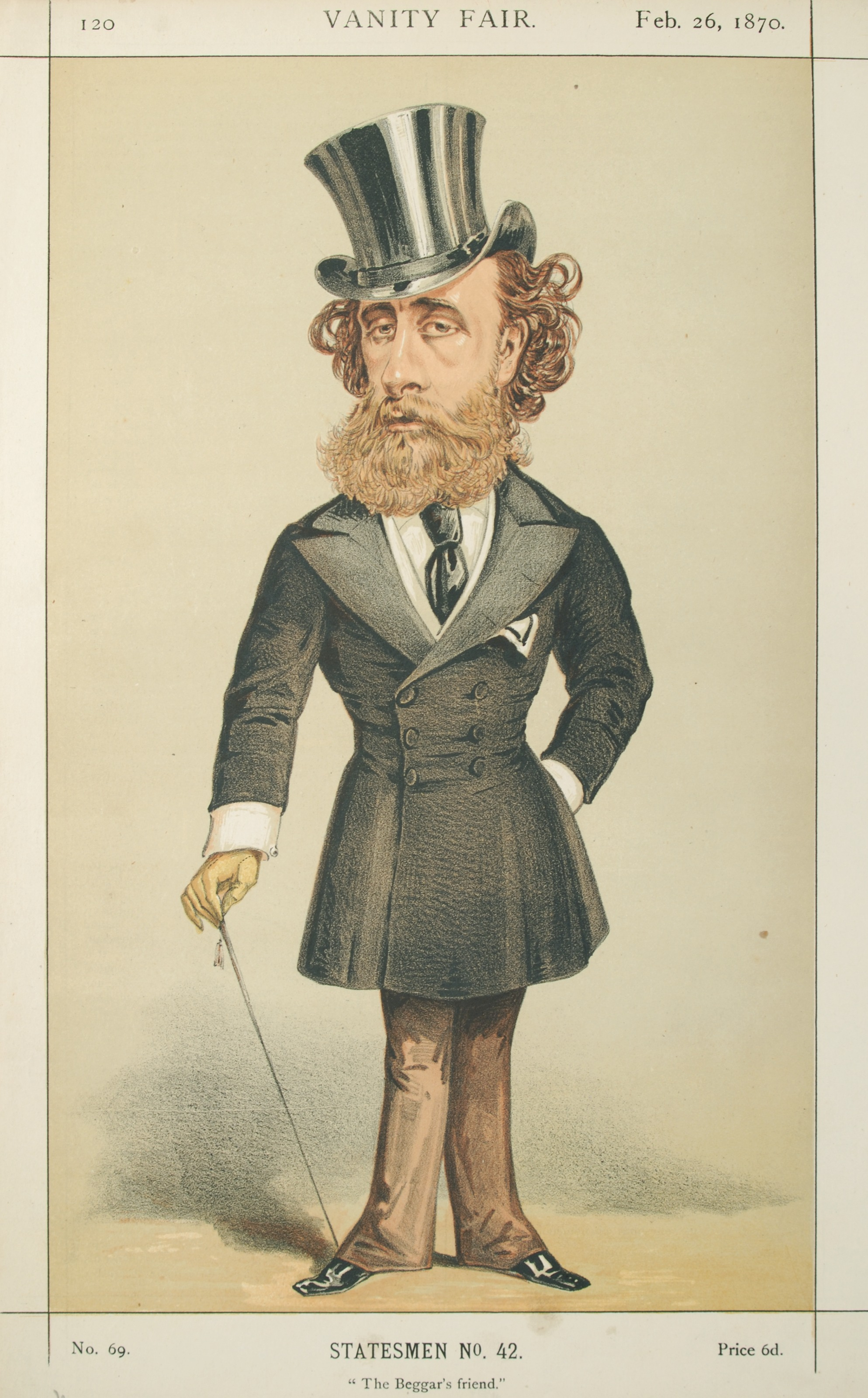
John Villiers Stuart Townshend by "Ἀτη" in the 26 February 1870 issue

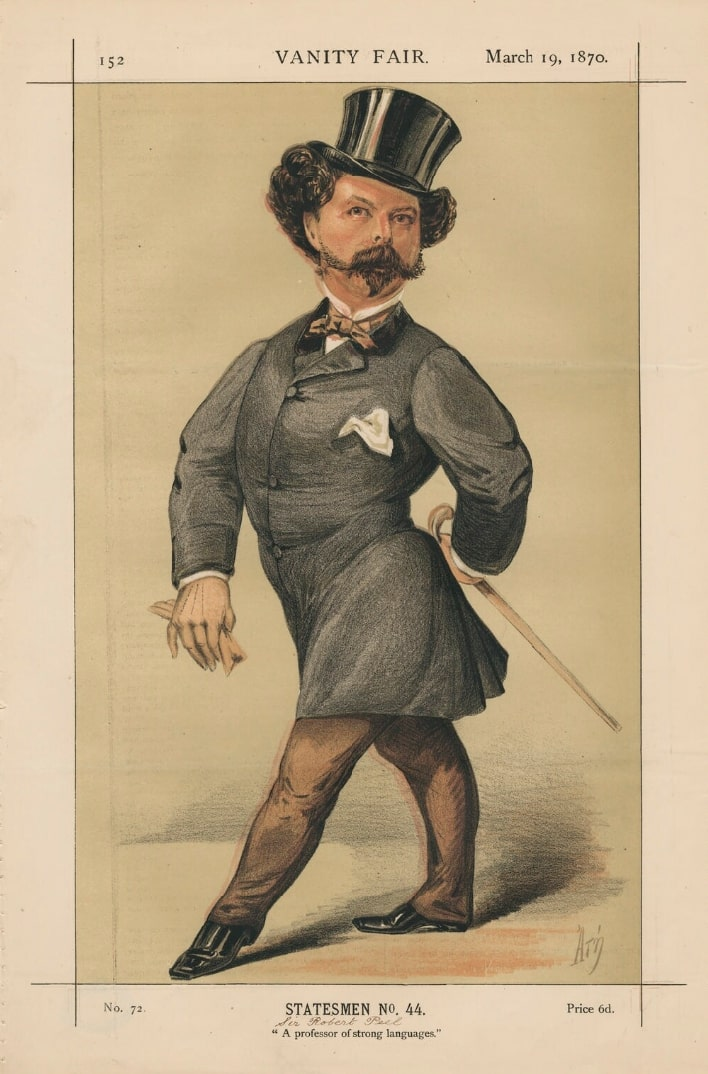
Sir Robert Peel by "Ἀτη" in the 19 March 1870 issue

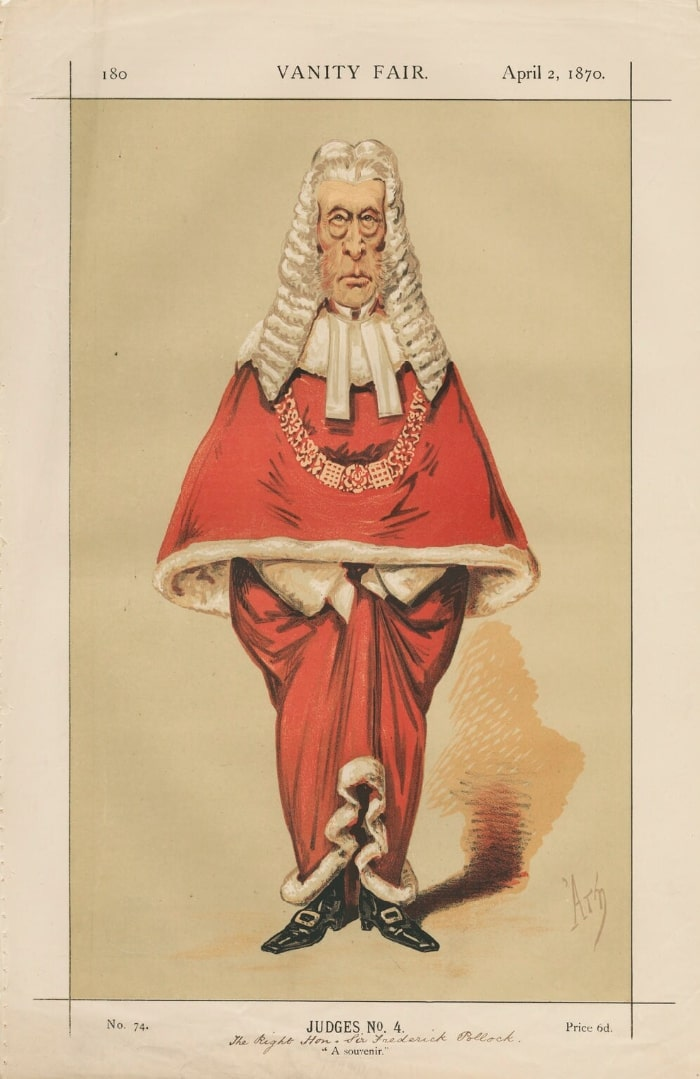
Sir Frederick Pollock by "Ἀτη" in the 2 April 1870 issue

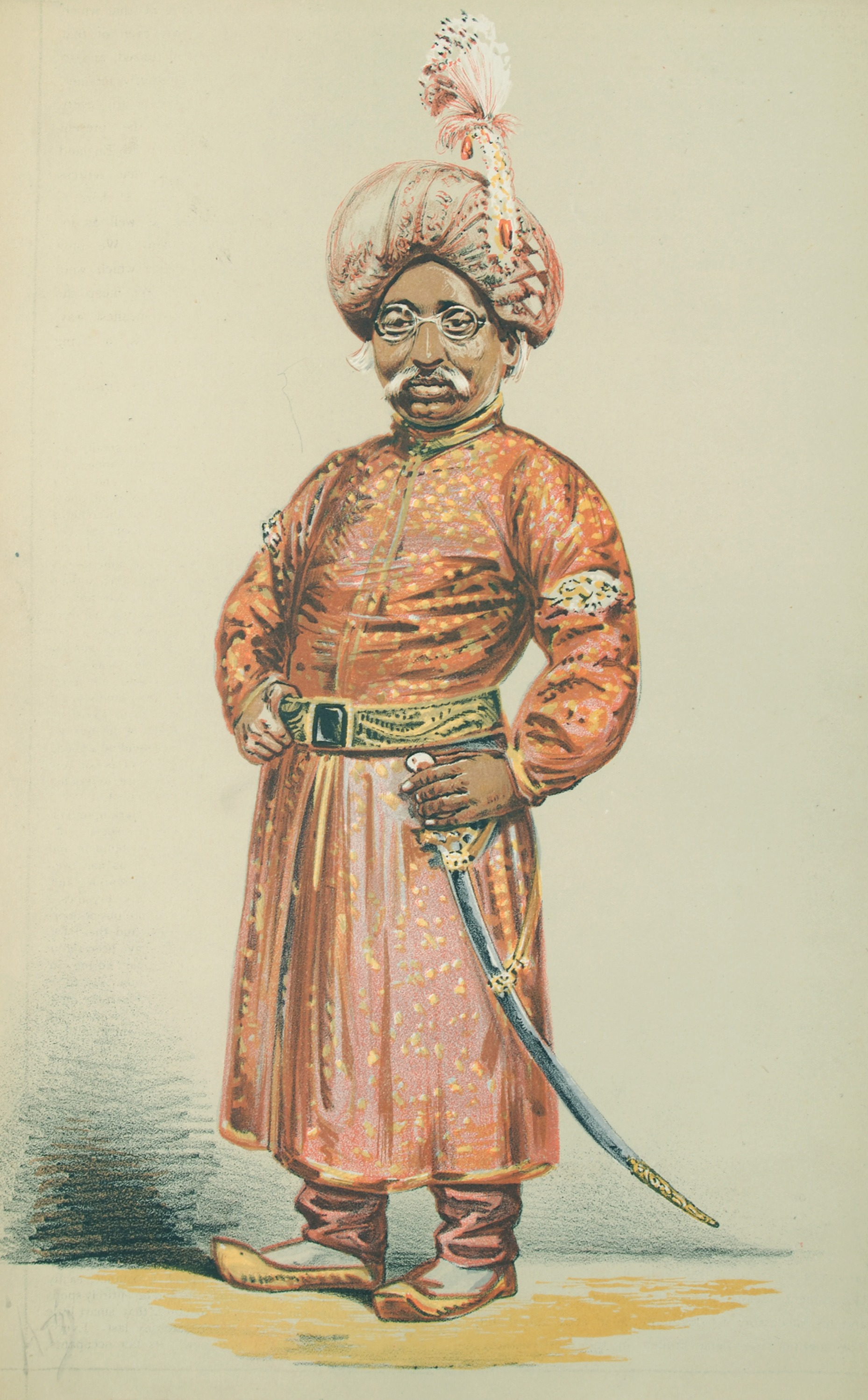
Mansur Ali Khan of Bengal by "Ἀτη" in the 16 April 1870 issue

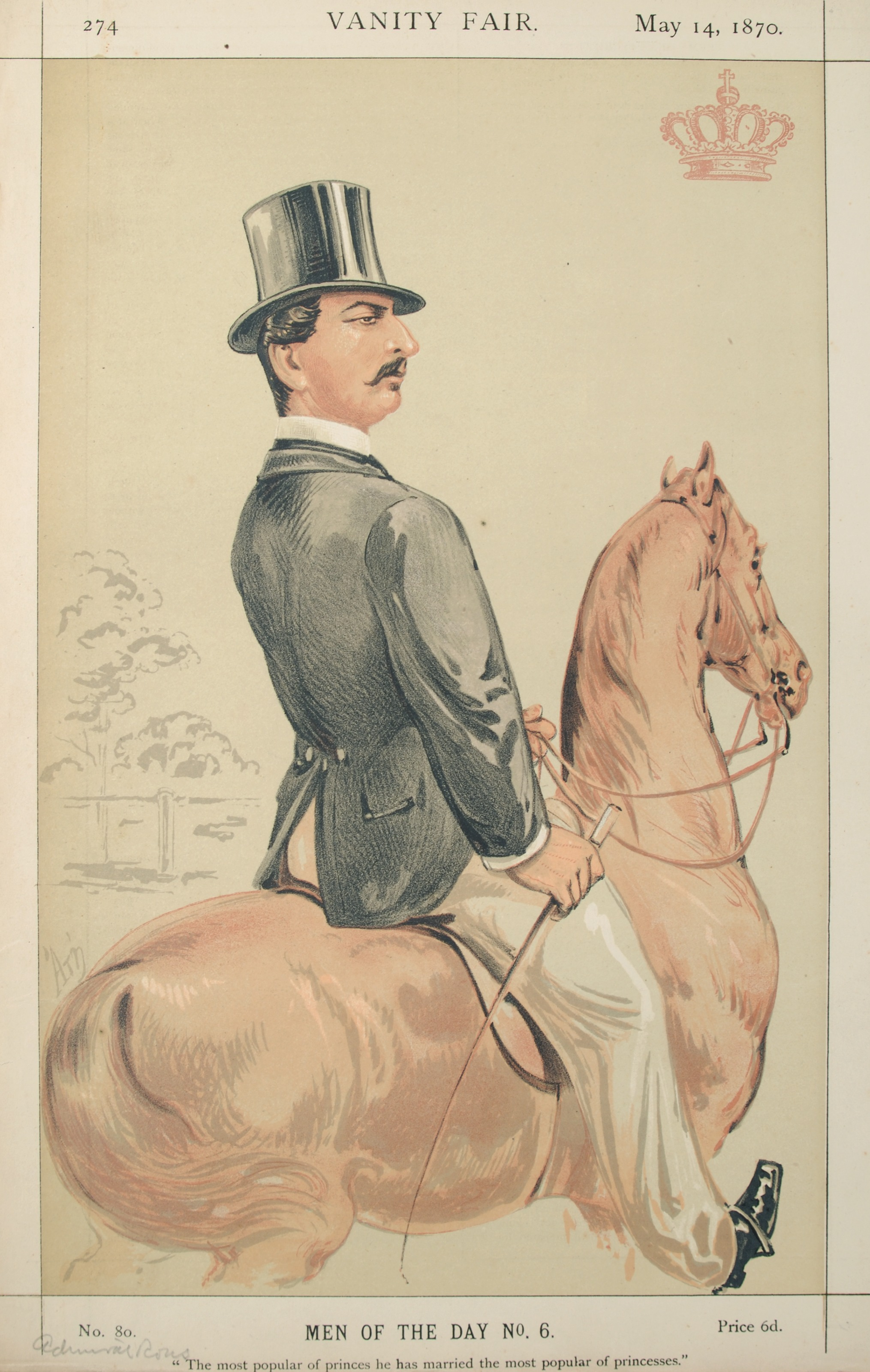
Francis, Duke of Teck by "Ἀτη" in the 14 May 1870 issue

== See also ==
- Pepita; or, the Girl with the Glass Eyes
- Vanity Fair caricatures
