= Tomahawk (magazine) =

The Tomahawk: A Saturday Journal of Satire was a weekly satirical magazine published between 1867 and 1870, price 2d. It was edited by Arthur à Beckett and the artist was Matt Morgan. Other contributors included Gilbert à Beckett, Frank Marshall, Alfred Thompson (who later founded The Mask), the composer Frederic Clay, and Thomas Gibson Bowles.
