= Pepita; or, the Girl with the Glass Eyes =

Comic opera by Alfred Thompson and Edward Solomon

Pepita; or, the Girl with the Glass Eyes, based on a story by E. T. A. Hoffmann, is a comic opera in three acts written by Alfred Thompson and composed by Edward Solomon. The opera was produced and directed by Thompson and Solomon and debuted at the Union Square Theatre, New York, then under the management of J. M. Hill, on March 16, 1886, and closed after a nine-week run on May 22.

== Principal roles and original cast ==
Pepita, Professor Pongo's Daughter as Lillian Russell
Don Pablo, the governor's son and heir as Chauncey Olcott/ G. Taglieri
Professor Pongo, Doctor of Sciences as Jacques Kruger
Donna Carmansuita, Directress of Seminary for Young Ladies as Alma Stuart Stanley
Don Giavolo, Governor of Scaliwaxico as Fred Clifton
Don Juan, Pablo's inevitable friend as George Wilkinson
Curaso, valet to Pablo as Frederick Solomon
Pasquela, a forward pupil as Lizzie Hughes
Maraquita, an advanced idem as Clara Jackson
Chiquita, a prominent ditto as Cora Striker
Juana, a maid in waiting as Julia Wilson
Ballet Coryphée as Miles. Pasta, S. Watson/ Forstner Atkins.

== Synopsis ==
Setting: The City Of Scaliwaxico.
Time—High Old. Period—Uncertain.
ACT I.—The Students' Frolic. Before Professor Pongo's House in Scaliwaxico.
ACT II.—The Professor's Prodigy. Interior of Pongo's Sanctum.
ACT III.—The Governor's Fete. Don Giavolo's Palace. In this scene will appear The Mechanical Waiters and The Humming Birds.

== Plot ==
Professor Pongo is obsessed with automata, as is Governor Giavolo. Pepita, the professor's daughter and Pablo, the governor's son, are in love. Her father disapproves and Pablo is forbidden to visit. To gain entry past her father, Pablo disguises himself as one of the cadavers Pongo plans to use to augment his mechanical devices. That night when Giavolo pays Pongo a visit, curious to view his mechanisms, neither knows that two of the automatons entertaining them have Pepita and Pablo concealed inside.
