= Alma Stanley =

British actress and vocalist (1854–1931)

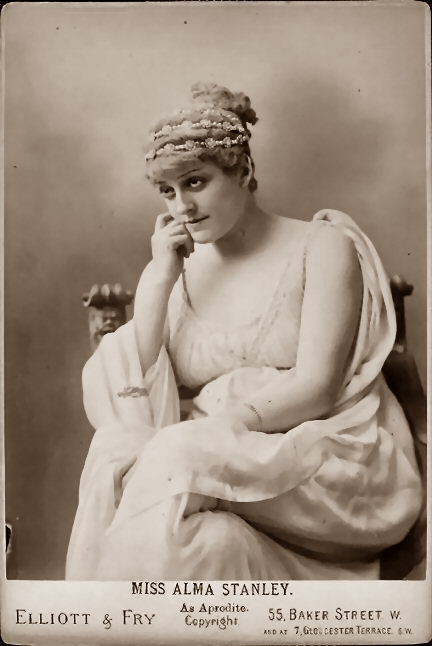
- New York Public Library Digital Gallery, c. 1880s
- Born: 26 October 1854; Saint Helier, Jersey
- Died: 8 March 1931 (aged 76); London, England
- Occupations: Actress, Vocalist and Dancer

Lenore Alma Stuart Stanley (26 October 1854 – 8 March 1931) was a British actress and vocalist once popular on both sides of the Atlantic Ocean. She was perhaps best remembered as Lady Teazle in Sheridan's The School for Scandal and Aphrodite in George Procter Hawtrey's Atlanta. In a career of more than thirty years she appeared in some sixty plays and made two North American tours. Her later years were spent in reduced circumstances, culminating with her death at a London prison hospital following an arrest for public intoxication.

== Early life ==
Lenora Alma Stuart Stanley was born in the parish of Saint Helier, in Jersey, Channel Islands. Her father, Stuart Stanley, reportedly was once a captain in the bodyguard of Maximilian I of Mexico. Stanley first trained as a dancer and made her stage debut at age 18 in Milan, Italy.

== Career ==
Stanley's British debut came at the Theatre Royal, Hull in 1873, in Victor Hugo's tragedy Lucrezia Borgia (Genevieve Ward). The following year she was chosen by John Hollingshead to join the cast at Cremorne Gardens, London, in productions of Black-Eyed Susan and English adaptations of Offenbach's La rose de Saint-Flour and La fille de Madame Angot. In 1876 Stanley became a cast member at the Gaiety Theatre, London when Nellie Farren, Kate Vaughan, Edward O'Connor Terry, and Edward Royce were at the pinnacles of their popularity. She joined Kate Santley at the Royalty Theatre, London playing Adonis in the Edward Rose and A. Harris 1879 extravaganza Venus. Stanley later participated in various theatrical tours of Britain.

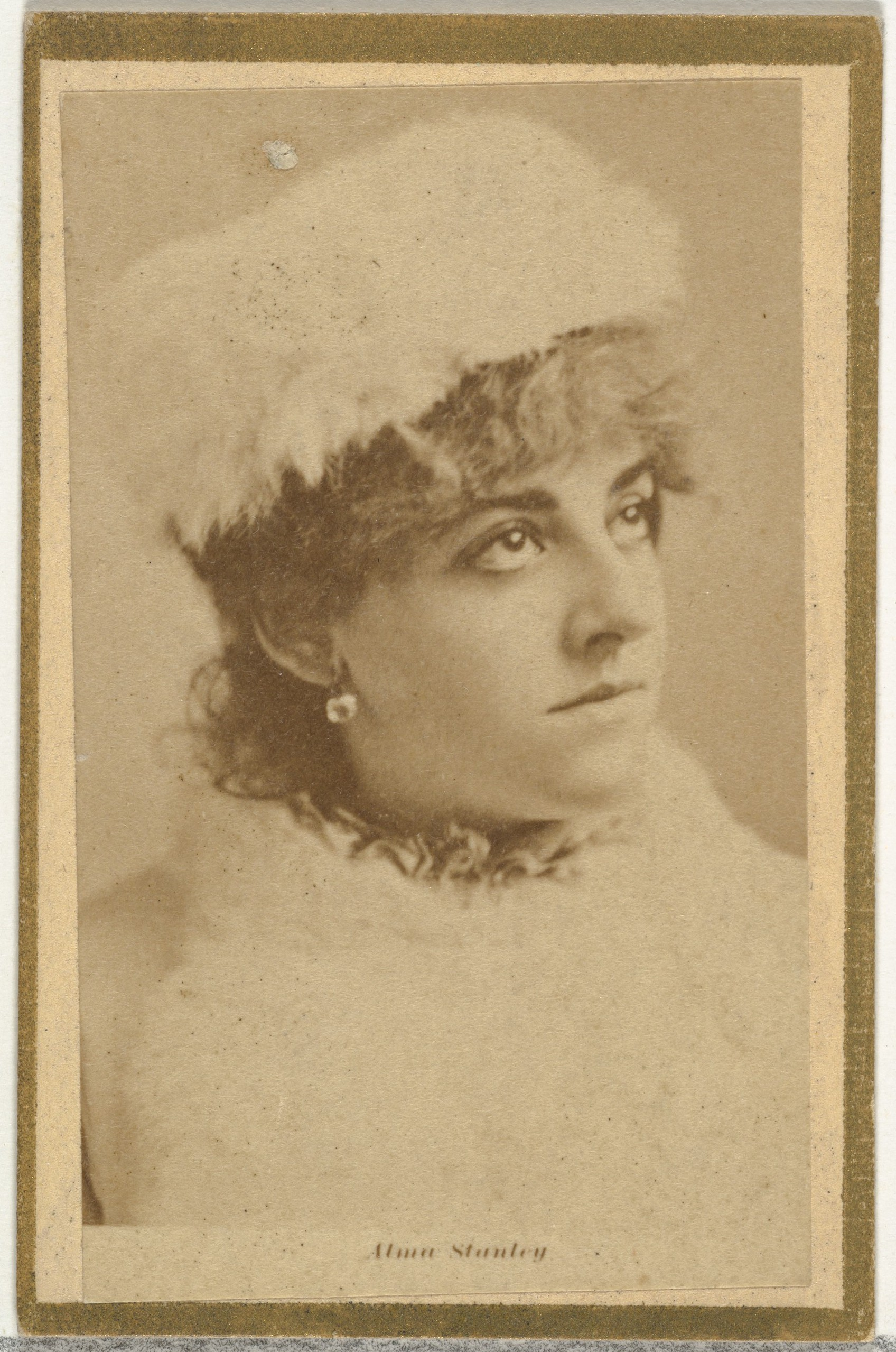
Stanley on an Allen & Ginter cigarette card

In 1880 Stanley signed with M. B. Leavitt's Grand English Operatic Burlesque Company and that April sailed from Liverpool for New York aboard the steamship Helvetia. Her first known appearance in America was in August 1881 at the Fifth Avenue Theatre as Laura Smiff in G. F. Rowe's Smiff. That September, Stanley joined Leavitt's company at Haverly's 14th Street Theatre, New York playing Pasquillo to Selina Dolaro's Carmen in Frank W. Green's Carmen; or, Soldiers and Seville-ians. At the same venue that October Leavitt's company performed for the first time in America an English adaptation of La fille du tambour-major, with Stanley in the role of Duchess Della Volta. It was about this time, when Leavitt ran into financial difficulties, that Stanley chose to resign rather than take a pay cut. Later that month she was a replacement as Lady Ella in the original American production of the Gilbert and Sullivan comic opera Patience.

Stanley's first big success in America came in February 1882 at Wallack's Theatre playing the cigar-toting boy, Willie Spratley, in the English extravaganza Youth. She next signed with Lytell's Canadian Tour for the summer season, and that fall toured in a less than successful adaption of Abraham Benrimo's novel, Vic. Stanley ended her American tour in the summer of 1883 and returned to England to appear at the Adelphi Theatre in a revival of Dion Boucicault's Streets of London.

For nearly twenty years afterward, Stanley would star or play significant roles in scores of productions in London or elsewhere. She was a leading lady to Augustus Harris for two seasons late in his career and toured with Mckee Rankin in America. A sampling of plays she performed in over her career include;

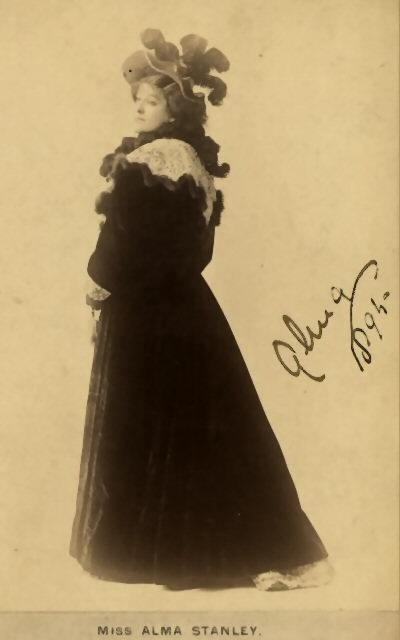
Alma Stanley, 1894

- Dragona, Folly Theatre, 14 April 1879;
- Cupid, Theatre Royalty, Southampton, 14 April 1882;
- The Beggar Student (English adaptation), Alhambra Theatre, London, 3 April 1884;
- Paintin' 'Er Red, (a.k.a. Paintin' the Town Red) North American Tour, fall, 1885;
- Pepita; or, the Girl with the Glass Eyes, Union Square Theatre, New York, 16 March 1886;
- The Bridal Trap (from the French Serment d'Amour), Bijou Opera House, New York, 31 May 1886;
- Cinderella, Theatre Royal, Birmingham, 27, December, 1886;
- Aesop's Fables, the Comedy Theatre, London, October 1889
- Domestic Economy, Comedy Theatre, 7 April 1890;
- Struggle for Life, Avenue Theatre, London, 25 September 1890;
- Carmen up to Data, Gaiety Theatre, London, 27 October 1890;
- The Sleepwalker, Royal Strand Theatre, London, 24 July 1893 (remembered for her rendition of Daddy Wouldn't Buy Me a Bow Wow);
- The Derby Winner, Drury Lane Theatre, London, 6 October 1894;
- The Cotton King, Adelphi Theatre, 10 March 1894
- Fanny, Royal Strand Theatre, London, 15 April 1895;
- Mrs. Ponderbury's Past, Avenue Theatre, London, November, 1895;
- A Man about Town, Avenue Theatre, London, January, 1897

== Marriage to Charles de Garmo Porter ==
Though Stanley was thought to have married several times, her only known husband is Charles de Garmo Porter, a one-time actor, manager and event promoter. They married in November 1884 at St. Raphael's Catholic Church, Surbiton, shortly before Stanley's second North American tour, and had separated by the time she returned to England late in 1886. Porter was known to the Pinkerton National Detective Agency as a hustler who operated under various aliases. Their files held allegations that Porter had once taken advantage of a well-to-do woman, procured prostitutes for American tourists in Paris, and had a history of involvement in questionable business schemes. Porter was considerably shorter than his statuesque wife, which at times led to derogatory comments in the press such as referring to him as his wife's poodle. A few years later, during divorce proceedings, it was alleged that Porter had, on more than one occasion during their marriage, brutally beat her. Stanley received her divorce in July 1890.

== Later life ==
Stanley retired in 1902 after playing Mrs. Veasey in The House Agent's Dilemma at Queen's Gate Hall, South Kensington, and largely disappeared from the public eye. In the late 1920s she moved into a five-room flat in Notting Hill Gate. During this time, she was living on a £20 per month (nearly $100) trust fund. She claimed to be in her late 50s although she was in her 70s and used the name Mrs. Porter. Stanley told visitors about the identification bracelet on her ankle near a leg wound she said was received at the Battle of Mons during the First World War.

== Death ==
Toward the end of February 1931, Stanley was found unconscious in London's Shepherd's Bush neighbourhood. She was charged with being drunk and incapable and held overnight at Holloway prison. She made bail the next morning and returned some ten days later to answer the charges. While waiting for her court appearance, Stanley collapsed and later died at the prison hospital. The cause of death was determined to be bronchitis compounded by alcoholism.
