= Fun (magazine) =

Defunct Victorian weekly magazine

Cover of first issue, 21 September 1861

Fun was a Victorian weekly humorous magazine, first published on 21 September 1861 in competition with Punch.

The magazine's first editors were H. J. Byron and Tom Hood. They had many well-known contributors, including Tom Robertson, Ambrose Bierce, G. R. Sims and Clement Scott but the most important contributor to its success in its first decade was W. S. Gilbert, whose Bab Ballads were almost all first published in Fun between 1861 and 1871, along with a wide range of his articles, drawings and other verses.

At a penny an issue Fun undercut its rival, Punch, and prospered into the 1870s, after which it suffered a gradual decline. It passed through various ownerships under different editors, and ceased publication in 1901, when it was absorbed into a rival comic magazine, Sketchy Bits.

== History ==
=== Early years ===
Fun was founded in 1861 by a London businessman, Charles Maclean, who believed there was scope for a rival to the established comic weekly magazine Punch. He established its premises at 80 Fleet Street, London, and installed the writer H. J. Byron as its titular editor, although in the early days the editing seems to have been a collective effort by Byron, Tom Hood and others. Fun became known as "the poor man's Punch": at a penny for its weekly issue of twelve pages, it sold at a third of the price of its older rival. According to the historian Charles Barrie, Fun "had a young upstart liveliness, which by then Punch had lost, and was well received, reaching a circulation of 20,000 by 1865". Each issue of Punch featured a drawing of Mr Punch and his dog, Toby: Fun parodied them with its own jester, Mr Fun, and his cat.

According to the introduction to the Gale Fun archive, the new magazine became Punch's most successful rival and surpassed the older publication in its commentary on literature, fine arts, and theatre. The Gale site adds:

Fun distinguished itself by appealing to the lower-middle class, as opposed to Punch's upper-class readership, and by carrying a genre that was slower to catch on in England than in France and Germany: the comic strip. Fun's politics were liberal, and the staff took a warm interest in things American, especially American humor.

"The Fun gang" included, clockwise from top left, H. J. Byron, Tom Hood, W. S. Gilbert, and F. C. Burnand

Fun was aimed at a well-educated readership interested in politics, literature and theatre. Like Punch, it published satiric verse and parodies, as well as political and literary criticism, sports and travel information. These were often illustrated or accompanied by topical cartoons, often of a political nature. The more conservative and establishment-minded Punch took a condescending view of its upstart competitor. William Makepeace Thackeray, a longstanding contributor to the older publication, dubbed the new magazine "Funch". Mark Lemon, the editor of Punch, nevertheless made frequent efforts to lure Fun's best contributors away. He succeeded with F. C. Burnand but failed with Fun's star contributor, W. S. Gilbert.

Encouraged by the success of Fun and looking to make more money, Byron founded and became editor of another humorous paper, Comic News, in July 1863. He was succeeded at Fun by Hood in May 1865, when Edward Wylam, a prosperous manufacturer of dog biscuits, bought the business.

=== Peak years: 1865–1874 ===
Hood assembled a vivacious and progressive team, who liked to think of themselves as bohemian, albeit in a generally respectable way. The historian Jane Stedman describes them:

The Bohemianism of the "Fun gang", as they called themselves, consisted [in] frequenting cheap unconventional clubs … in having ties with a stage not yet considered respectable, and in ebullitions of irreverence and independence both in private and in print. Most of them lacked money; one or two needed soap. Some drank too much, and some died too early. But many were young men from professional families, with university educations and legal training, who worked in government offices, [but] gravitated to journalism. Their bachelorhoods or marriages were generally respectable too. In short, their Bohemianism was essentially a sentimental, laughing, crusading camaraderie – or, at least, some of them, looking back, thought so.

Notable contributors included Tom Robertson, Ambrose Bierce, G. R. Sims and, most importantly for the magazine's fortunes, W. S. Gilbert, who was an unknown novice when Fun began, but who rapidly became its most valuable asset. His Bab Ballads were almost all published in Fun, along with other articles, verses, illustrations and drama criticism over a ten-year period.

Hood, the son of a famous poet, was exacting in his standards. Clement Scott recalled, "In the matter of verse Tom Hood was a purist. A Cockney rhyme was to him an abomination. A false rhythm sent him crazy. It was an education, indeed, to be brought up under such a strict master". As well as Gilbert, Hood's writers of verse included Mortimer Collins, Edmund Yates, Jeff Prowse and Harry Leigh. Cartoonists included Arthur Boyd Houghton, Matt Morgan and James Francis Sullivan (1852–1936).

The Fun gang frequented the Arundel Club, the Savage Club, and especially Evans's Café, where they had a table in competition with the Punch "Round table". Even though Fun was seen as liberal in comparison with the increasingly conservative Punch, it could cast satirical scorn or praise on either side of the political spectrum. For instance, Disraeli, whose unorthodox character and Jewish lineage made him a frequent target of attack, was praised in the magazine, particularly for his Reform Bill of 1867.

=== Later years ===
The ownership of Fun passed in 1870 to the engravers and publishers George and Edward Dalziel, who had previously engraved drawings for Punch. Two years later they transferred it to their nephew Gilbert Dalziel (1853–1930). After the death of Hood in 1874 the quality of the content began a slow decline. Gilbert's contributions ceased in the early 1870s, and although Fun still had talented writers including Clement Scott and Arthur Wing Pinero, the magazine lost a key asset without his unique combination of what Stedman calls "squibs, fillers, puns, verses, drawings, social and dramatic criticism, suggestions for double acrostics (a special Fun feature), absurd letters, and, of course, the Bab Ballads, which out-laughed anything Punch had to offer".

Hood was succeeded as editor by Henry Sampson until 1878, and then the editorship devolved to Charles Dalziel. In 1893 the Dalziel family withdrew from the journal, and Henry T. Johnson became editor. Fun was bought by the publisher George Newnes, who sold it to Charles Shurey, proprietor of a rival comic paper early in 1901. It ceased publication in the same year, when it was absorbed into Shurey's Sketchy Bits.

== Gallery ==
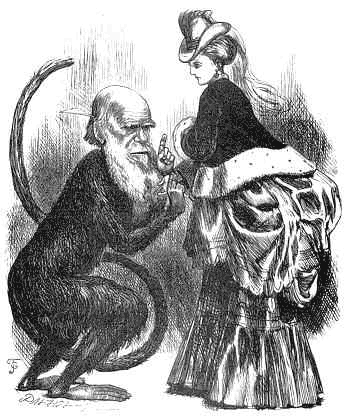
Caricature of Charles Darwin, 1872

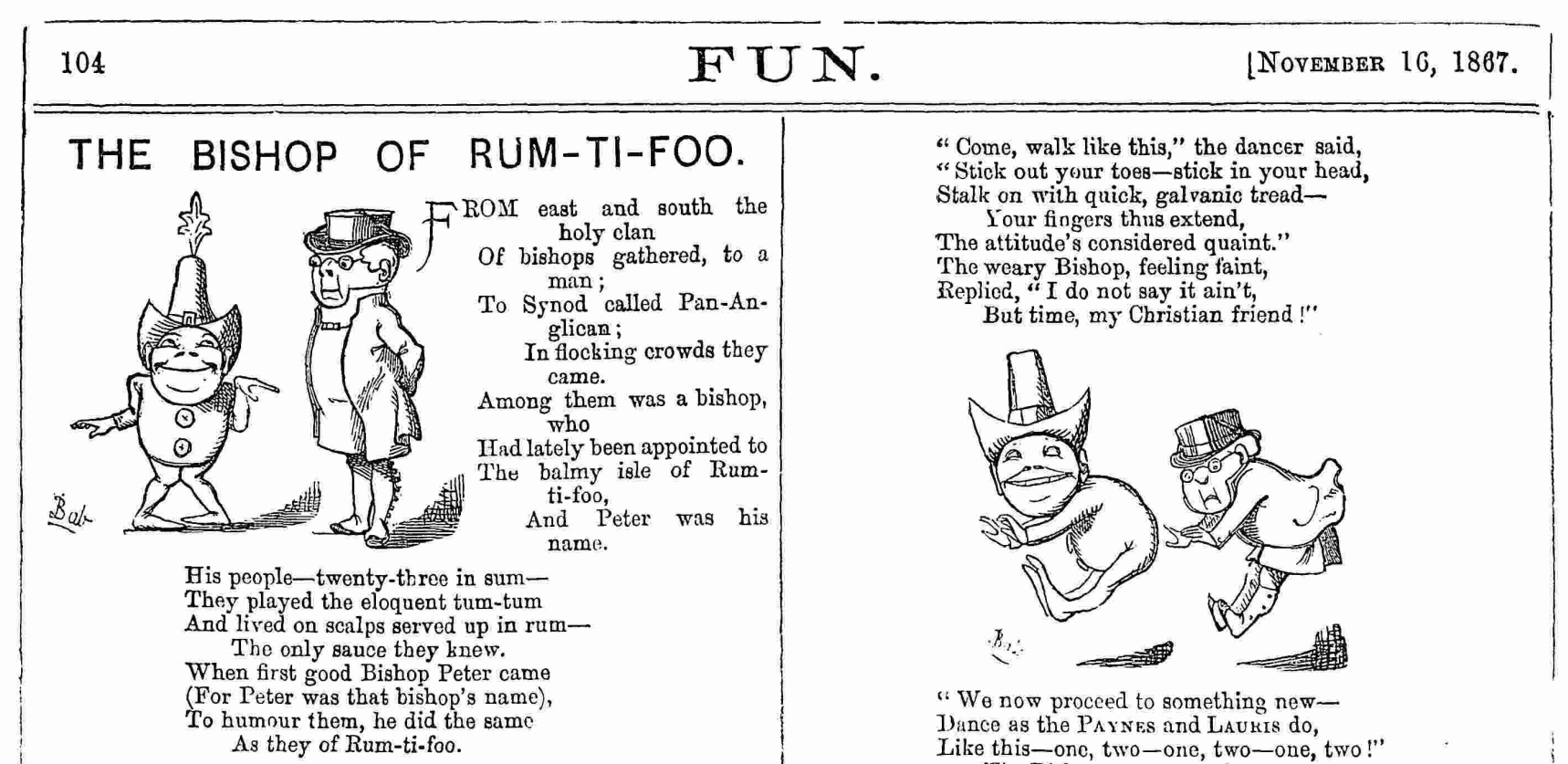
Debut of one of Gilbert's Bab Ballads, 1867

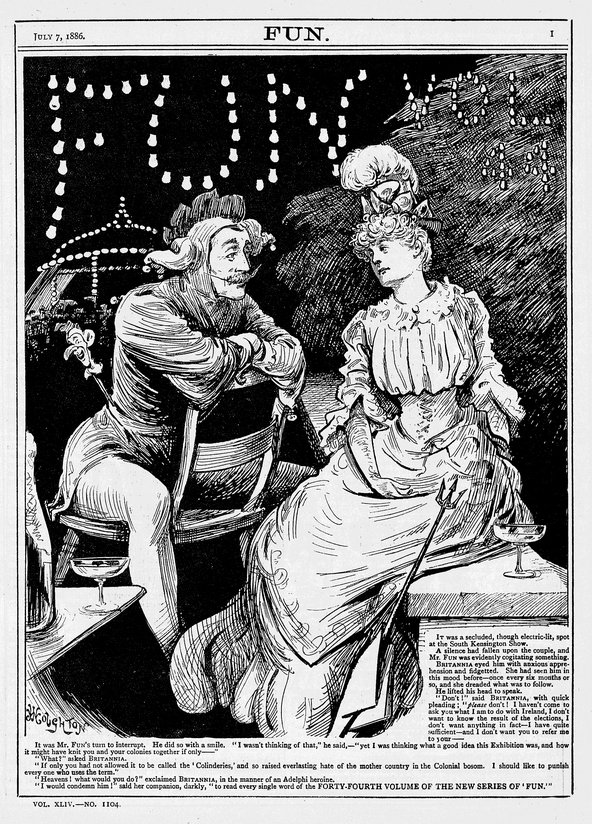
Later front page, 1886

== Sources ==
- Barrie, Charles (2014). The Lucky Queen: The Eight Assassination Attempts on Queen Victoria. Stroud: Amberley. ISBN 978-1-4456-4369-4.
- Spielmann, M. H. (31 August 1895). "The Rivals of Punch". Littell's Living Age. Boston: Littell and Co. OCLC 608617909.
- Stedman, Jane W. (1996). W. S. Gilbert: A Classic Victorian and His Theatre. Oxford: Oxford University Press. ISBN 978-0-19-816174-5.
