= Matt Morgan (cartoonist) =

English-American watercolorist (1837–1890)

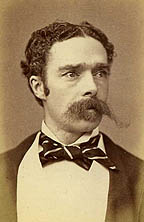
- Born: 27 April 1837; London, United Kingdom
- Died: 2 June 1890 (aged 53); New York City, United States

Matthew Somerville Morgan (27 April 1837 – 2 June 1890) was an English-American artist primarily known for his political cartoons in various publications. He also created theater posters for major American acts in both the United States and Great Britain.

== Biography ==
=== Early life ===
Morgan was born in London. His father was an actor and music teacher; his mother, Mary Somerville, an actress and singer. Matt studied scene painting and followed his profession at London's Princess's Theatre, but became artist and correspondent for the Illustrated London News. In 1859, Morgan worked in northern Italy covering the bloody Franco-Austrian War. He also studied in Paris, Italy, and Spain, and was one of the first artists to penetrate into the interior of Africa, which he did in 1858 by way of French Algeria. In 1859, he reported the Second Italian War of Independence for the News.

=== Career in the United Kingdom ===
He became joint editor and proprietor of the Tomahawk, a comic illustrated London paper, and its artist. By 21 September 1861, the London publication Fun began its run, with Morgan on board as an artist.

The most notable of his cartoons were attacks on the royal family, the first that were ever made. He was associated with F. C. Burnand, W. S. Gilbert, and others, in the establishment of the London humor magazine Fun; his first "big cut" came out on 28 December 1861. He continued to draw the main cartoon for Fun until October 1864. A volume of his cartoons in this paper has been published under the title American War Cartoons (London, 1874). He was principal scene painter to the Royal Italian Opera, Covent Garden.

=== United States ===
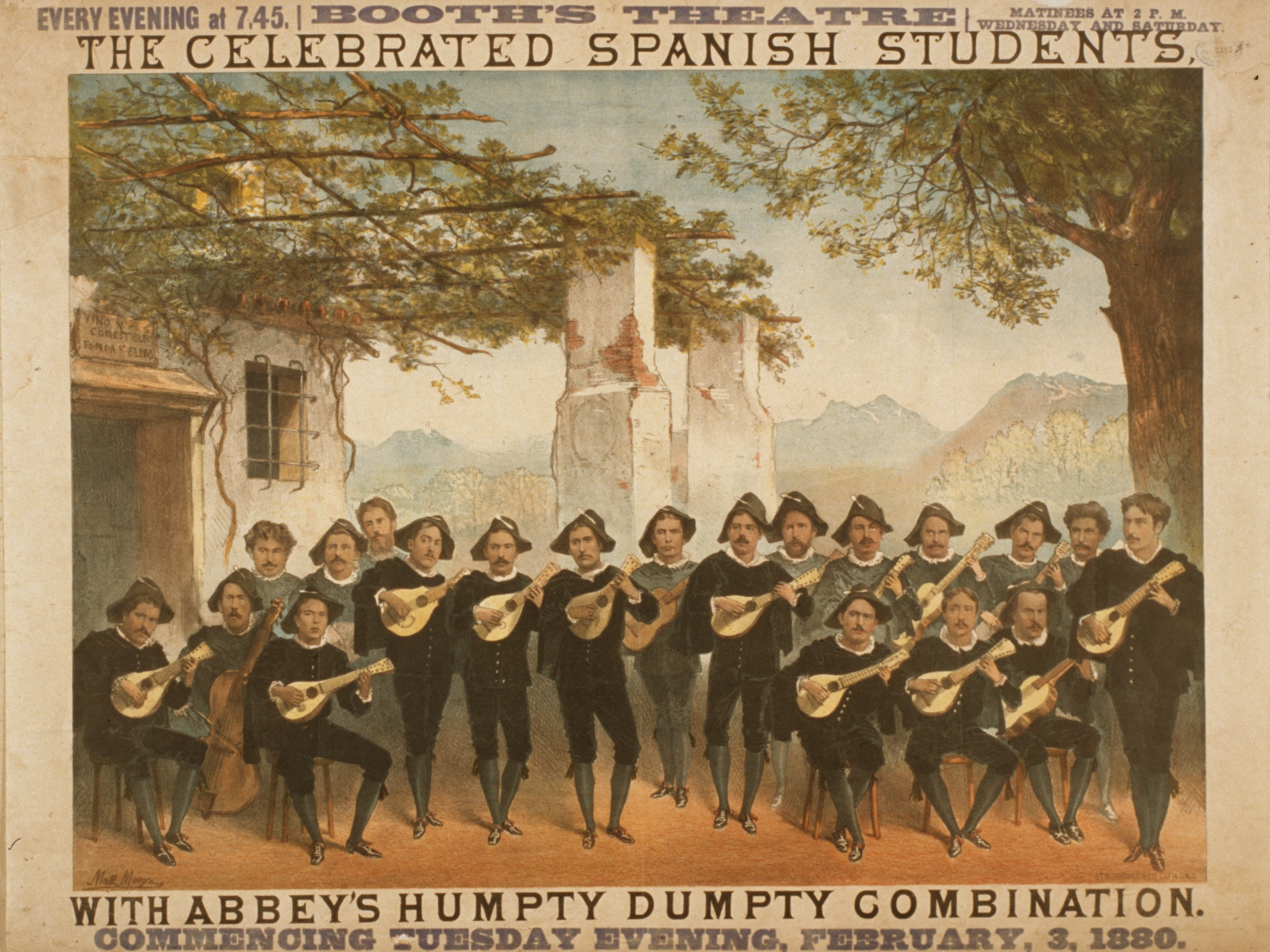
One of Morgan's works, an advertisement poster for the Figaro Spanish Students. The artwork catches a glimpse of history being made and culture changing, as the Spanish Students toured the United States with their guitars and Bandurrias. During the interest in them, there was confusion about their bandurrias, and the final result was the mandolin becoming a well-known musical instrument in the United States.

He came to the United States in 1870 under an engagement with Frank Leslie, and, after working as caricaturist on Leslie's publications, acted as manager of several New York theatres. His greatest fame came during the 1872 presidential campaign, when Morgan drew cartoons on behalf of the Liberal Republicans against President Ulysses S. Grant. Hired as a rival to the Republican cartoonist Thomas Nast at Harper's Weekly, Morgan showed much the same caustic satire, but lacked the humor and wit that Nast employed. His caricatures of politicians he approved of were more like portraiture. By 1874, 'Leslie's Illustrated Weekly' was using Morgan's cartoons only sporadically, and relying more on those of Joseph Keppler, but Morgan continued to do illustrations of events and American scenes. He went in 1880 to Cincinnati, Ohio, where he was manager of the Strobridge Lithographing Company until 1885, and did much to improve the character of theatrical lithography. He also founded the Matt Morgan Art Pottery Company there in 1883, and the Cincinnati Art Students' League. Reportedly he also helped design sets for Buffalo Bill's Wild West Show.

He returned to New York City in 1887. Morgan contributed to the exhibitions of the American Watercolor Society, and painted a series of large panoramic pictures, representing battles of the Civil War, which were exhibited in Cincinnati in 1886 and elsewhere.

Morgan died of pericarditis and pleurisy in New York City on 2 June 1890.

== Gallery ==
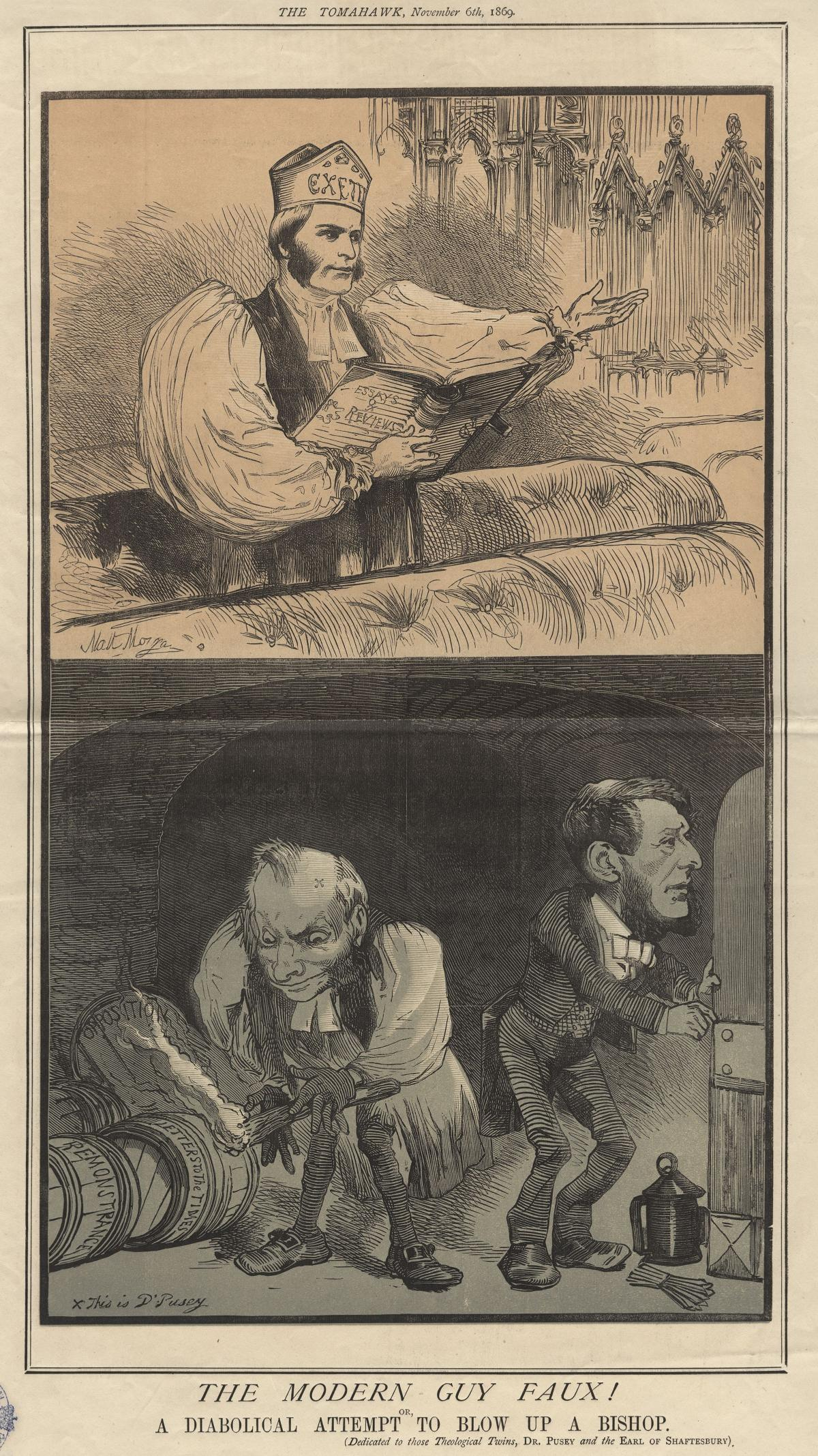
1869

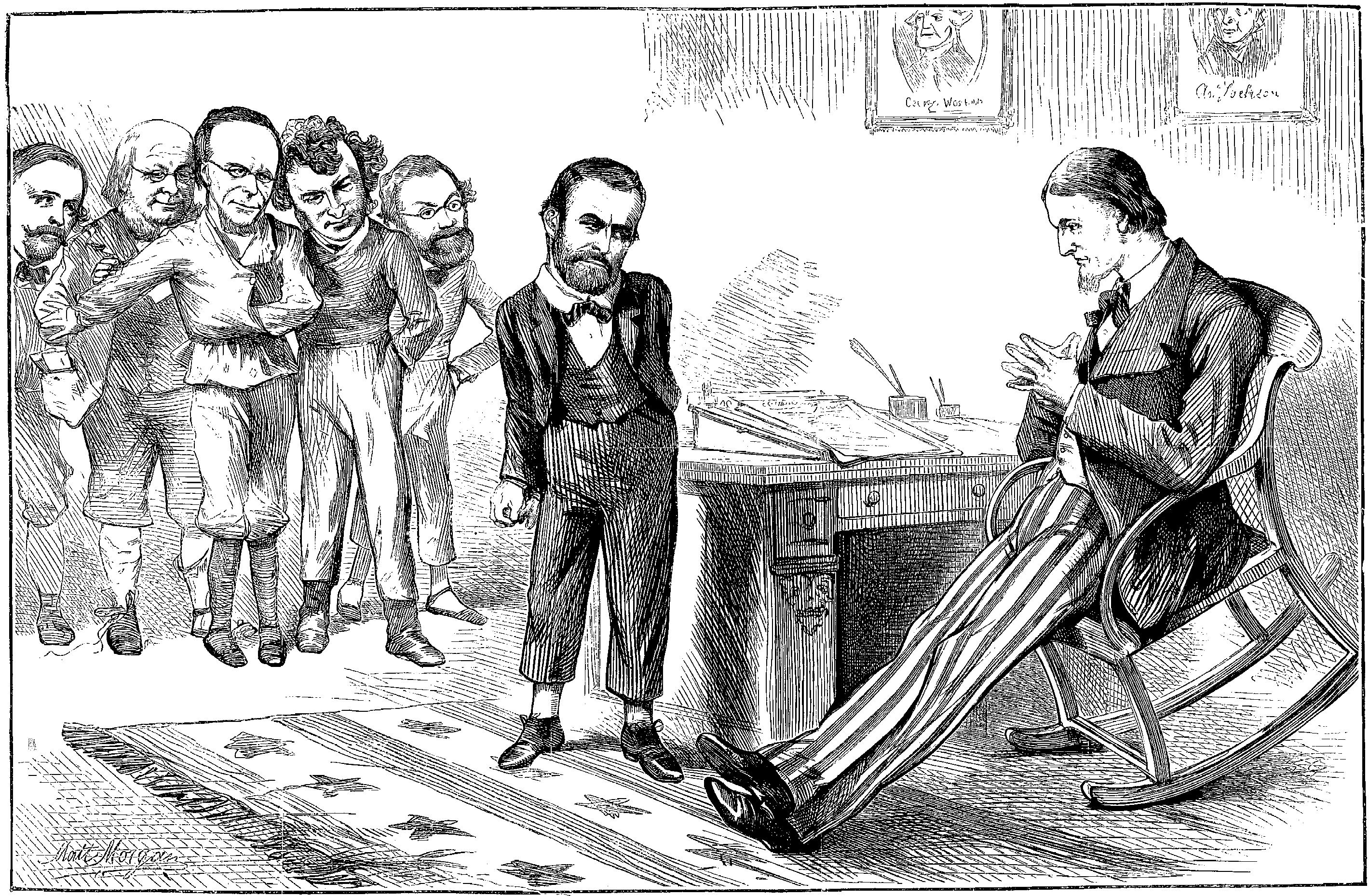
1872

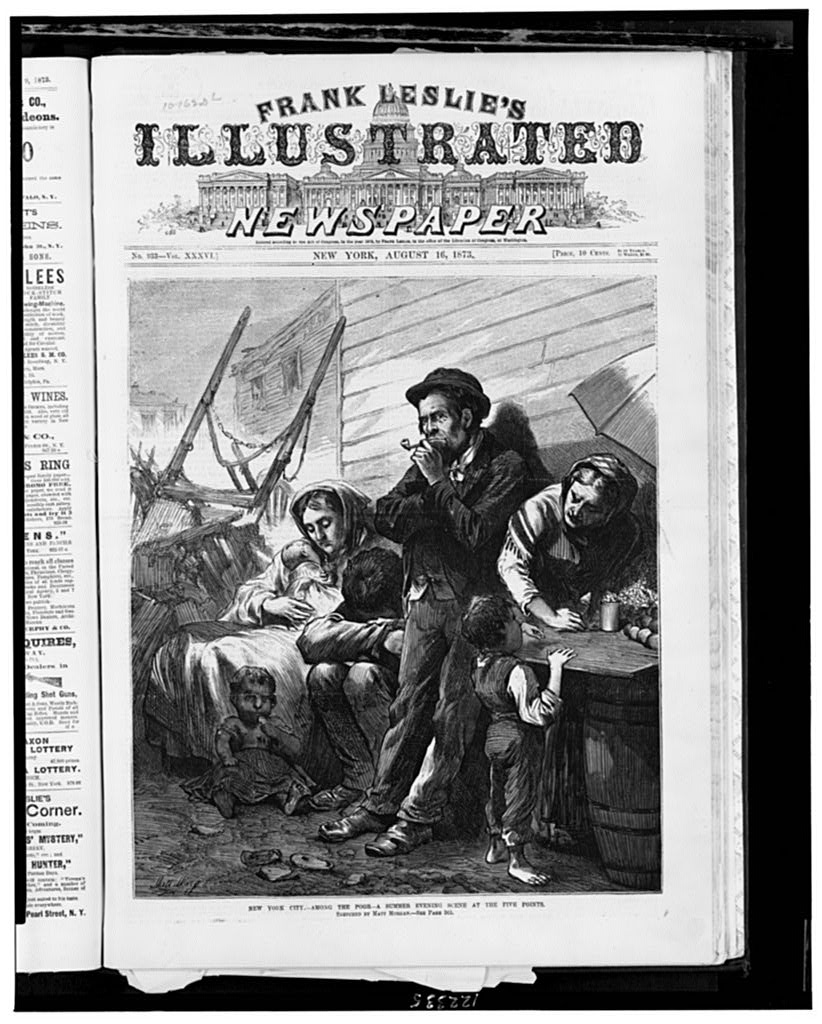
1873

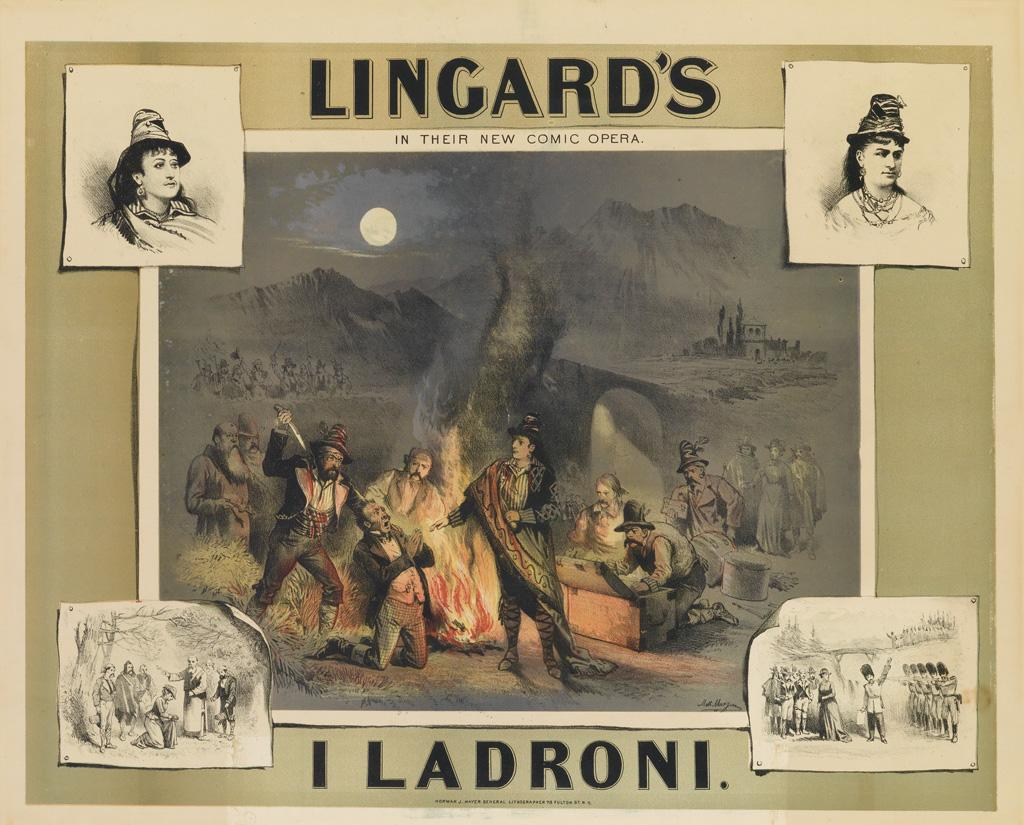
1873. Poster for Lingard's comic opera I Ladroni.

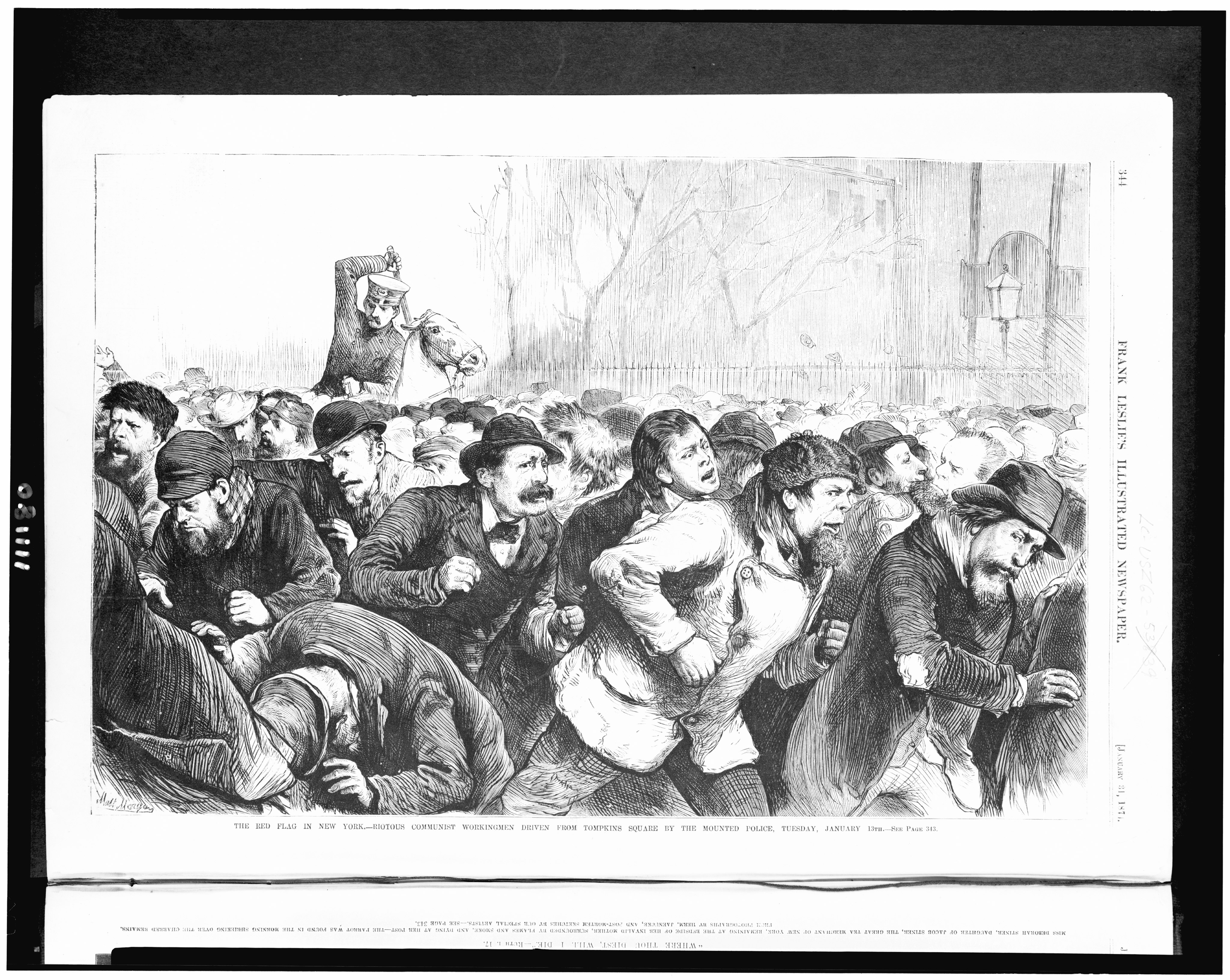
1874. Tompkins square riot, published in Frank Leslie's illustrated newspaper

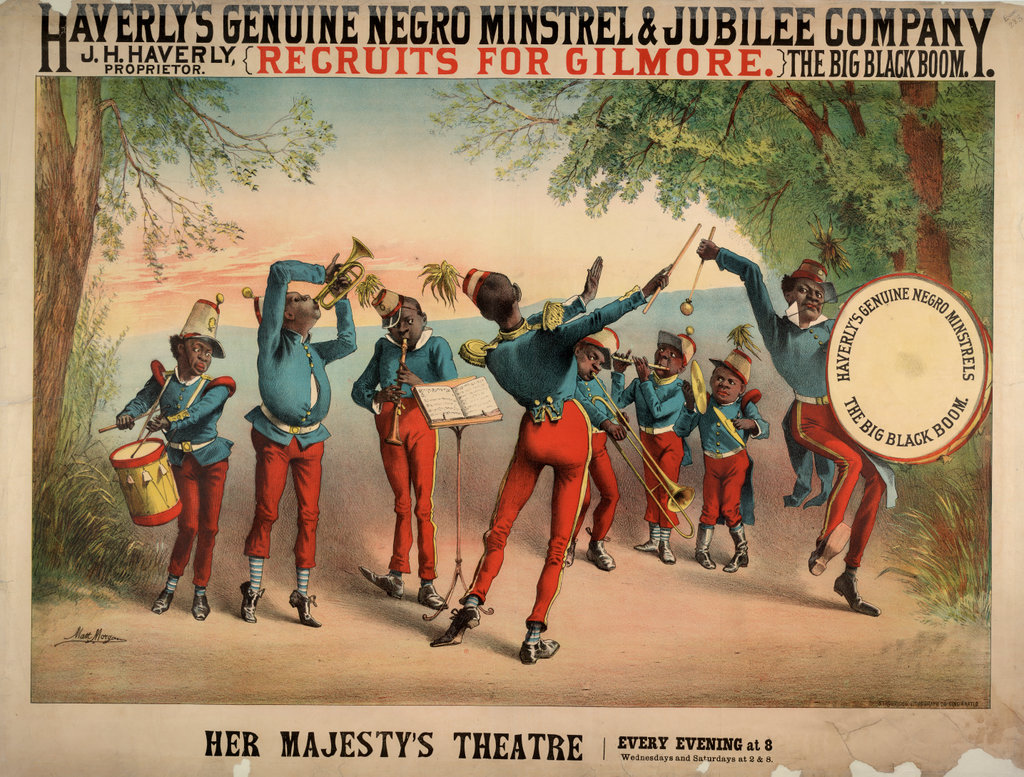
1878. Theater poster, J. H. Haverly's Genuine Negro Minstrel & Jubilee Company, Recruits for Gilmore, playing at Her Majesty's Theater, c. 1878

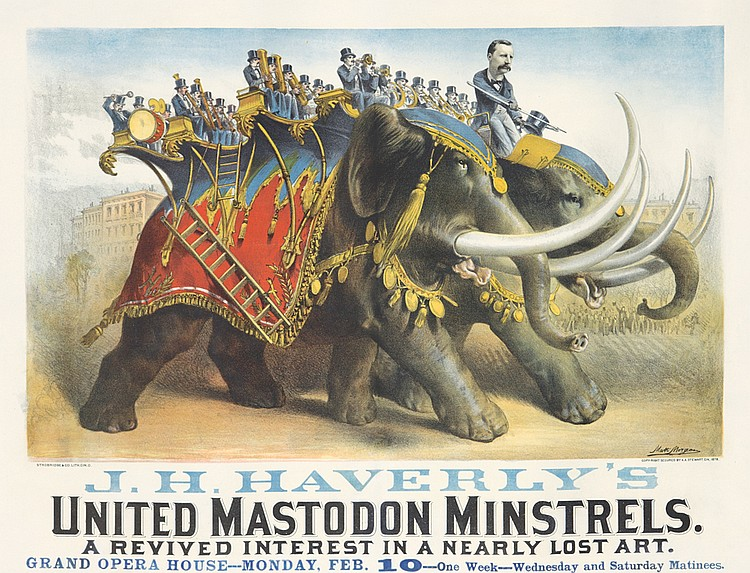
1878. J. H. Haverly's United Mastodon Minstrels, theater poster

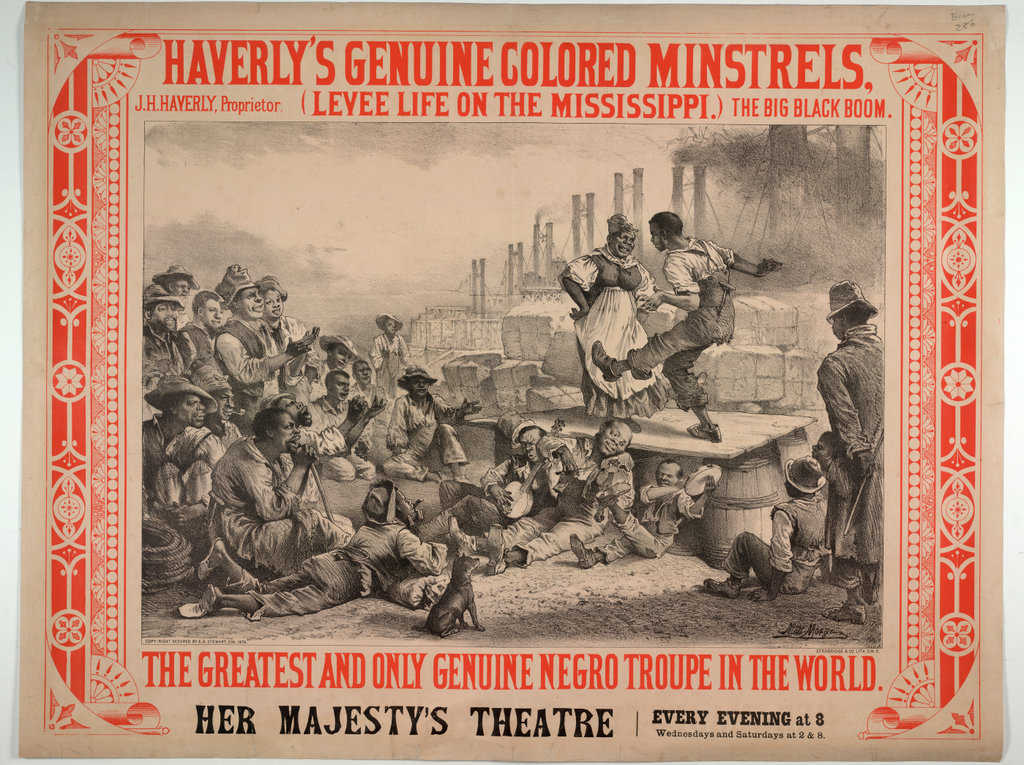
1878. Theater poster for J. H. Haverly's Genuine Colored Minstrels, Levee Life on the Mississippi, performing at Her Majesty's Theater

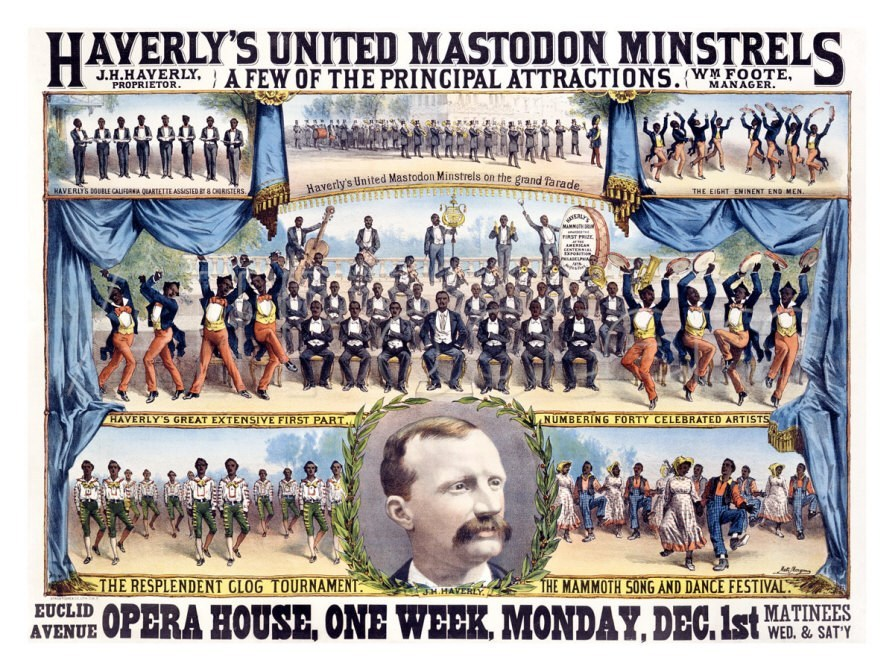
c. 1879. Theater poster for Haverly's United Mastodon Minstrels.

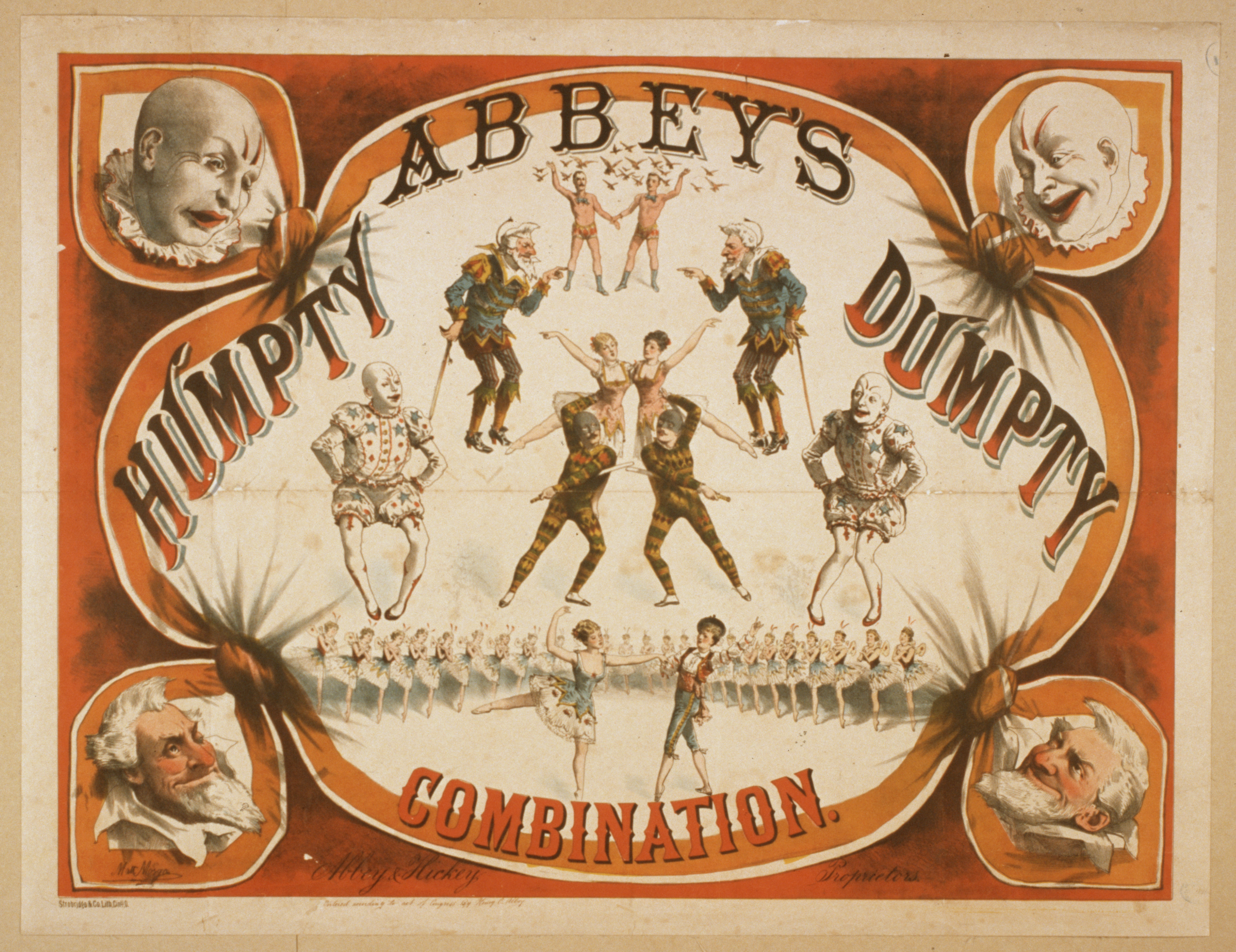
1879. Theater poster with Matt Morgan’s artwork for Abbey and Hickey's Humpty Dumpty, showing the show's harlequinade characters and other acts (1879).

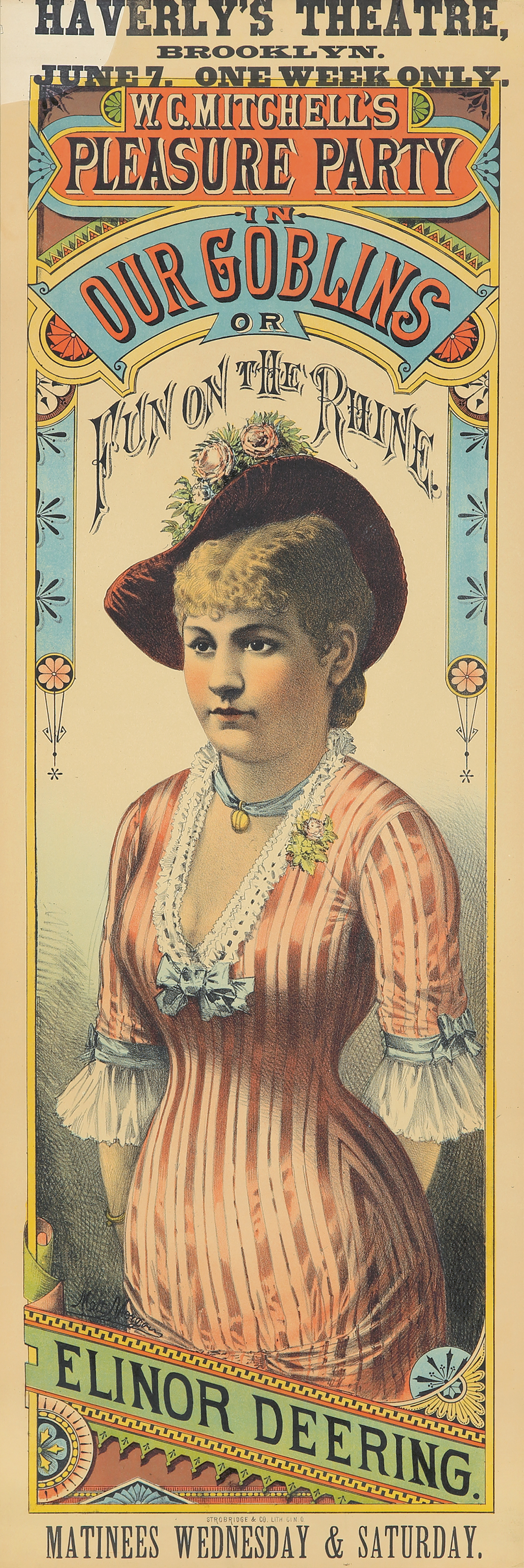
c. 1880. Theater poster, Haverly's Theater, production Elinor Deering stars in W. C. Mitchell's Our Goblins, or Fun on the Rhine.

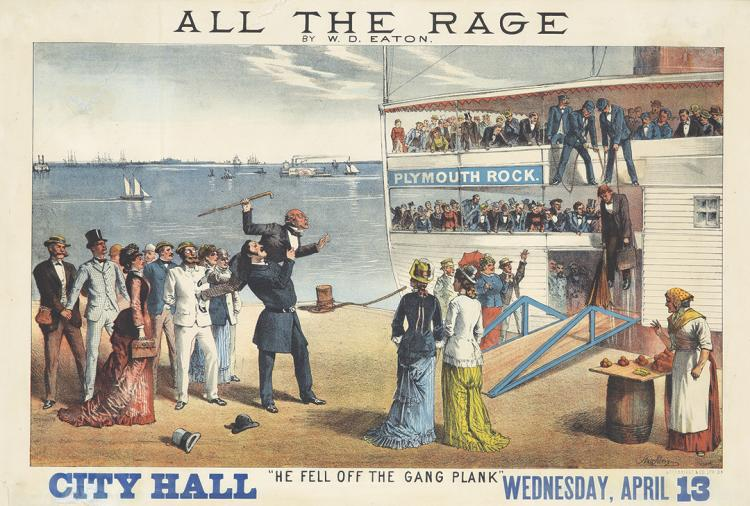
1881. Theater poster for All the Rage by W. D. Eaton

== Notes ==
- Scully, Richard. Eminent Victorian Cartoonists, Volume II: The Rivals of Mr Punch. London: Political Cartoon Society, 2018
- Sparks, Paul (2003). The Classical Mandolin. Oxford: Oxford University Press. ISBN 9780195173376.
