= Strobridge Lithographing Company =

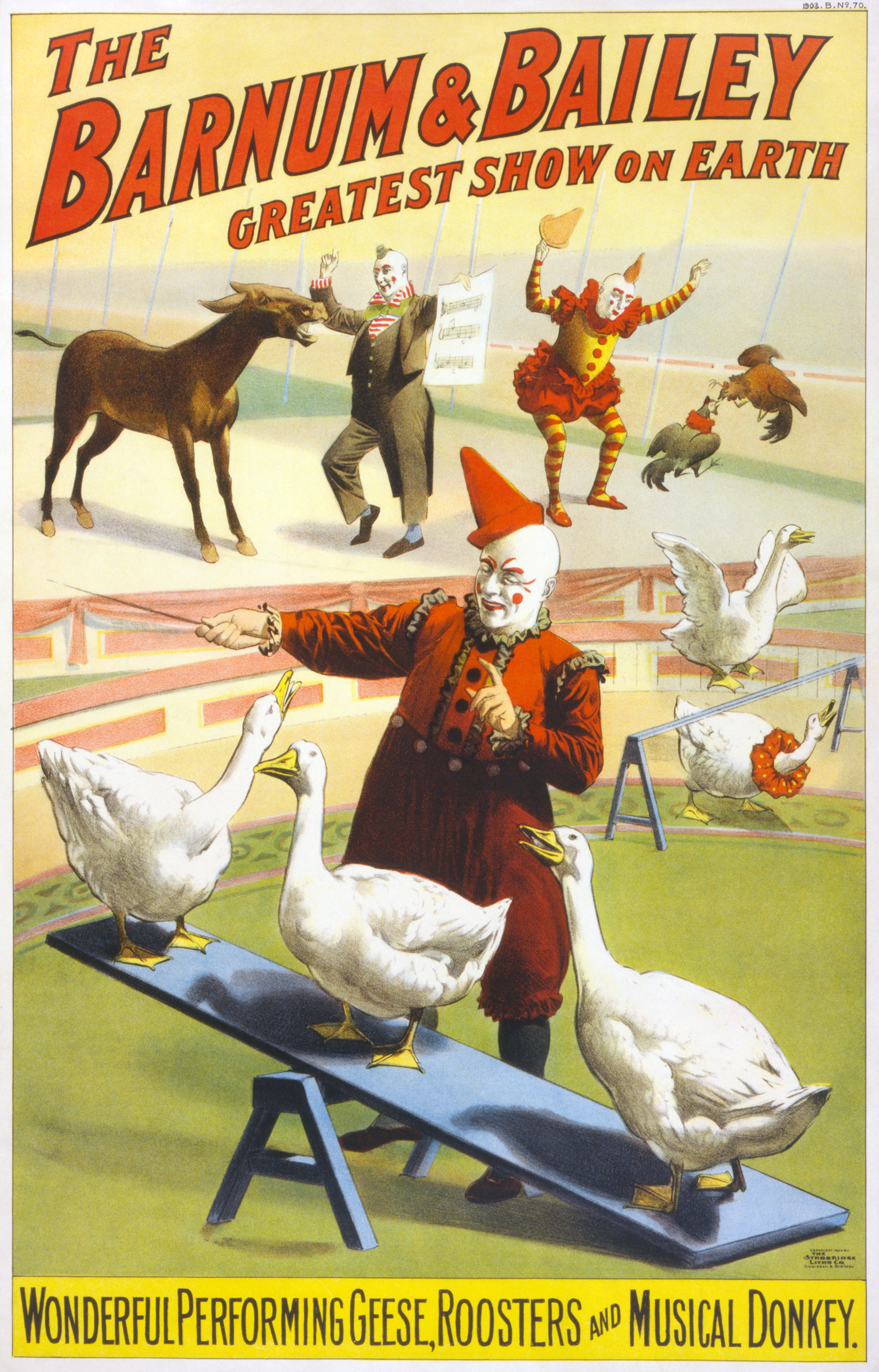
Strobridge Lithographing Company poster for Barnum & Bailey c. 1903

The Strobridge Lithographing Company was an American maker of advertisement posters and lithographs founded in 1847 in Cincinnati, Ohio. The company is named after Hines Strobridge who only joined the then stationery store in 1854 when it was known as Middleton, Wallace and Company, after its founding partners E. C. Middleton and W. R. Wallace. In 1859, the company changed its name to Middleton, Strobridge and Company. Strobridge acquired full ownership from his partners after the American Civil War. He built the company's first factory in 1884 on the Miami–Erie Canal in the Cincinnati neighborhood of Over-the-Rhine. Strobridge lithographs later became a popular method of advertisement for circuses and theaters, with designs by Mucha and Paul Jones, among others. Noted Cincinnati artist Harry Loud Bridwell was responsible for many of the company calendar cards used in advertising. Beginning in 1909 Strobridge was also employed by the American Tuberculosis Association to print Christmas Seals, which were sold at post offices to raise funding in the effort to contain tuberculosis. They continued in this capacity until 1958.
