= Gustave Doré =

French illustrator and painter (1832–1883)

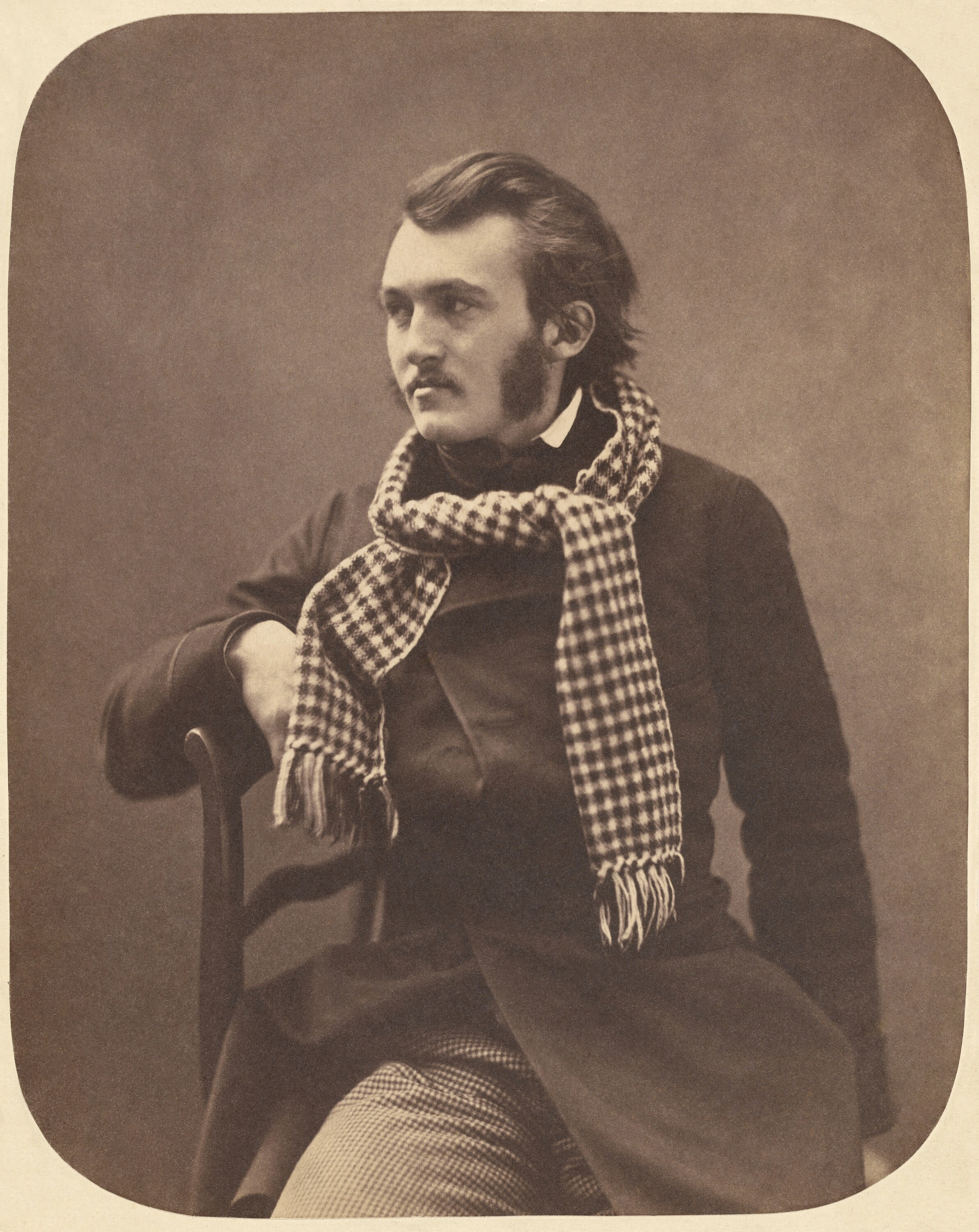
- Doré photographed by Nadar, c. 1856-58
- Born: Paul Gustave Louis Christophe Doré; 6 January 1832; Strasbourg, France
- Died: 23 January 1883 (aged 51); Paris, France
- Occupations: Illustrator and painter
- Known for: Painting, etching, illustrations
- Movement: Romanticism, symbolism

Signature
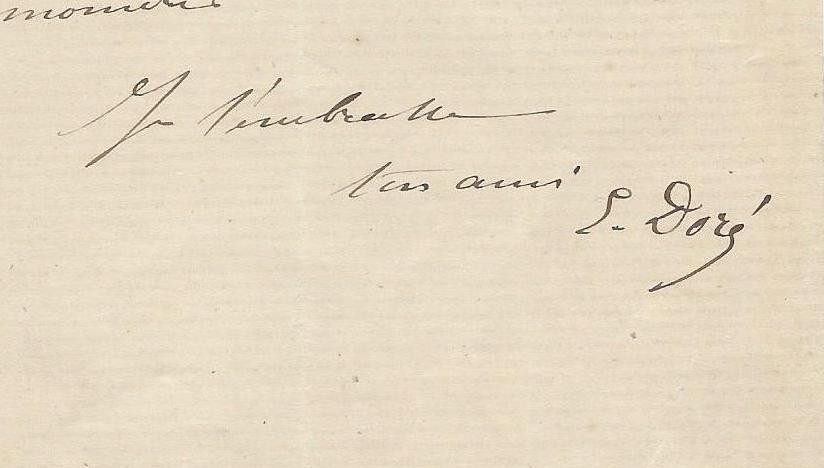

Paul Gustave Louis Christophe Doré (UK: /ˈdɔːreɪ/ DOR-ay, US: /dɔːˈreɪ/ dor-AY; French: [ɡystav dɔʁe]; 6 January 1832 – 23 January 1883) was a French artist. He is best known for his prolific output of wood-engravings illustrating classic literature, especially those for the Vulgate Bible and Dante's Divine Comedy. These achieved great international success, and he became renowned for printmaking, although his role was normally as the designer only; at the height of his career some 40 block-cutters were employed to cut his drawings onto the wooden printing blocks, usually also signing the image.

He created more than 10,000 illustrations, the most important of which were copied using an electrotype process using cylinder presses, allowing very large print runs to be published simultaneously in many countries.

Although Doré's work was popular with the general public during his life, it was met with mixed reviews from contemporary art critics. His work has been more widely celebrated in the centuries following his death. Among his admirers were writers H. P. Lovecraft and Théophile Gautier.

== Biography ==
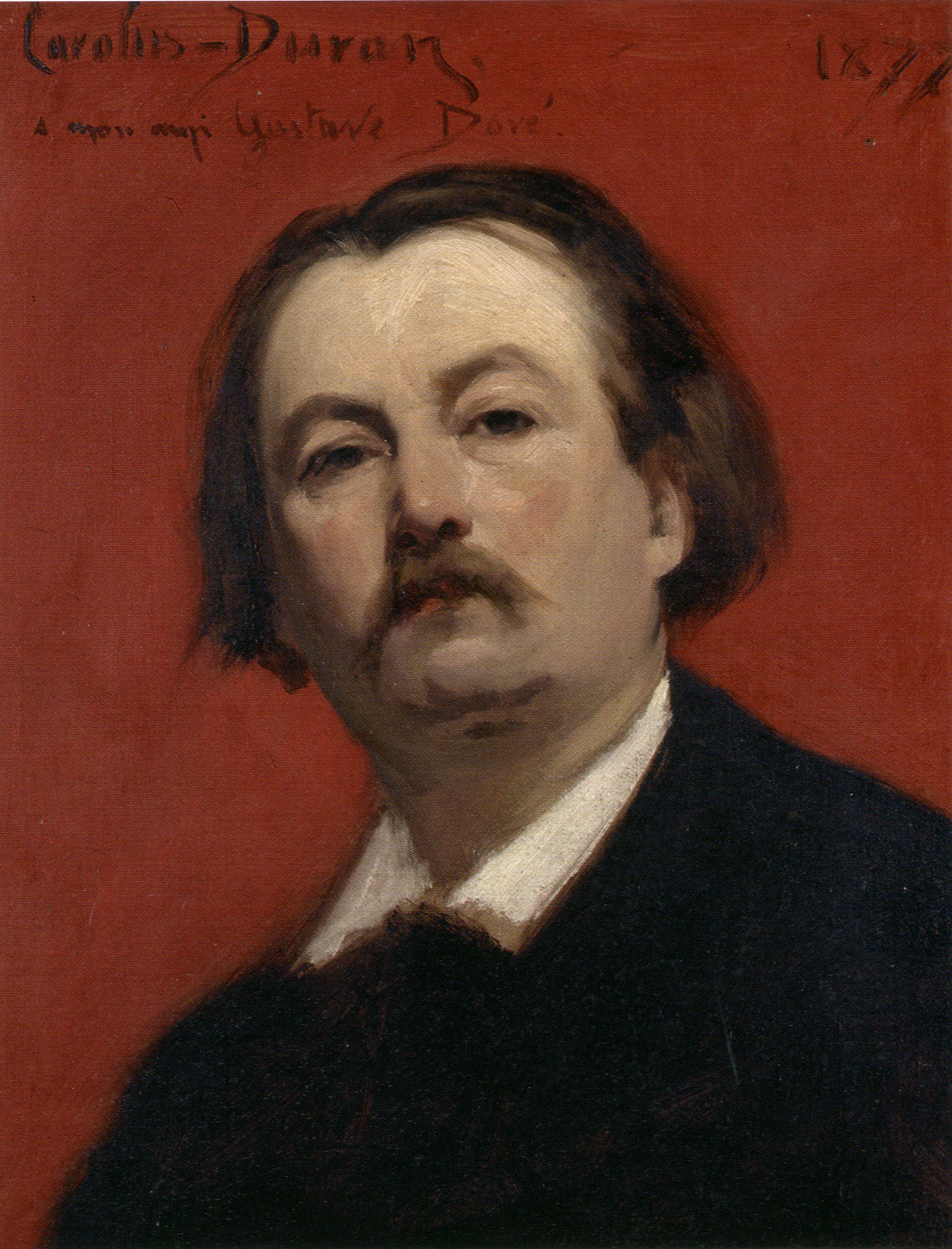
Doré by Carolus-Duran (1877)

Doré was born in Strasbourg on 6 January 1832. At the age of 15, he began his career working as a caricaturist for the French paper Le journal pour rire. The illustrations of J. J. Grandville have been noted as an influence on his work. Wood-engraving was his primary method at this time. In the late 1840s and early 1850s, he made several text comics, like Les Travaux d'Hercule (1847), Trois artistes incompris et mécontents (1851), Les Dés-agréments d'un voyage d'agrément (1851) and L'Histoire de la Sainte Russie (1854). Doré subsequently went on to win commissions to depict scenes from books by Cervantes, Rabelais, Balzac, Milton, and Dante.

In 1853, Doré was asked to illustrate the works of Lord Byron. This commission was followed by additional work for British publishers, including a new illustrated Bible. In 1854, he illustrated Gargantua et Pantagruel. In 1856, he produced 12 folio-size illustrations of The Legend of The Wandering Jew, which propagated longstanding antisemitic views of the time, for a short poem which Pierre-Jean de Béranger had derived from a novel of Eugène Sue of 1845.

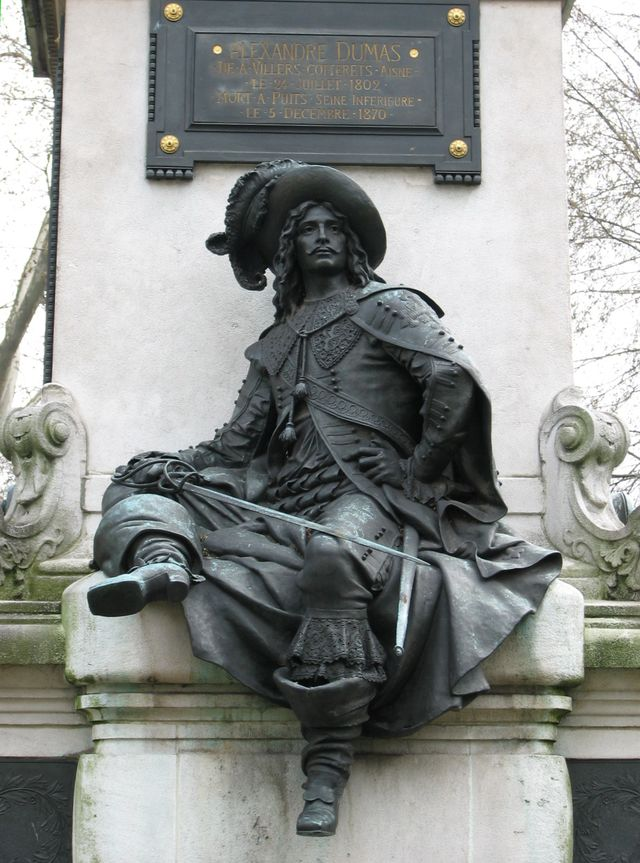
d'Artagnan on Doré's monument to Alexandre Dumas, père in Paris

In the 1860s, he illustrated a French edition of Cervantes's Don Quixote, and his depictions of the knight and his squire, Sancho Panza, became so famous that they influenced subsequent readers, artists, and stage and film directors' ideas of the physical "look" of the two characters. Doré also illustrated an oversized edition of Edgar Allan Poe's "The Raven", an endeavor that earned him 30,000 francs from publisher Harper & Brothers in 1883.

The government of France made him a Knight of the Legion of Honour in 1861.

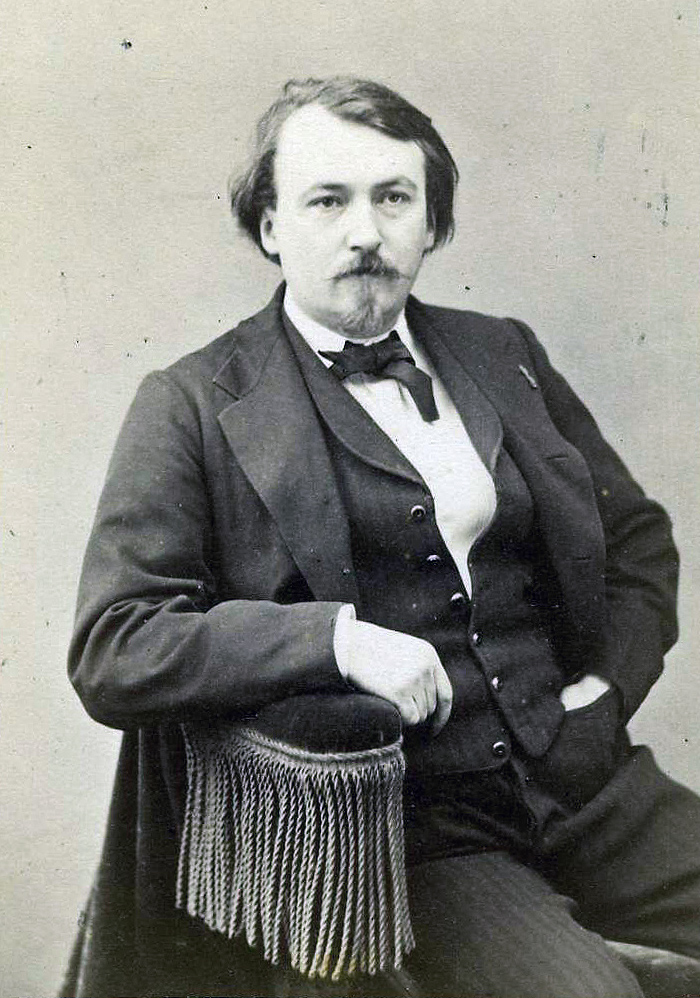
Doré in 1867 by Nadar

Doré's illustrations for the Bible (1866) were a great success, and in 1867 he had a major exhibition of his work in London. This exhibition led to the foundation of the Doré Gallery in Bond Street, London. In 1869, Blanchard Jerrold, the son of Douglas William Jerrold, suggested that they work together to produce a comprehensive portrait of London. Jerrold had obtained the idea from The Microcosm of London produced by Rudolph Ackermann, William Pyne, and Thomas Rowlandson (published in three volumes from 1808 to 1810). Doré signed a five-year contract with the publishers Grant & Co that involved his staying in London for three months a year, and he received the vast sum of £10,000 a year for the project. Doré was celebrated for his paintings in his day, but his wood-engravings, like those he did for Jerrold, are where he excelled as an artist with an individual vision.

The completed book London: A Pilgrimage, with 180 wood engravings, was published in 1872. It enjoyed commercial and popular success, but the work was disliked by some contemporary British critics, as it appeared to focus on the poverty that existed in parts of London. Doré was accused by The Art Journal of "inventing rather than copying." The Westminster Review claimed that "Doré gives us sketches in which the commonest, the vulgarest external features are set down." But they impressed Vincent van Gogh, who painted a version of the Prisoners' Round in 1890, the year of his death. The book was a financial success, however, and Doré received commissions from other British publishers.

Doré's later work included illustrations for new editions of Coleridge's Rime of the Ancient Mariner, Milton's Paradise Lost, Tennyson's Idylls of the King, The Works of Thomas Hood, and The Divine Comedy. Doré's work also appeared in the weekly newspaper The Illustrated London News.

The medical doctor Jean-Baptiste Fuzier, who was a specialist in yellow fever and other tropical diseases, bequeathed watercolor paintings by Doré to the museum of Grenoble in 1880. According to the Musée de Grenoble, Doré developed his expertise as a watercolorist during a trip to Scotland in 1873.

== Death ==
Doré never married and, following the death of his father in 1849, he continued to live with his mother, illustrating books until his death of a heart attack in Paris on January 23, 1883, following a short illness. At the time of his death Doré was working on illustrations for an edition of Shakespeare's plays.

== Works ==
Doré was a prolific artist; thus the following list of works is not complete and it does not include his paintings, sculptures, and many of his journal illustrations:

Date	Author	Work	Volumes / Format	Illustrations	Publisher	Ref.
1854	Gustave Doré	Histoire pittoresque dramatique et caricaturale de la Sainte Russie, d'après les chroniqueurs et historiens Nestor Nikan Sylvestre Karamsin Ségur etc.	1 vol.	500	Paris: de Bry	
1854	Rabelais	Oeuvres contenant la vie de Gargantua et celle de Pantagruel ...	1 vol. 4to.	Frontis. & 15	J.Bry Ainé, Paris	
1855	Honoré de Balzac	Les Contes Drôlatiques		425	Société Générale de la Libraire, and in Le Journal pour Tous	
1855	Jules Gérard	La Chasse au Lion	1 vol. 12mo.	11	Librairie Nouvelle	
1856		Fierabras d'Alexandrie, Légende Nationale traduite par Mary Lafon	1 vol in 8vo	123	Librairie Nouvelle	
1856	Victor Percival	Mémoires d'un Jeune Cadet, par Victor Percival		48		
1856		La Légende du Juif Errant	1 vol. grand in folio	12 Image:Wandering jew title page.jpg	Michel Lévy	
1857	Dante Alighieri	L'Enfer		75		
1857 autumn	Ed. de La Bédollière	Nouveau Paris, Histoire de ses 20 Arrondissements	1 vol in 4to	150	Barba	
1857 autumn	Valéry Vernier	Aline, Journal d'un Jeune Homme		one large page	Dentu	
1860–1862	Thomas Mayne Reid	L'Habitation du Désert	1 vol. in 16mo	60	Hachette	
1860–1862	Ann S. Stevens	La Fille du Grand Chieftain	1 vol.	15		
1860–1862	M. V. Victor	Flêche d'Or	1 vol.	13		
1860–1862	E. S. Ellis	L'Ange des Frontières	1 vol.	10		
1860–1862	N. W. Buxted	Les Vierges de la Forêt	1 vol.	10		
1860	William Shakespeare	The Tempest	1 vol. in 4to		(London)	
1861		Les Figures du Temps	1 vol. in 12mo		(Paris)	
1861	Plouvier and Vincent	Les Chansons d'Autrefois	in 12mo		Coulon and Pineau, Paris	
1861	Edmond About	Le Roi des Montagnes	1 vol. in 8vo	157	Hachette and Co., Paris	
1862	Saintine	Les Mythologies du Rhin	1 vol. in 8vo	165	Hachette and Co., Paris	
1862	L'Abbé Léon Godard	L'Espagne, Mœurs et Paysages	2 vols in 8vo	4 Image:Moeurs et paysages title page.jpg	Alfred Mame et Fils, Tours Image:Moeurs et paysages title page.jpg or Paris	
1862	Malte-Brun	Les États Unis et le Mexique	1 vol. in 4to		Brun, Paris	
1862		Histoire aussi intéressante qu'invraisemblable de l'intrépide Capitaine Castagnette, neveu de l'Homme à la Tête de Bois	1 vol. in 4to	43	Hachette	
1862	Charles Perrault	Les Contes de Perrault		11		
1862		Aventures du Baron de Münchausen, traduction nouvelle par Théophile Gautier fils	1 vol.		(Paris, Charles Furne)	
1863	M. Épiné	Légende de Croquemitaine	1 vol. in 4to	177	Hachette	
1863	Gastineau	La Chasse au Lion et à la Panthère	1 vol. in 8vo		Hachette and Co.	
1863	Miguel de Cervantes	Don Quixote de la Mancha translation by Louis Viardot	2 vols. folio	370	Hachette and Co., Paris, and Cassell and Co., London	
1863	Charles Perrault	Les Contes de Perrault or in Spanish Los Cuentos de Perrault		100+	Hetzels. in Spanish by Ledouse	
1865	Gastineau	De Paris en Afrique	1 vol. in 12mo		(Paris)	
1865	A. Masse	L'Histoire d'un Minute	1 vol., 12mo		(Paris)	
1866	Victor Hugo	Travailleurs de la Mer			Sampson Low and Co., London	
1865	E. Edgar	Cressy and Poictiers	1 vol. in 8vo	50+	(London)	
1865	Thomas Moore	L'Épicurien (French translation)	in 8vo		(Paris)	
1865	Tom Hood	Fairy Realm	in folio		(London: Ward, Lock, and Tyler)	
1865	Quatrelles	Le Chevalier Beautemps	grand in 8vo		(Paris)	
1865	Chateaubriand	Atala	2 vols, grand folio	80	Hachette Edition	
1866	Théophile Gautier	Le Capitaine Fracasse	1 vol. grand in 8vo	60	Charpentier	
1866	G. La Bédollière	Histoire de la Guerre en Mexique	in 4to		(Paris)	
1866	Dante Alighieri	The Vision of Hell			London, Cassell, Petter, and Galpin	
1867	Dante Alighieri	Il Purgatorio ed il Paradiso			Hachette and Co.	
1866	X. B. Saintine	Le Chemin des Écoliers	1 vol. in 8vo	450 Image:Le chemin des ecoliers title page.jpg (not all by Doré)	Hachette and Co.	
1866		La Grande Bible de Tours, according to the Vulgate, new translation	2 vols. grand in folio	241	Mame, Tours; Cassell and Co., England	
1866	John Milton	Paradise Lost		50 Plates	Cassell and Co.	
1867	La Bédollière	La France et la Russie			(Paris)	
1867		Les Fables de Lafontaine	2 vols. in folio	8 large and 250 small plates	Hachette and Co.	
1867		Les Pays-bas et la Belgique	in 8vo		(Paris)	
1870	Thomas Hood	(Poems)	2 vols. in folio	9 Plates	Ward and Lock, London	
1873	Rabelais	New edition of Rabelais	2 vols. in folio		Paris : Garnier; London: Chatto and Windus	
1876	Louis Énault	London	1 vol. in 4to	174 wood-engravings	Hachette and Co.	
1874	Baron Ch. Davilliers	L'Espagne	in 4to	309 wood-engravings	Hachette and Co.; London: Sampson Low and Co.	
1875	Samuel Taylor Coleridge	The Rime of the Ancient Mariner	in folio	39 engraved plates and 3 vignettes	London: Doré Gallery	
1875	Michaud	Histoire des Croisades	2 vol. medium folio	100 grand compositions	Paris: Hachette and Co.	
	Alfred Tennyson	Idylls of the King				
1877	Ariosto	Orlando Furioso		36 drawings	Hachette and Co. (London: Ward and Lock)	
1884	Edgar Allan Poe	The Raven		26 steel engravings	London: Sampson Low and Co., New York: Harper and Co.	
1890	Gustave Doré	The Doré Bible Gallery		Illustrated by Gustave Doré	Philadelphia	

== Reception and legacy ==
Doré's work received mixed reviews from contemporary art critics, but he was widely acclaimed by the general public. He was adored by many writers and poets, who felt he "brought their wildest dreams and fantasies to life". Théophile Gautier for example stated "Nobody better than this artist can give a mysterious and deep vitality to chimeras, dreams, nightmares, intangible shapes bathed in light and shade, weirdly caricatured silhouettes and all the monsters of fantasy." H.P. Lovecraft drew inspiration from Doré's Rime of the Ancient Mariner illustrations in his formative years.

== Gallery ==
Illustrations

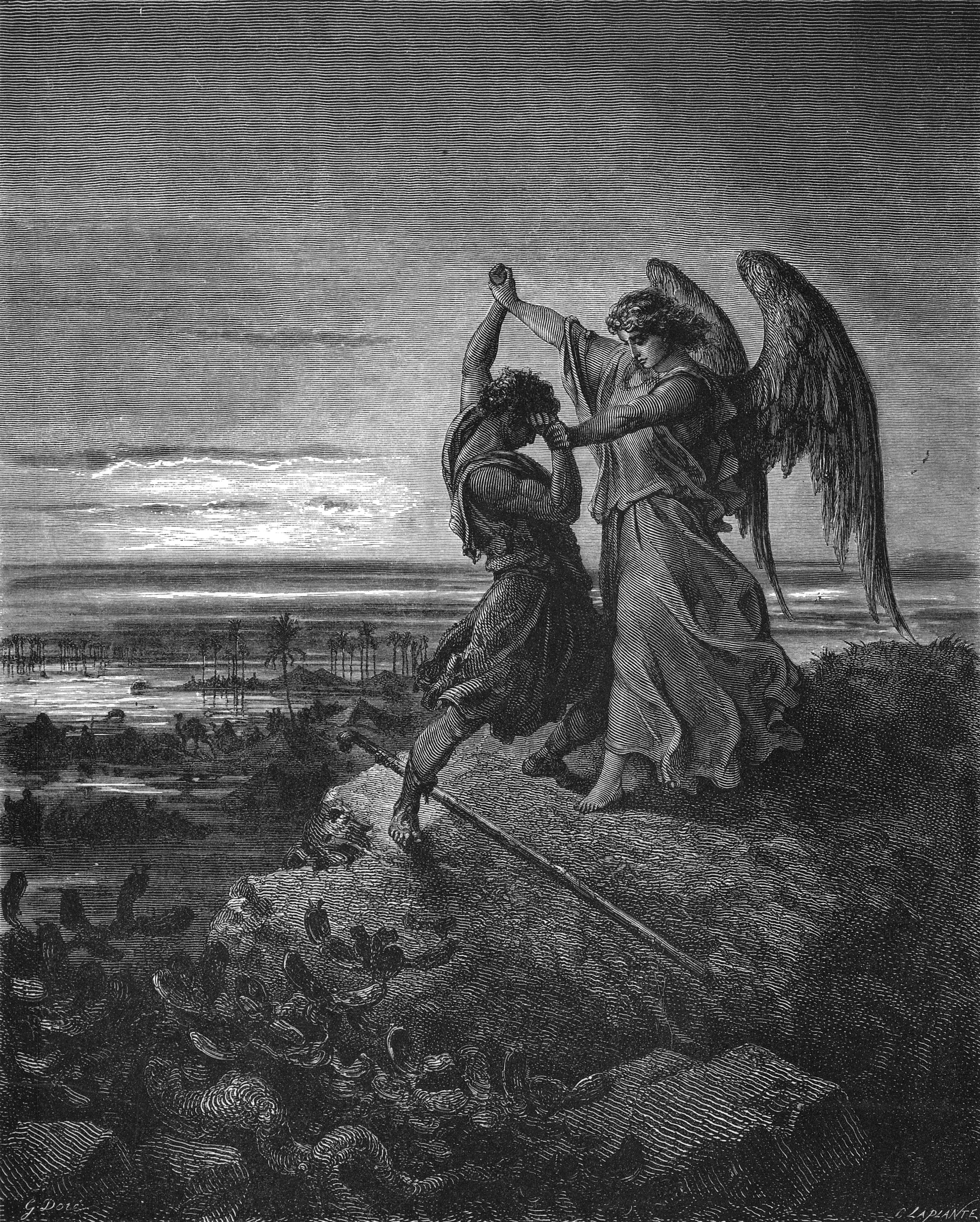
Jacob wrestling with the angel, 1855

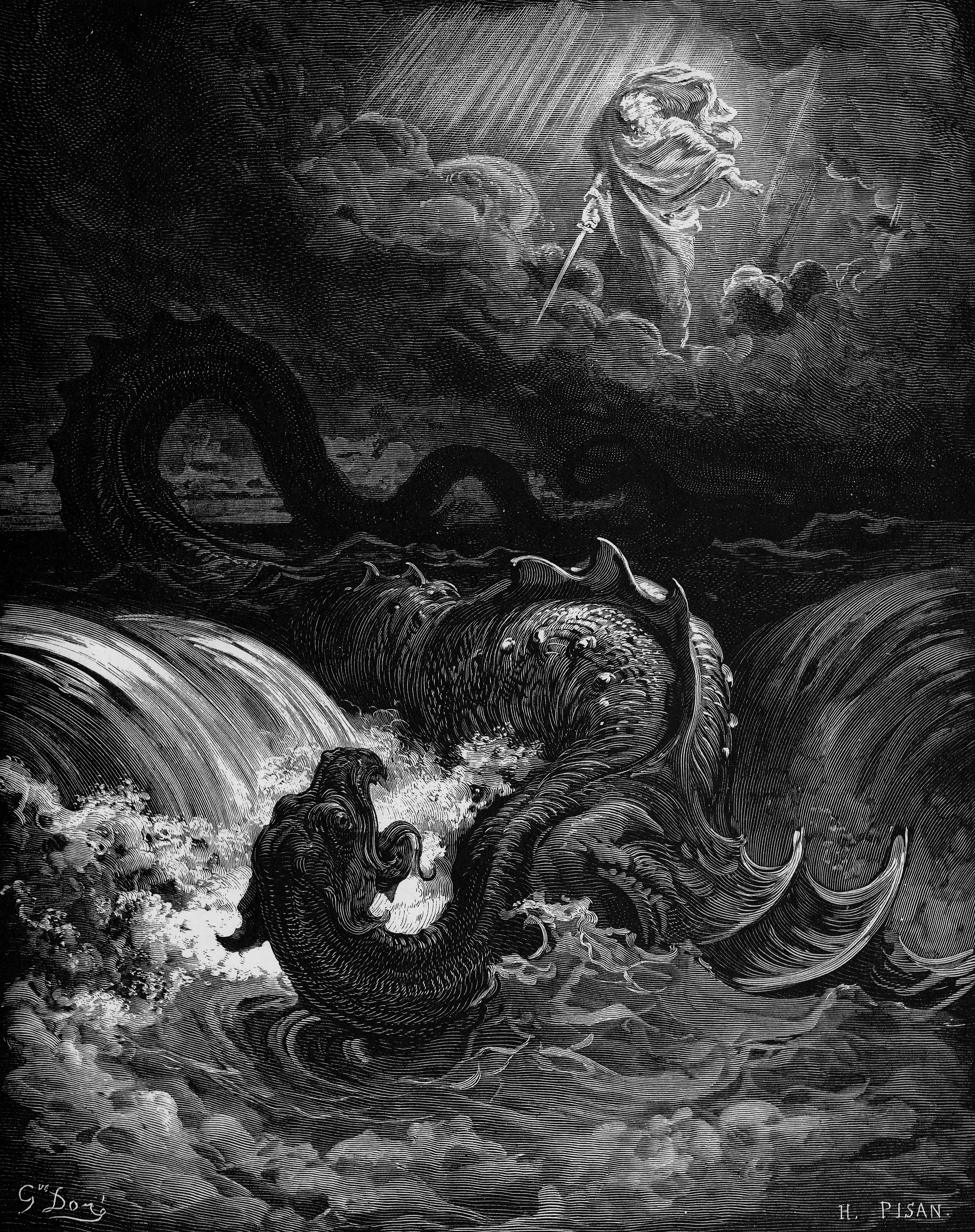
Destruction of Leviathan, 1865

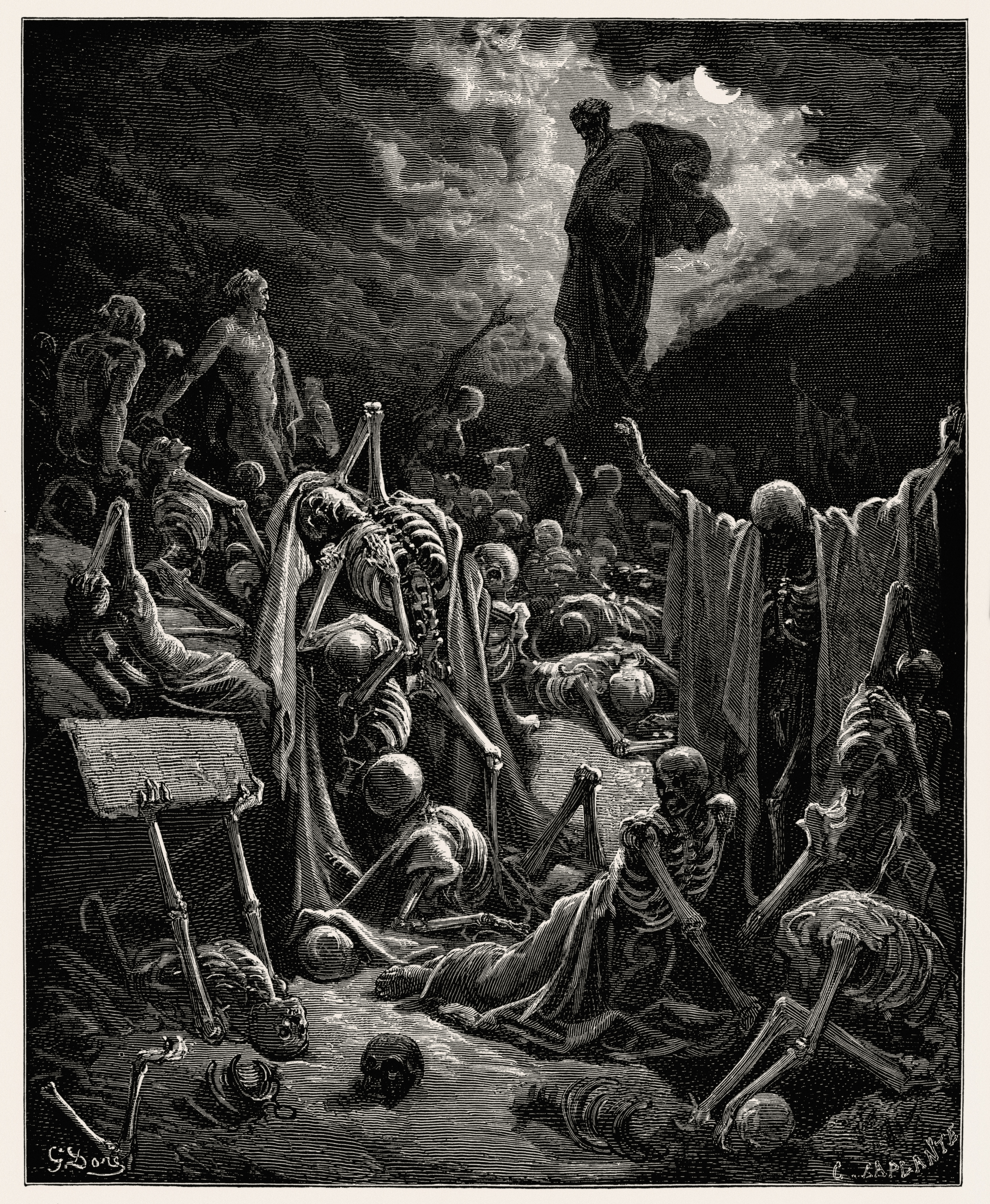
The Vision of The Valley of The Dry Bones, 1866

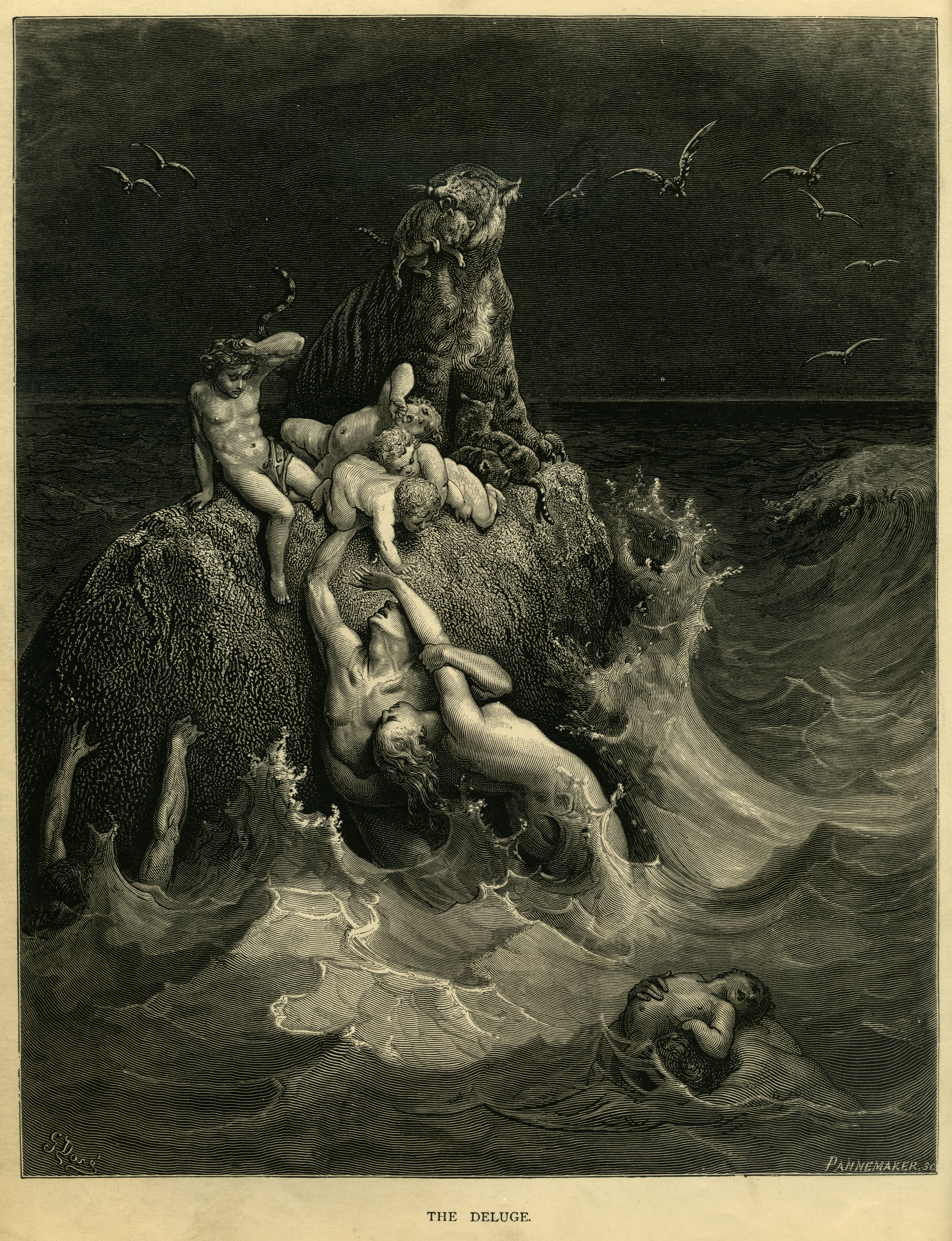
The Deluge, 1866

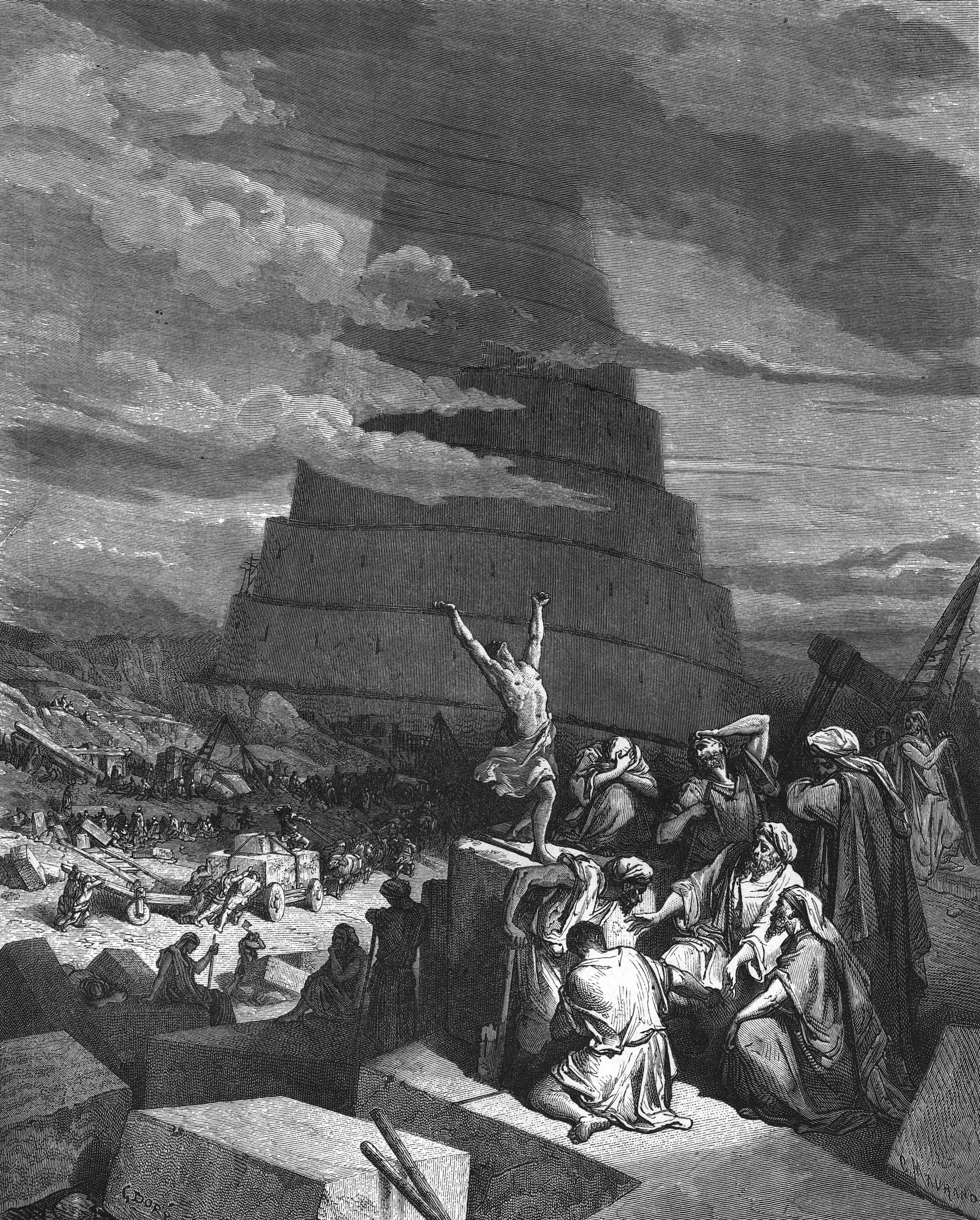
Engraving The Tower of Babel or the Confusion of Tongues, 1866

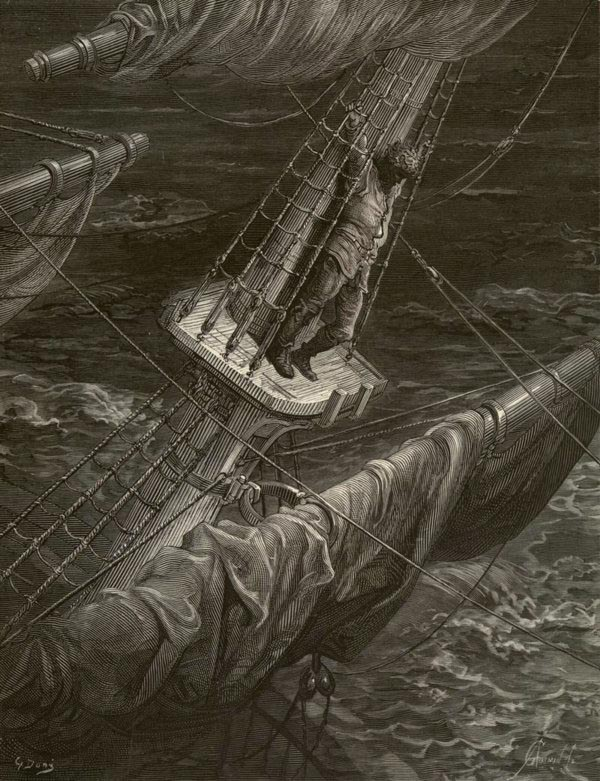
The Rime of the Ancient Mariner

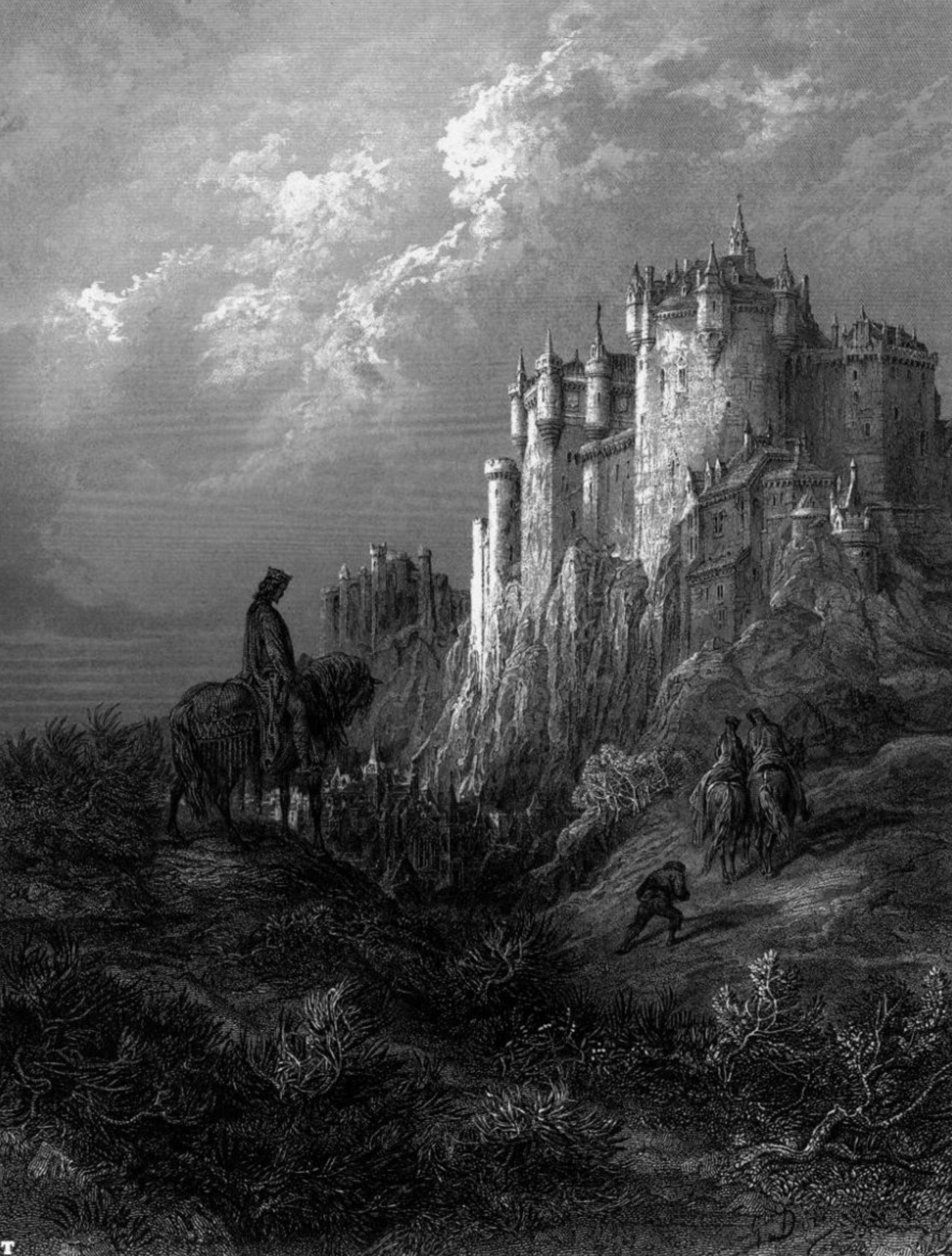
Edyrn with His Lady and Dwarf Journey to Arthur's Court, in Idylls of the King by Lord Alfred Tennyson, illustrated by Gustave Doré

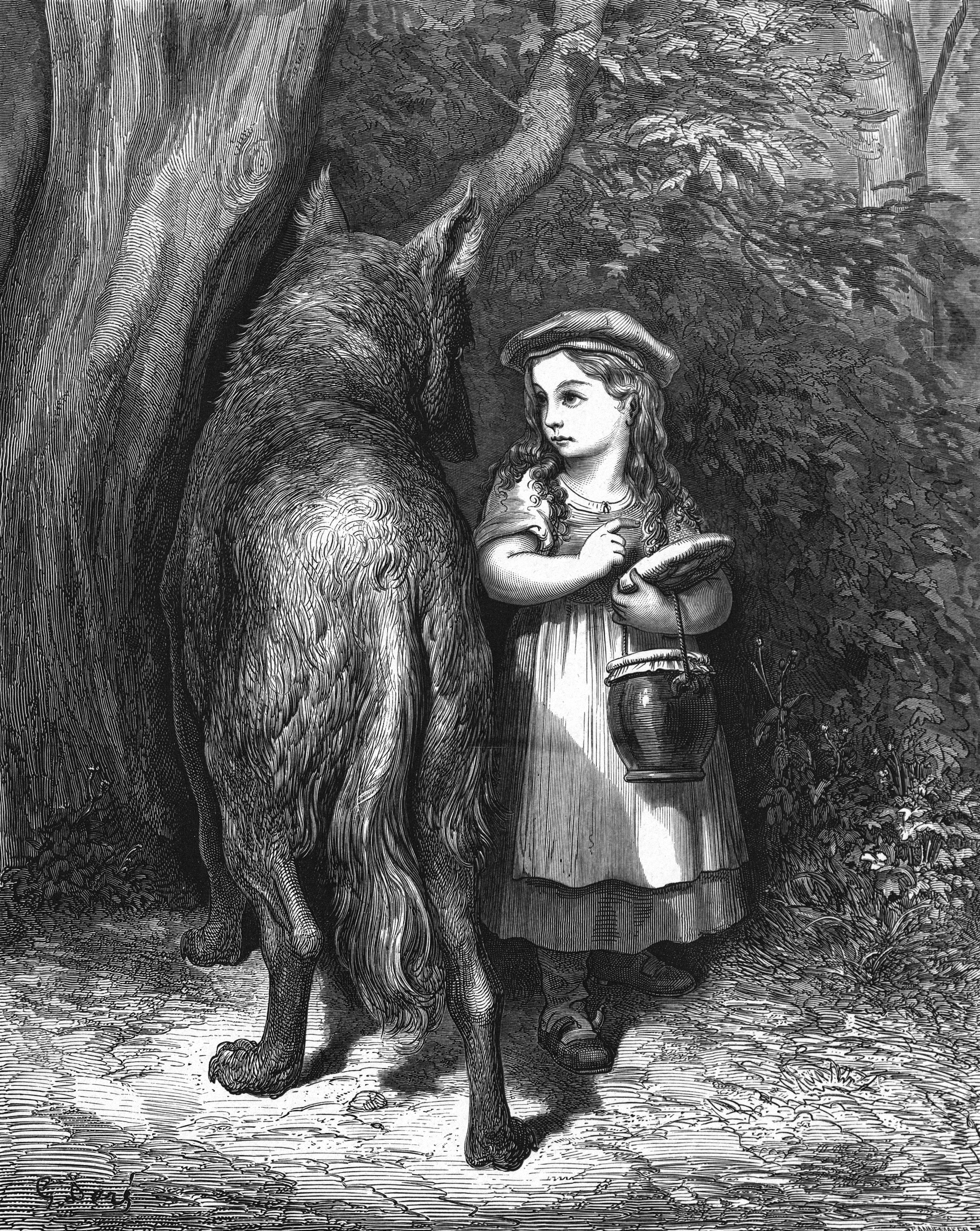
Little Red Riding Hood

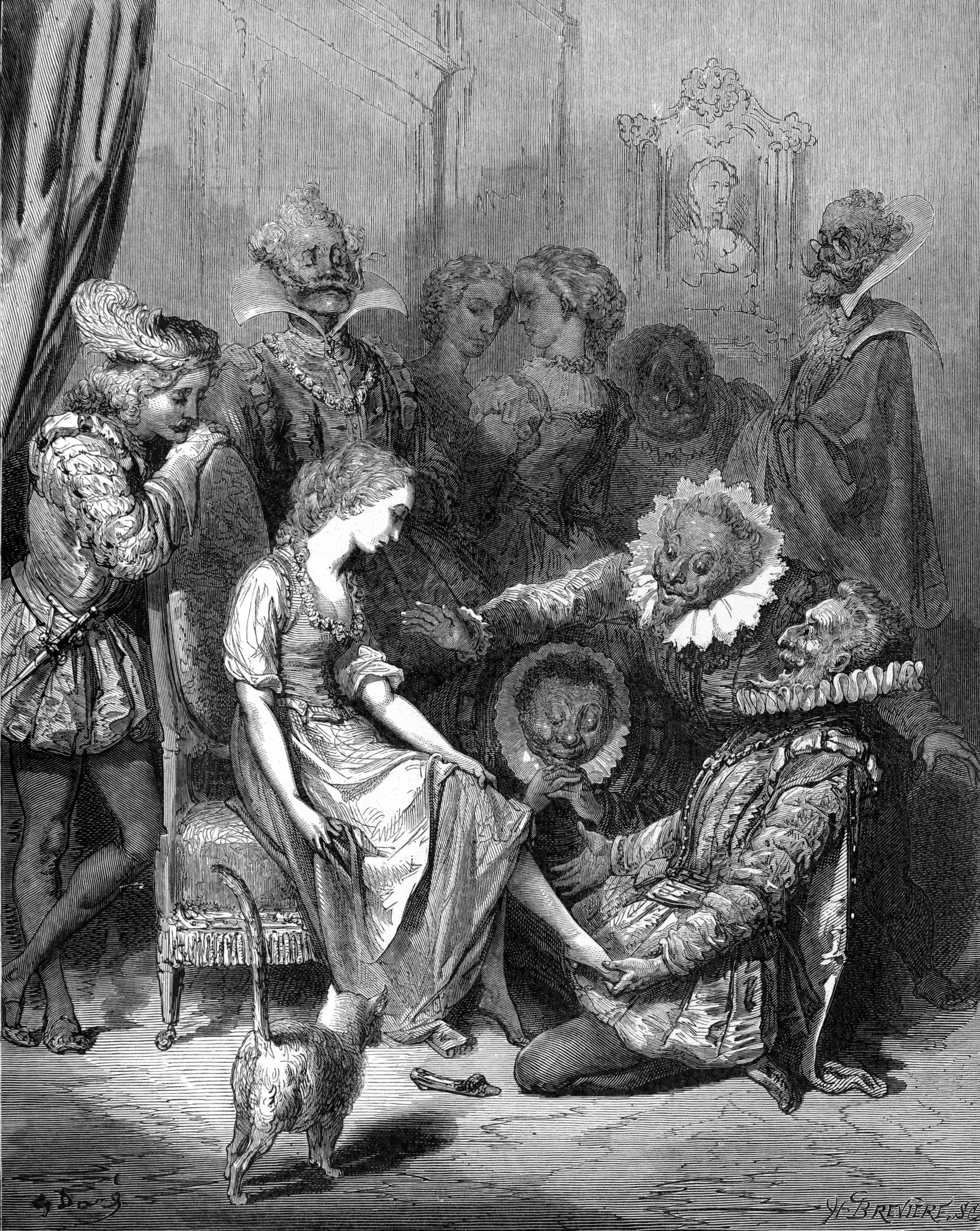
Doré illustrated several fairy tales: Cendrillon (or Cinderella)

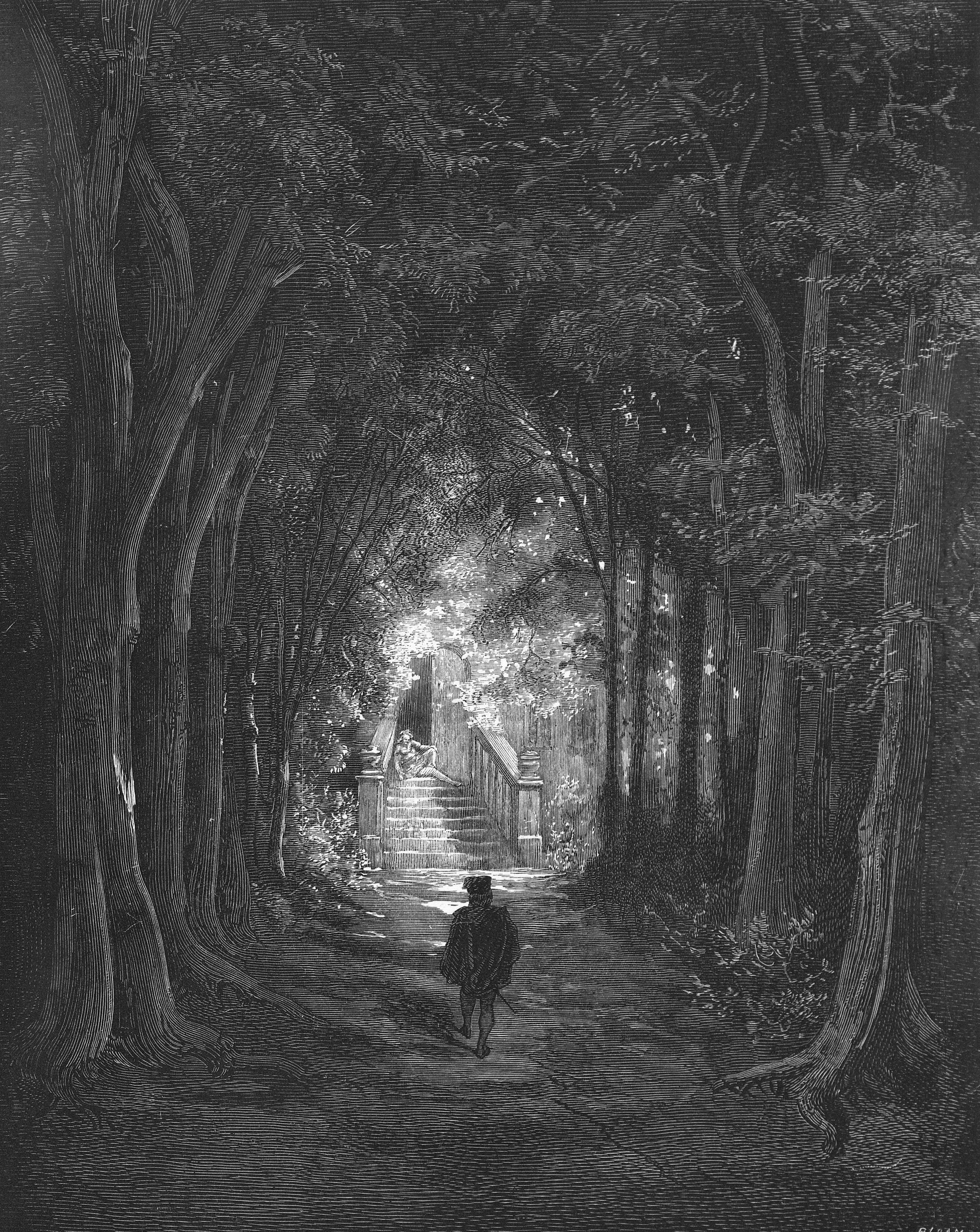
La Belle au Bois Dormant – third of six engravings by Gustave Doré

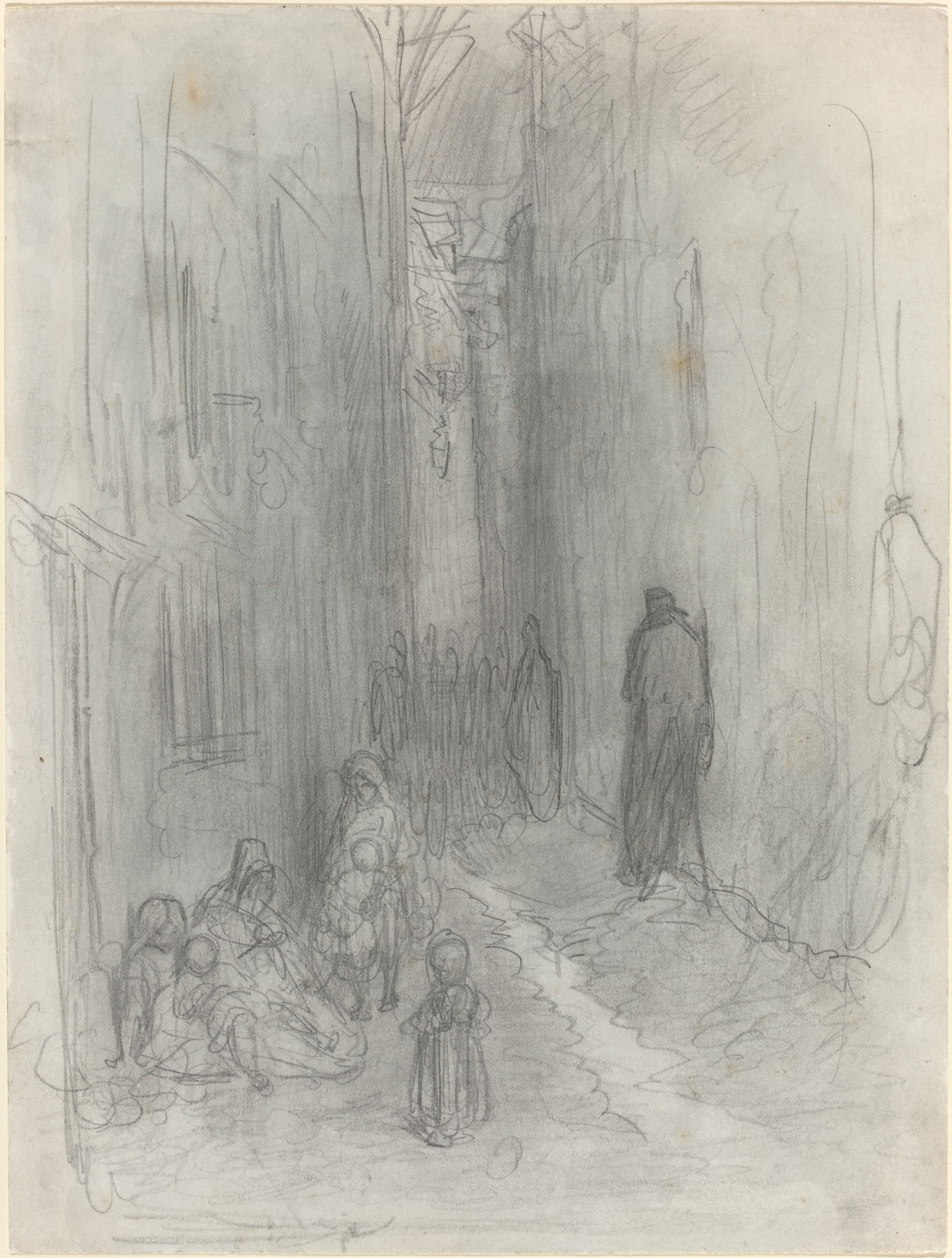
Drawing, A Backstreet in London (1868; National Gallery of Art, Washington)

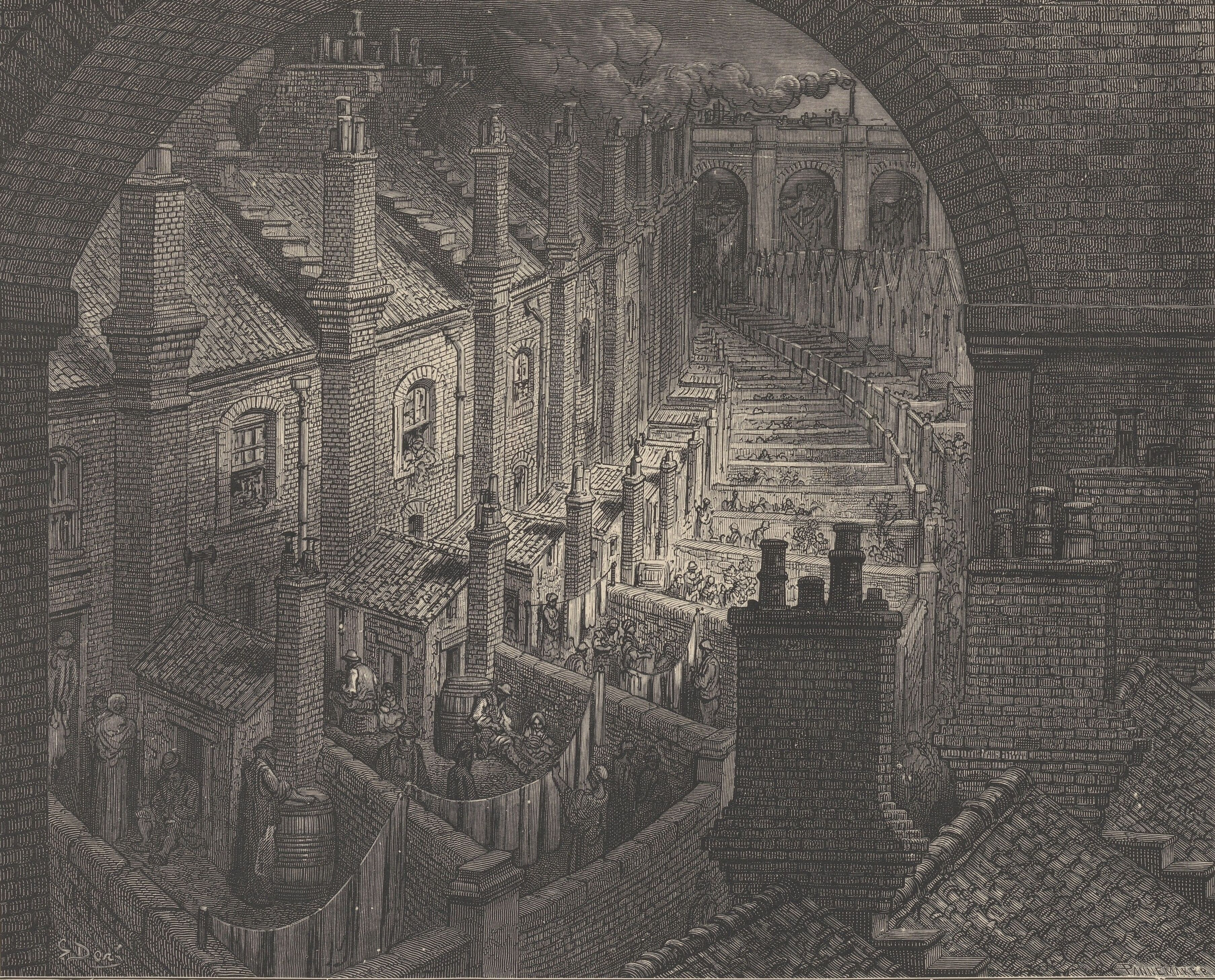
Over London by Rail, Gustave Doré c 1870. From London: A Pilgrimage

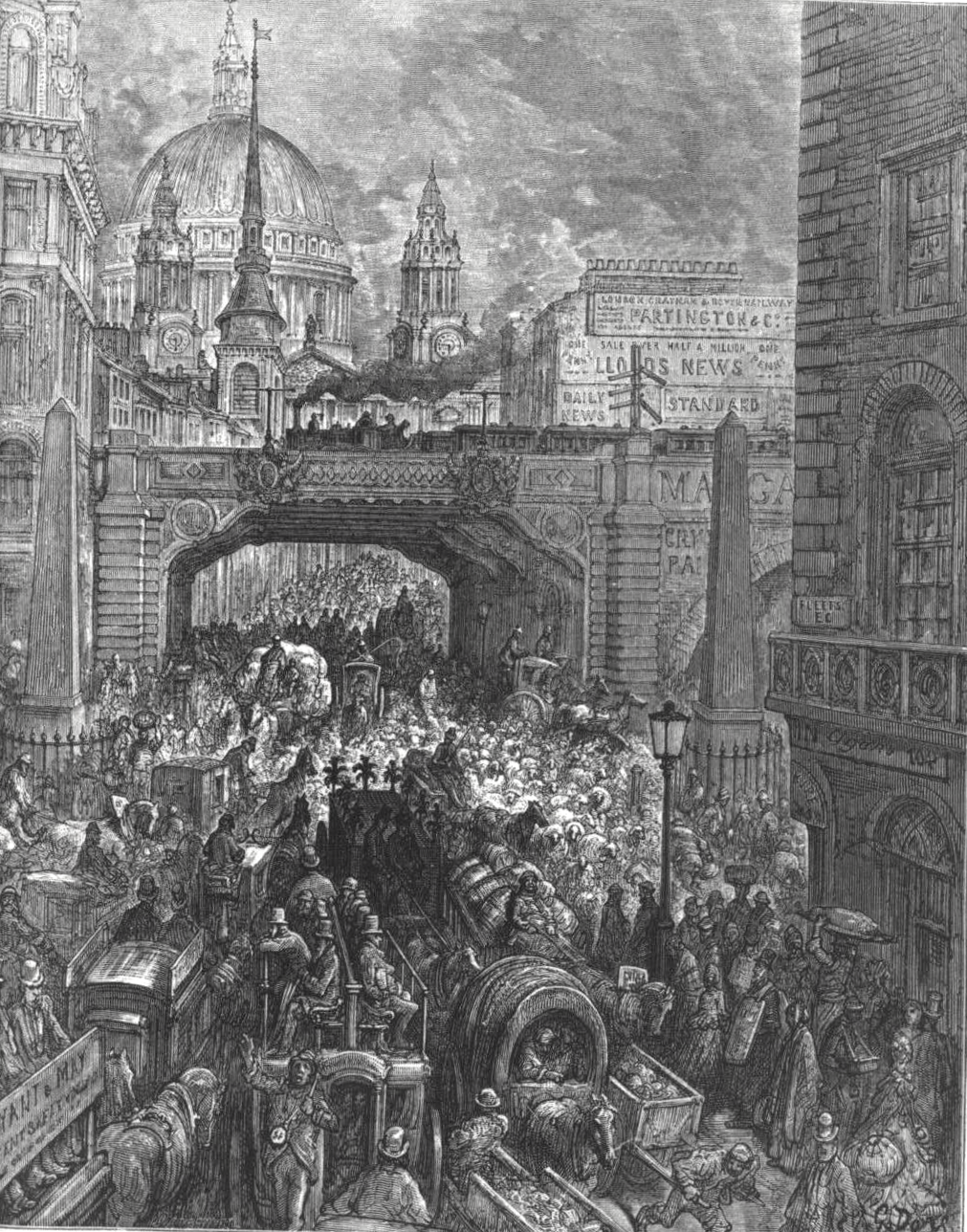
Ludgate Hill - A block in the Street, 1872. From London: A Pilgrimage

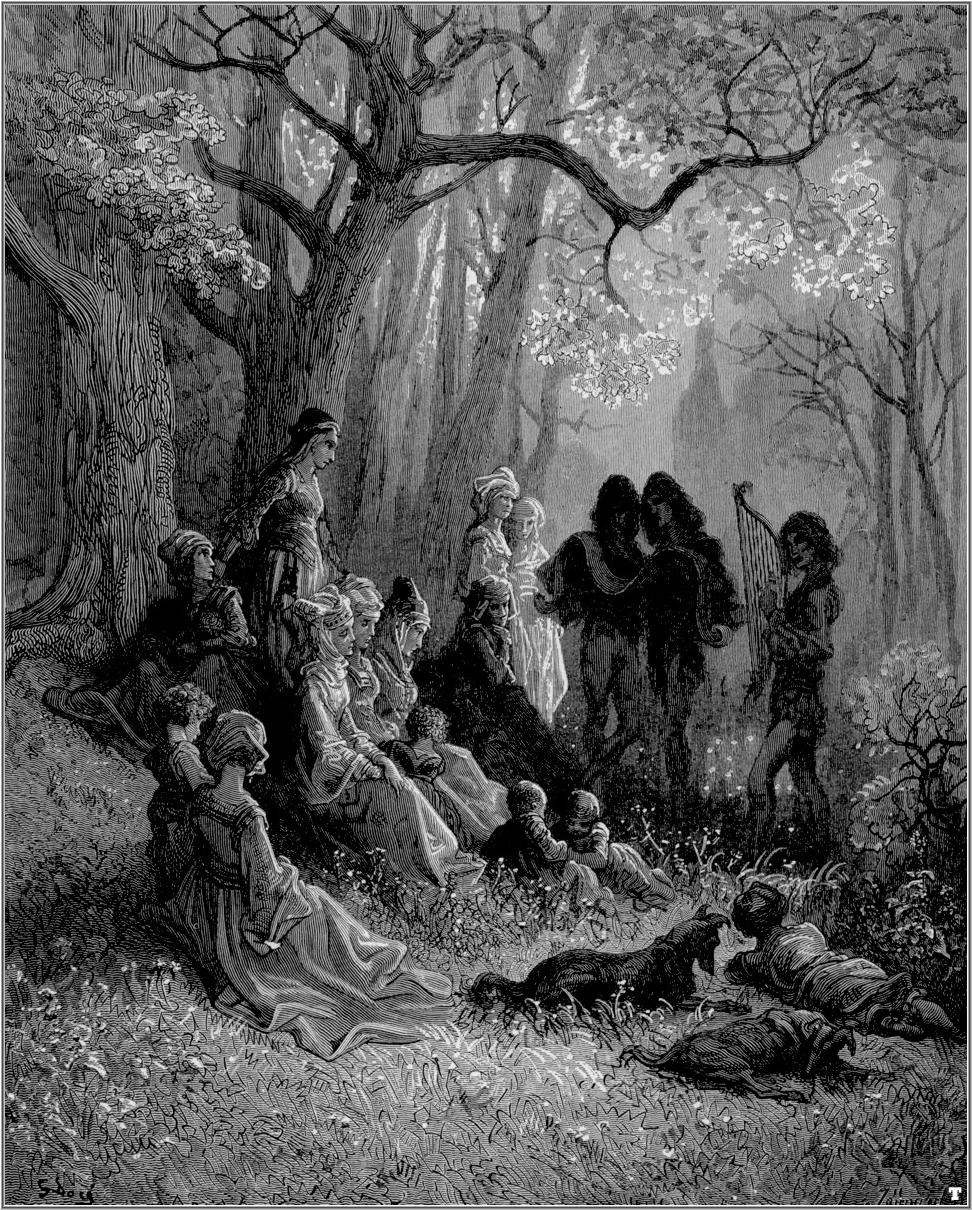
Crusades troubadours singing the glories of the crusades

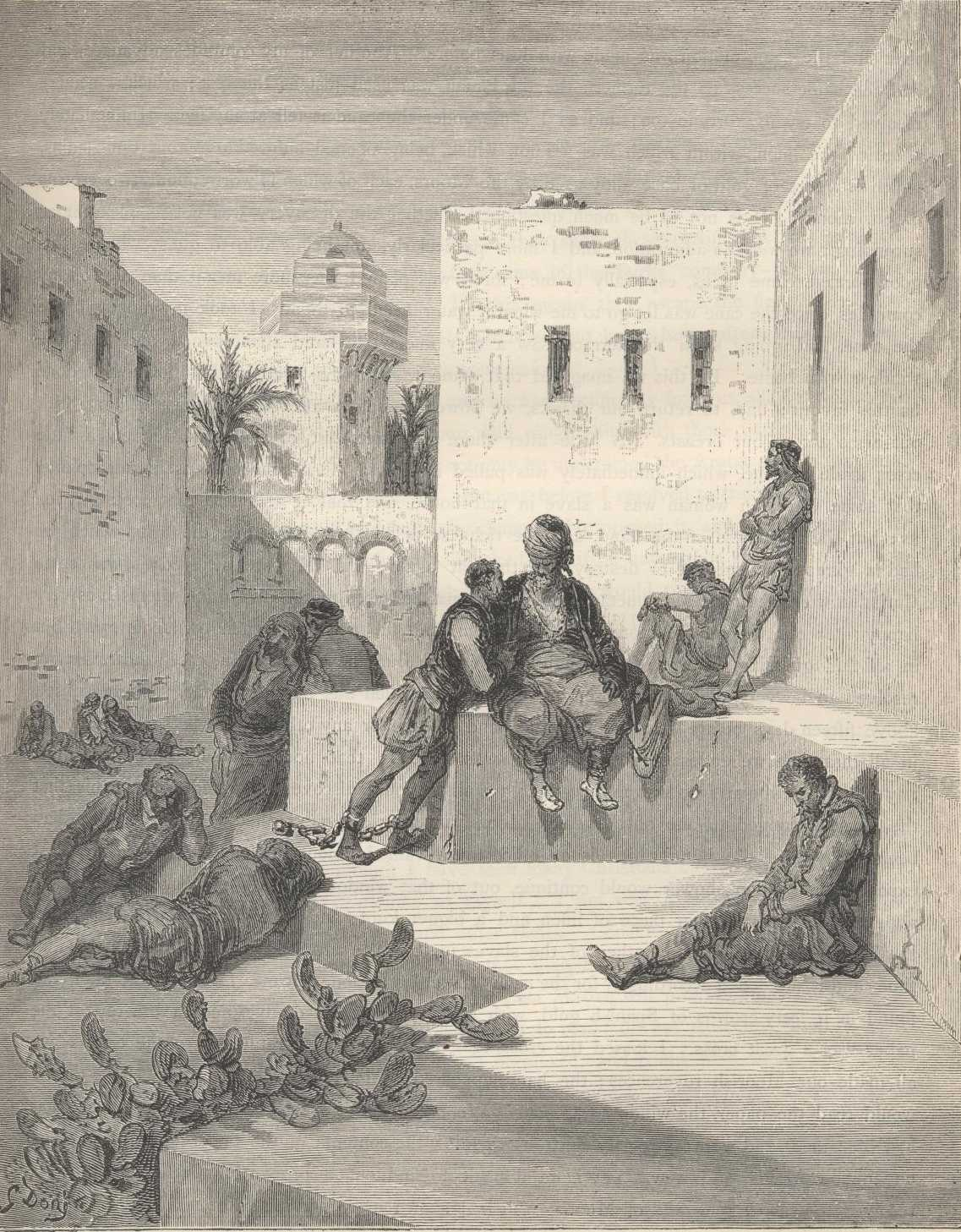
Don Quixote, illustrated by Gustave Doré

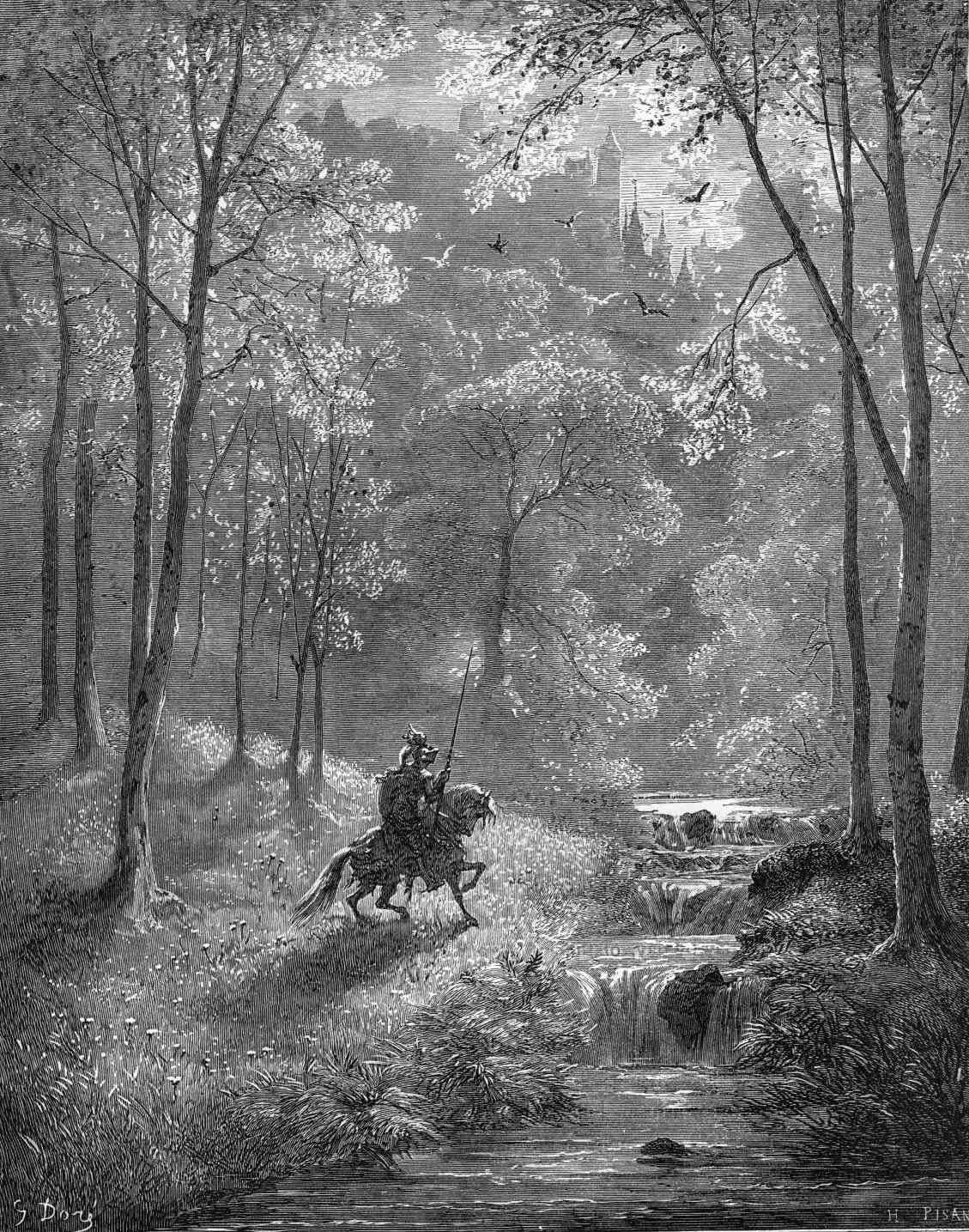
Don Quixote, illustrated by Gustave Doré, another one of the 500 pieces Doré created for the work

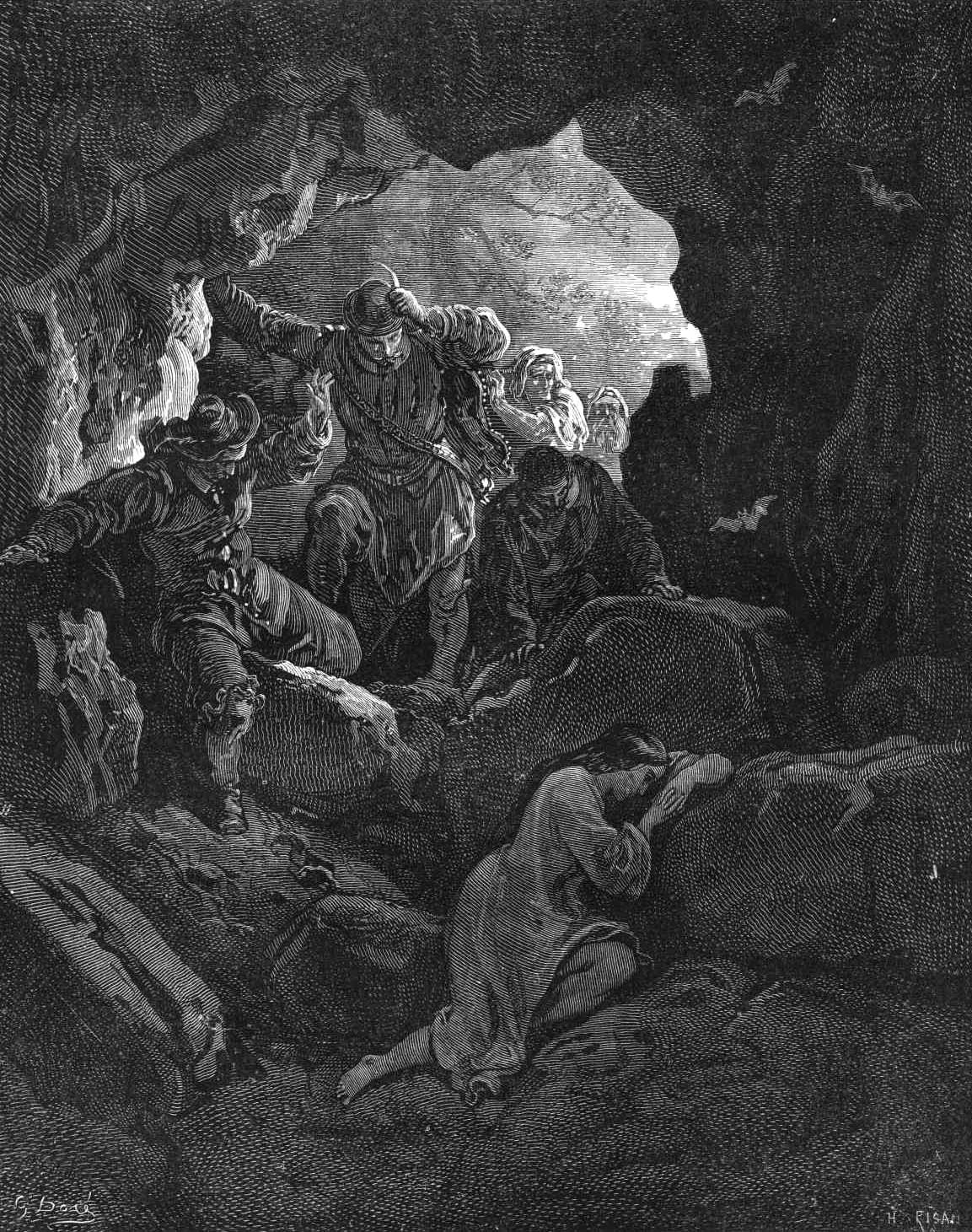
Miguel de Cervantes's Don Quixote, illustrated by Gustave Doré

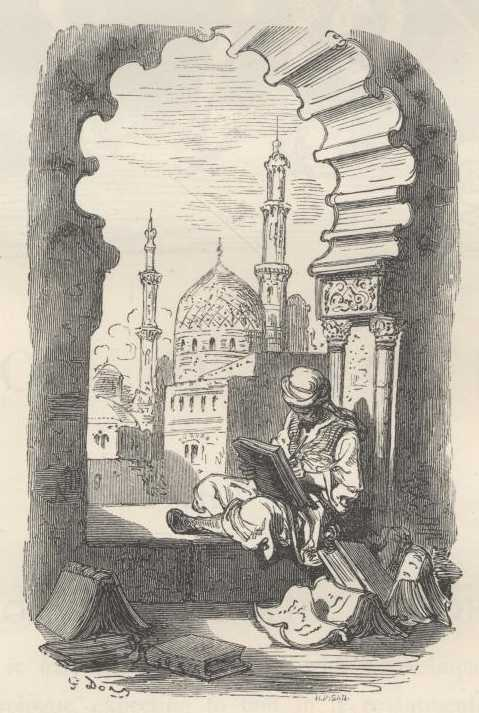
Another example of Don Quixote (Don Quijote in Spanish), illustrated by Gustave Doré

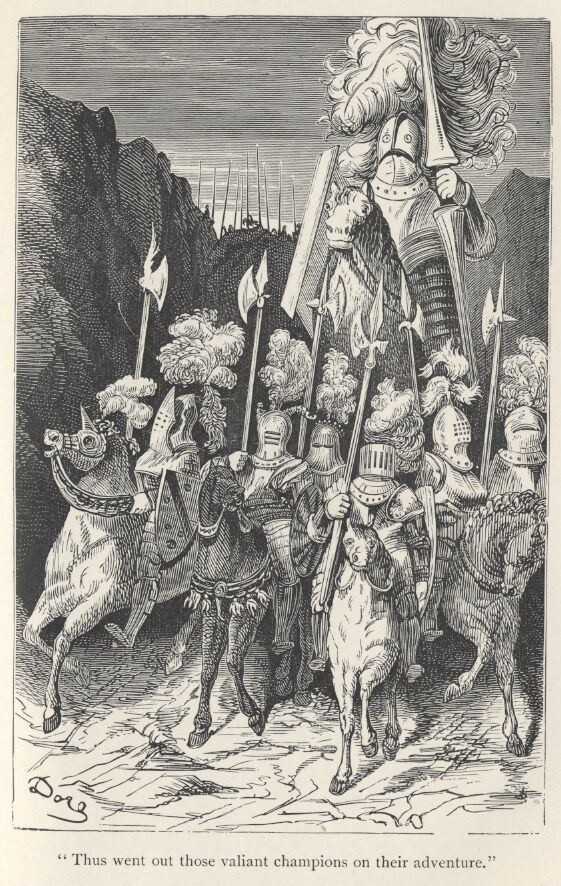
Rabelais's Gargantua (English translation)

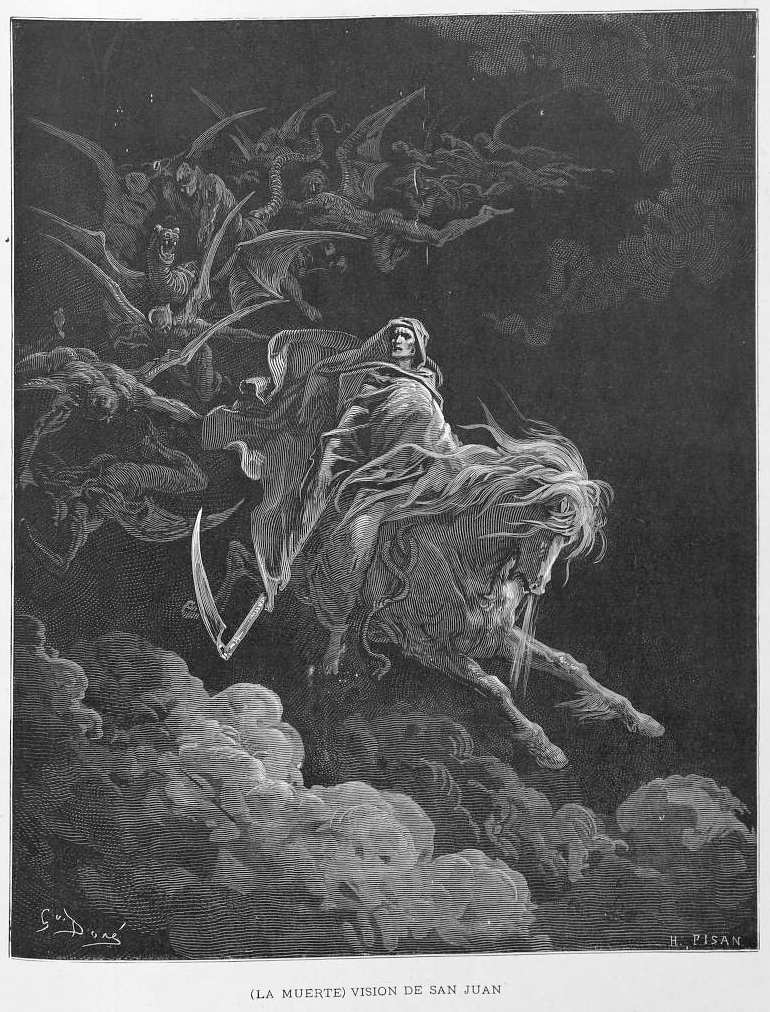
St. John's vision - Sagrada Biblia T4

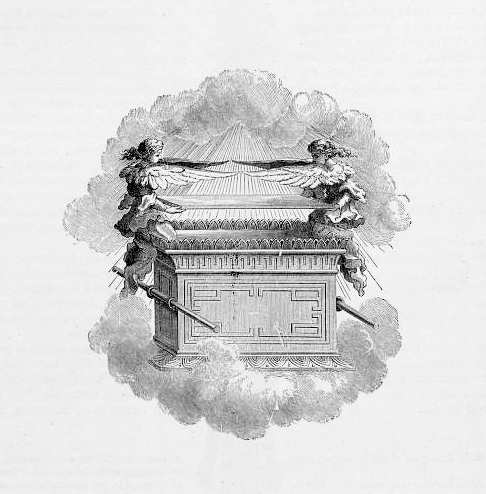
Ark of the Covenant - La Sagrada Biblia T4

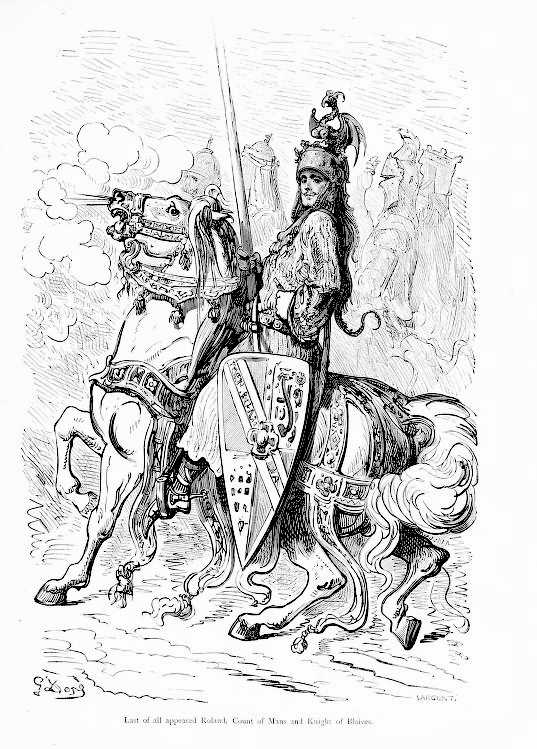
Roland, count of Mans, knight of Blaives - Days of Chivalry (Croquemitaine)

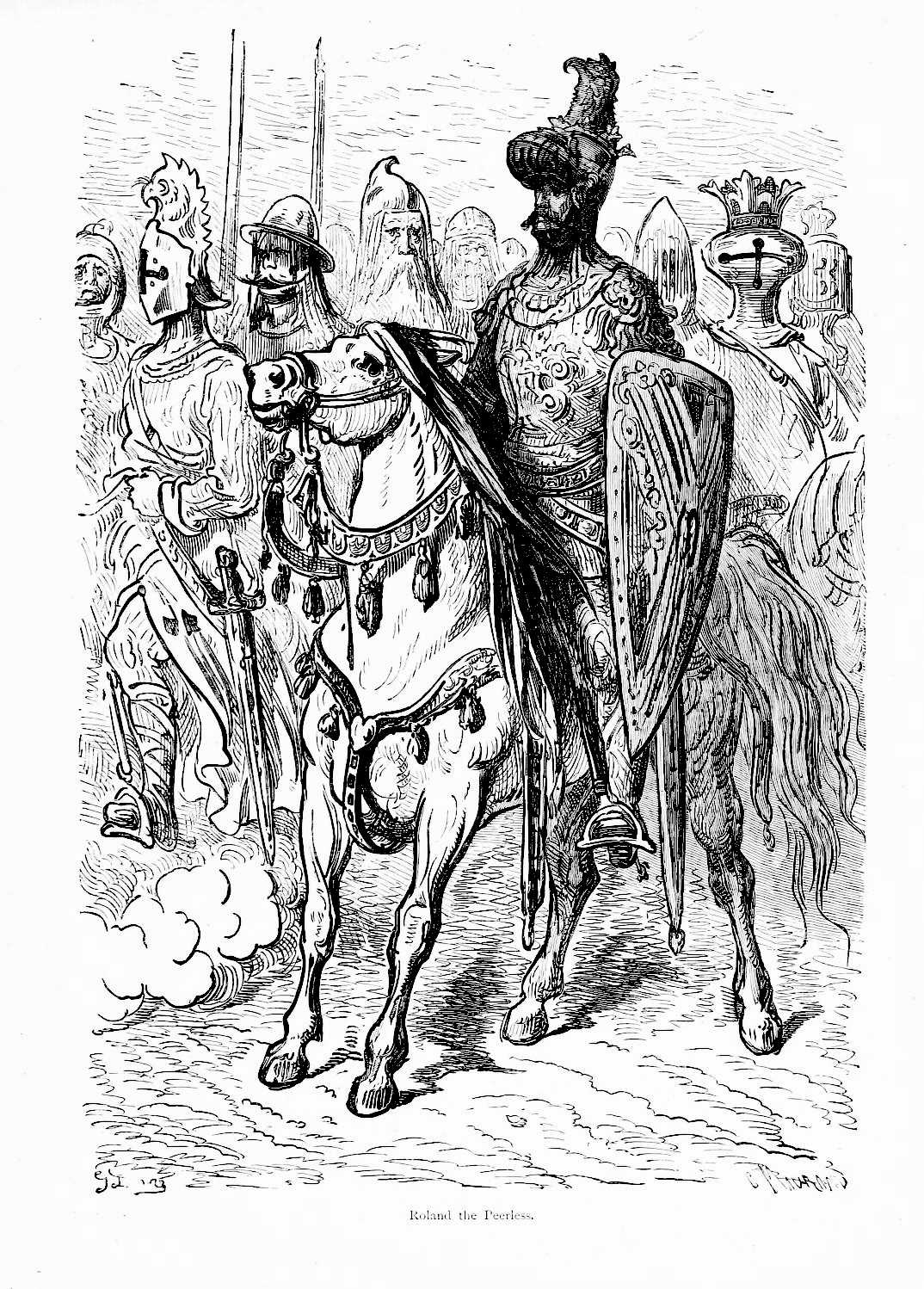
Roland the Peerless - Days of Chivalry (Croquemitaine)

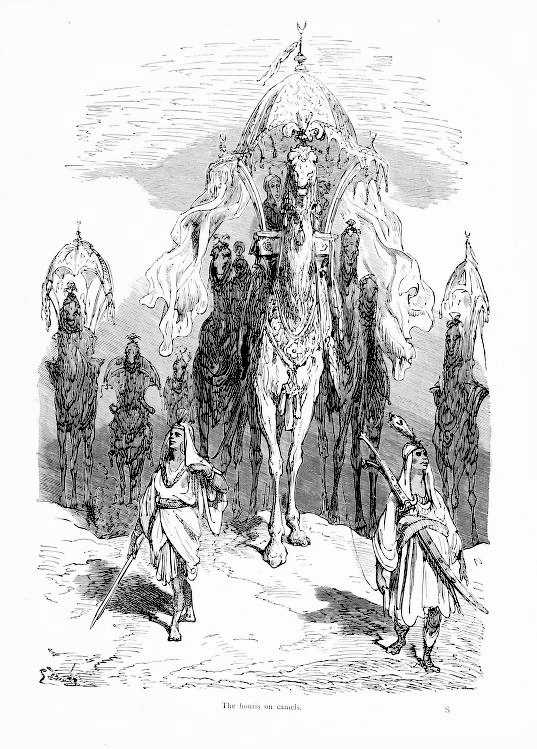
The Houris on Camels - Days of Chivalry (Croquemitaine)
Sculptures

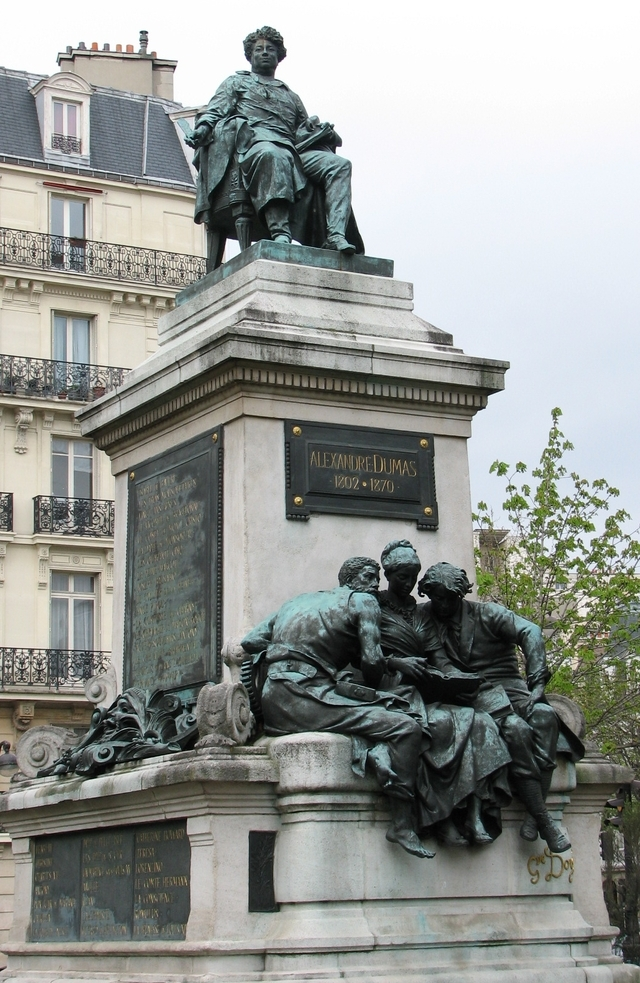
The Dumas Monument in Paris

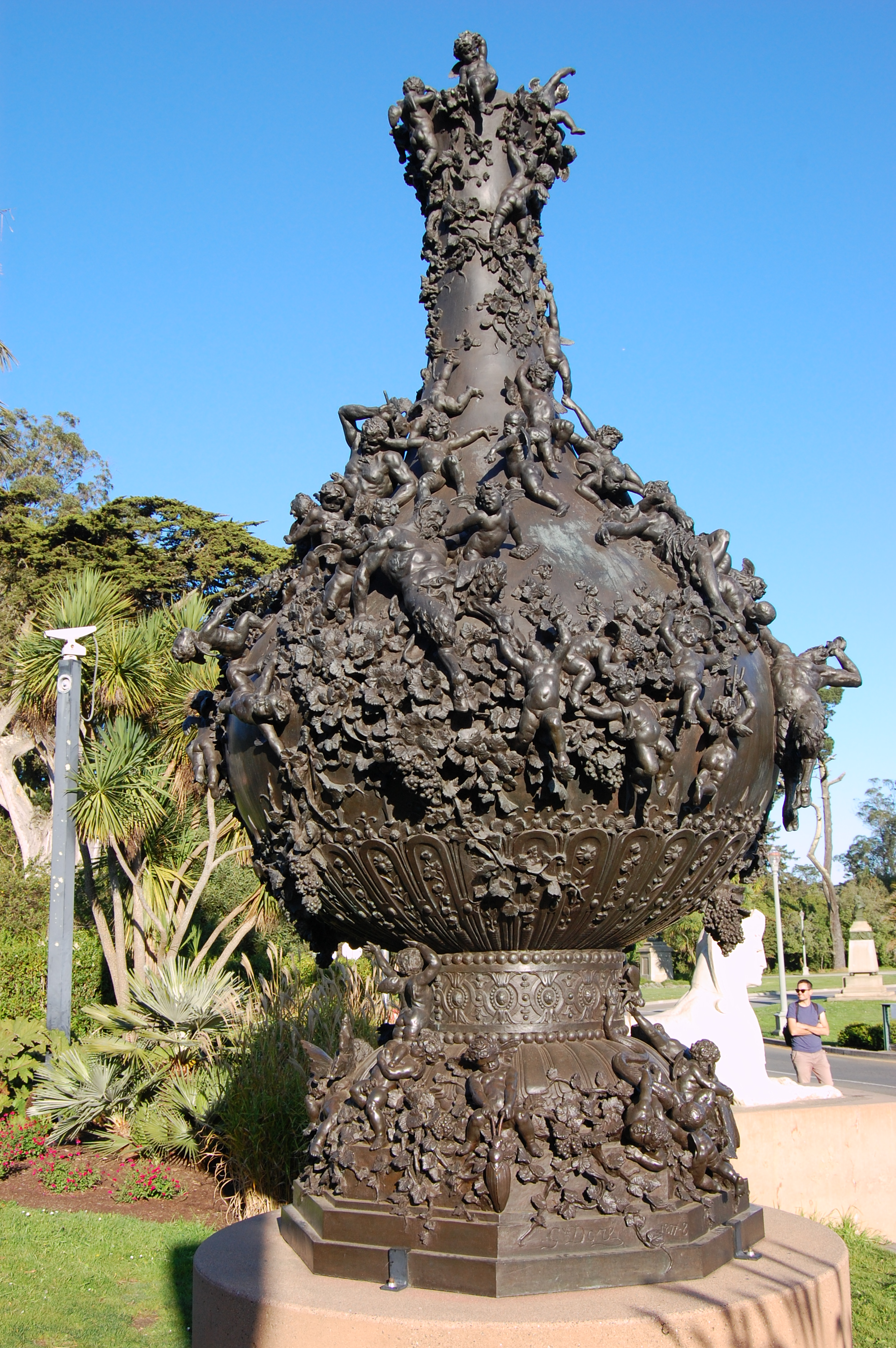
Le Poème de la Vigne or The Vintage Vase, version in San Francisco

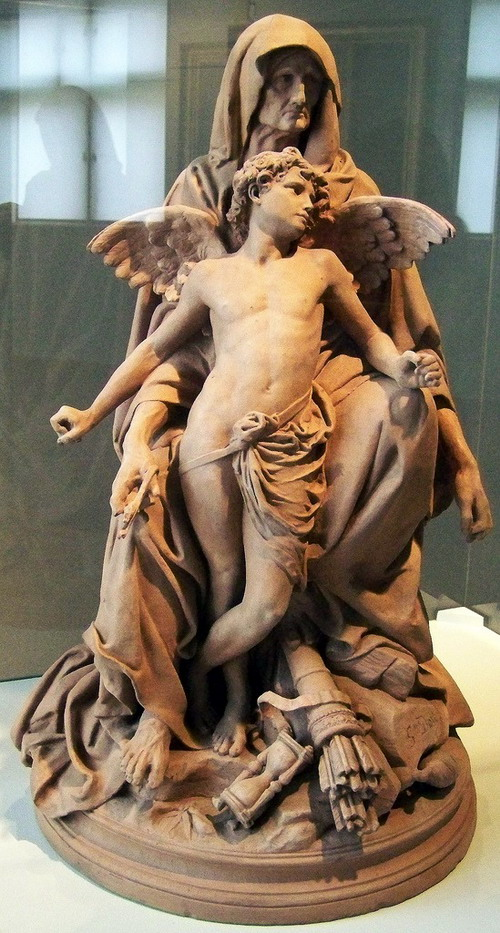
Cupid and Time, modello in terracotta

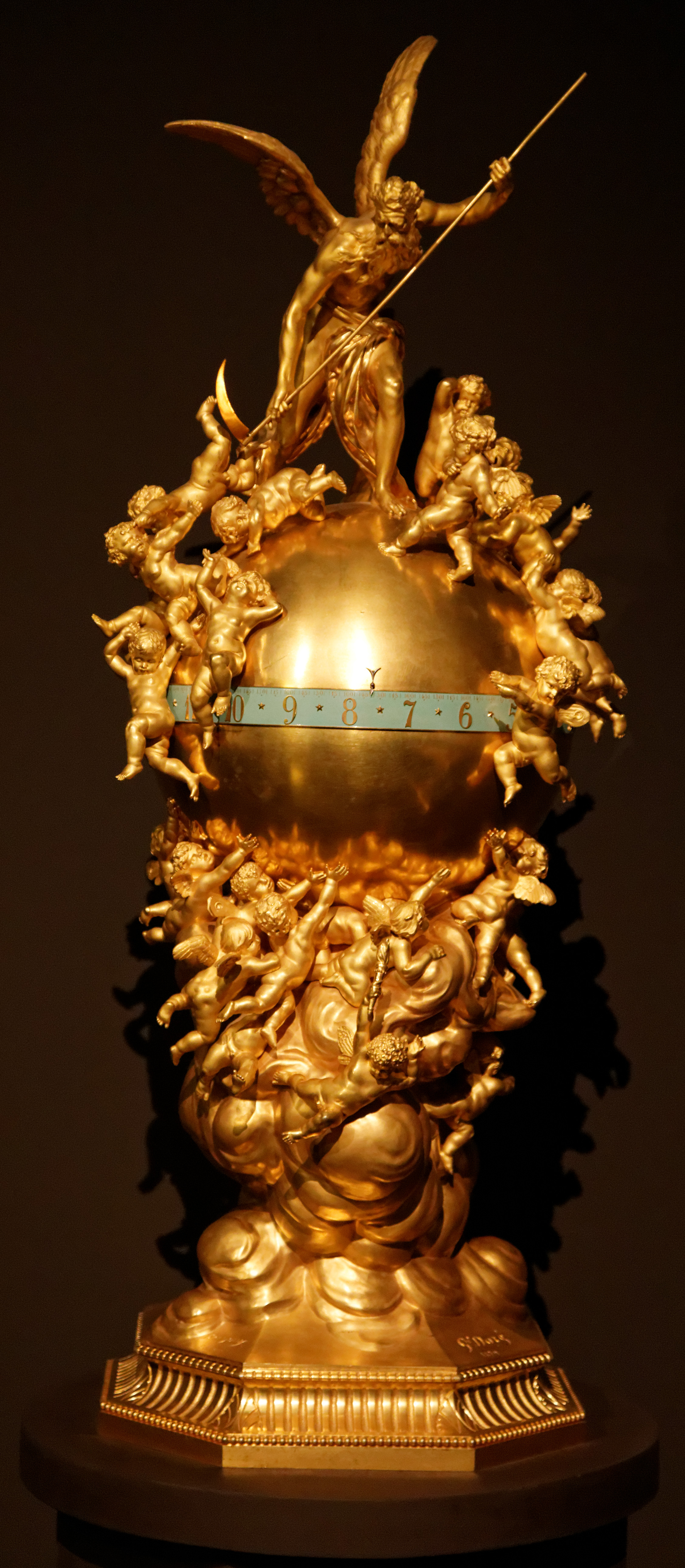
A clock with Time defeating Loves, cast 1879

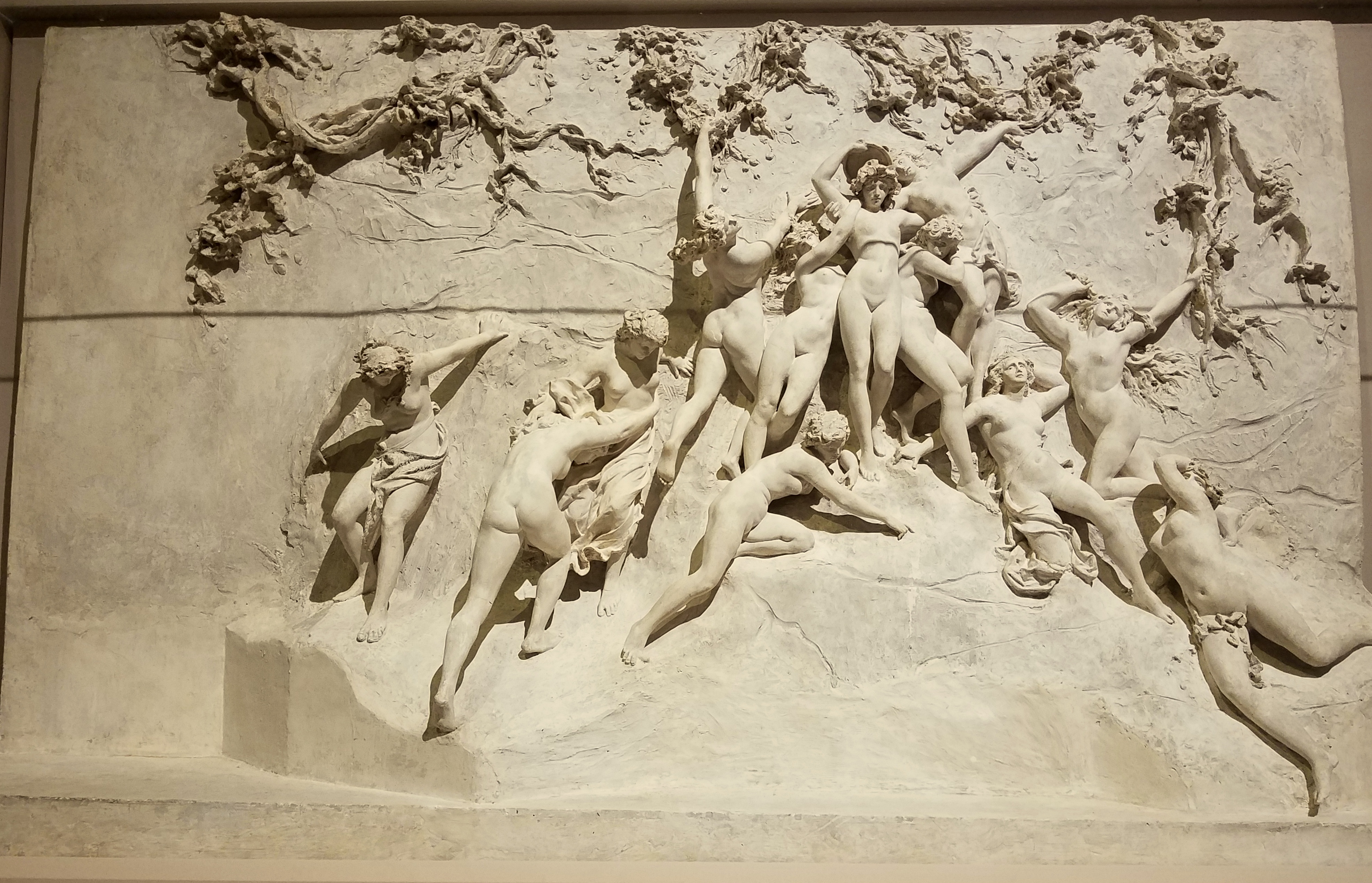
Maenads in a Wood, 1879, plaster modello, Museum of Fine Arts, Boston
Paintings

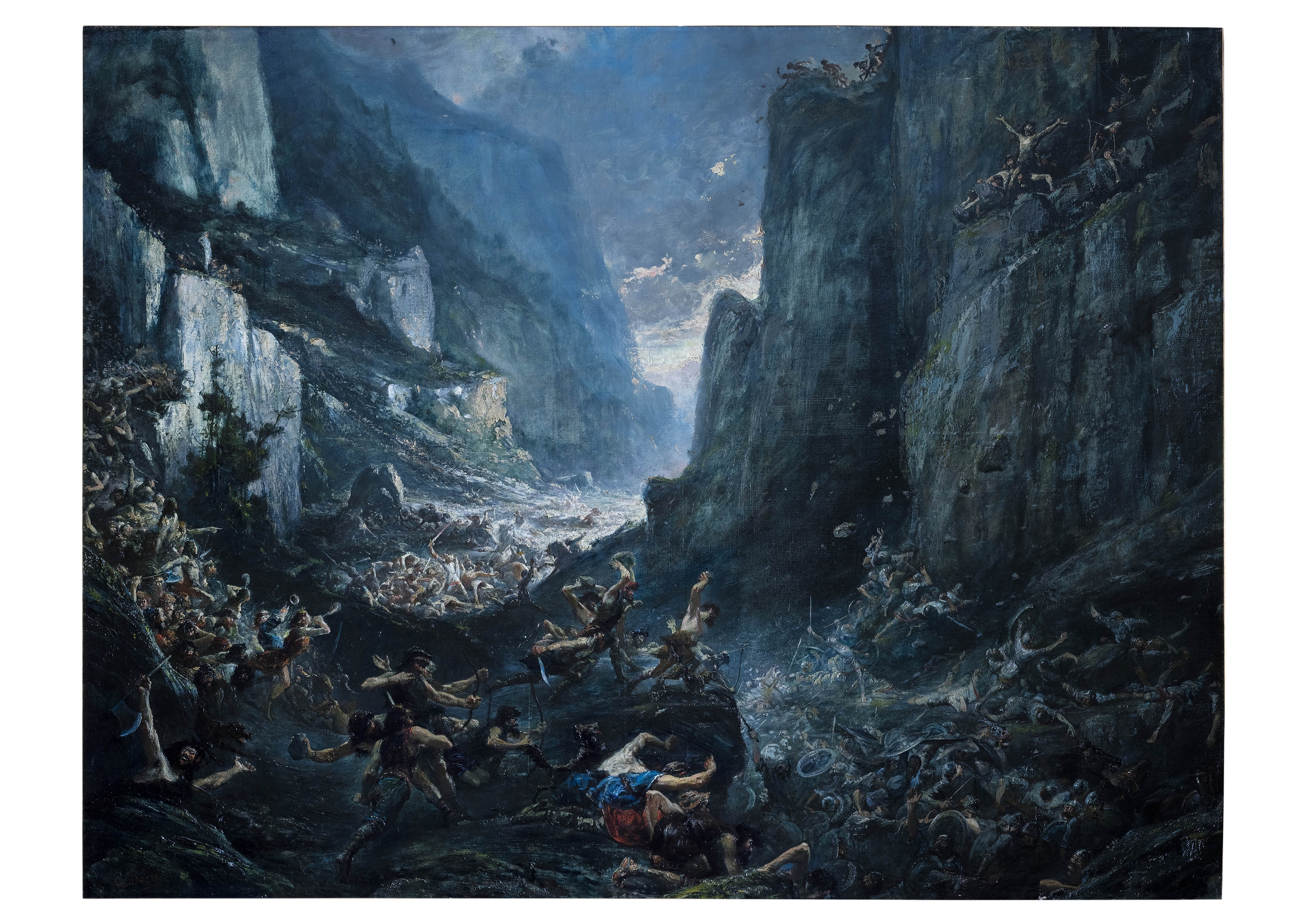
Roland à Roncevaux, private collection, Paris

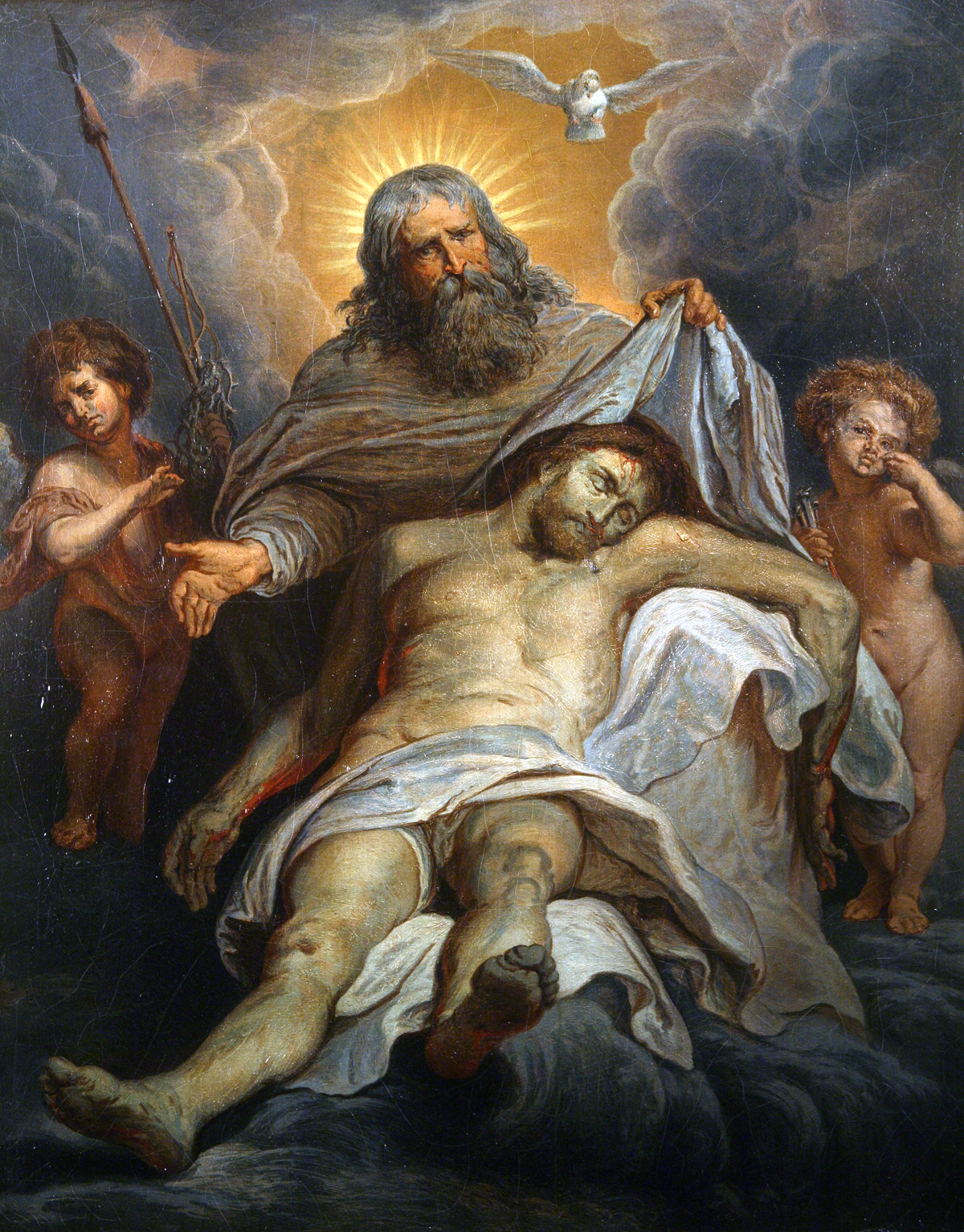
La Sainte Trinité, Glynn Vivian Art Gallery

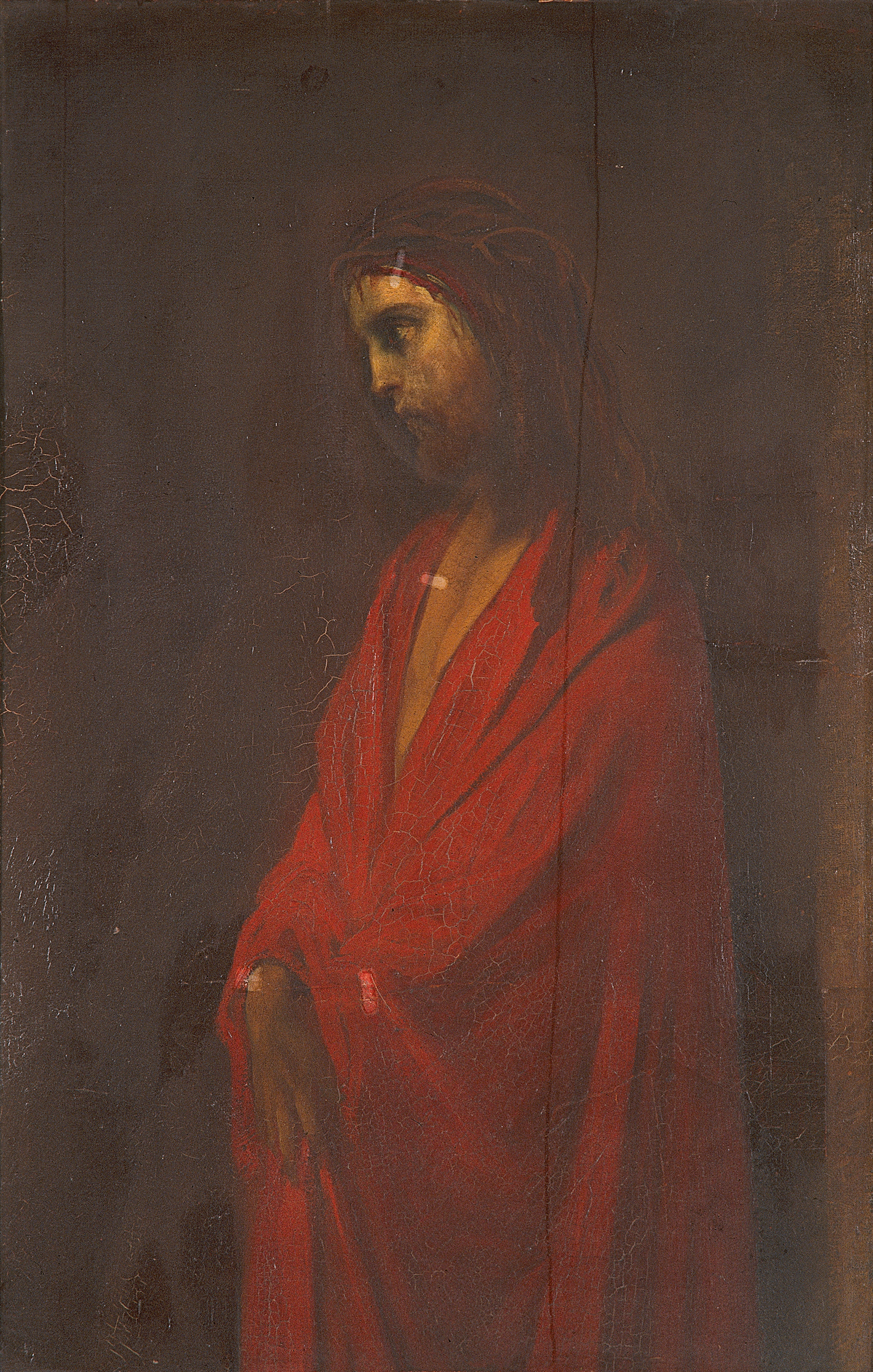
Ecce Homo, Glynn Vivian Art Gallery

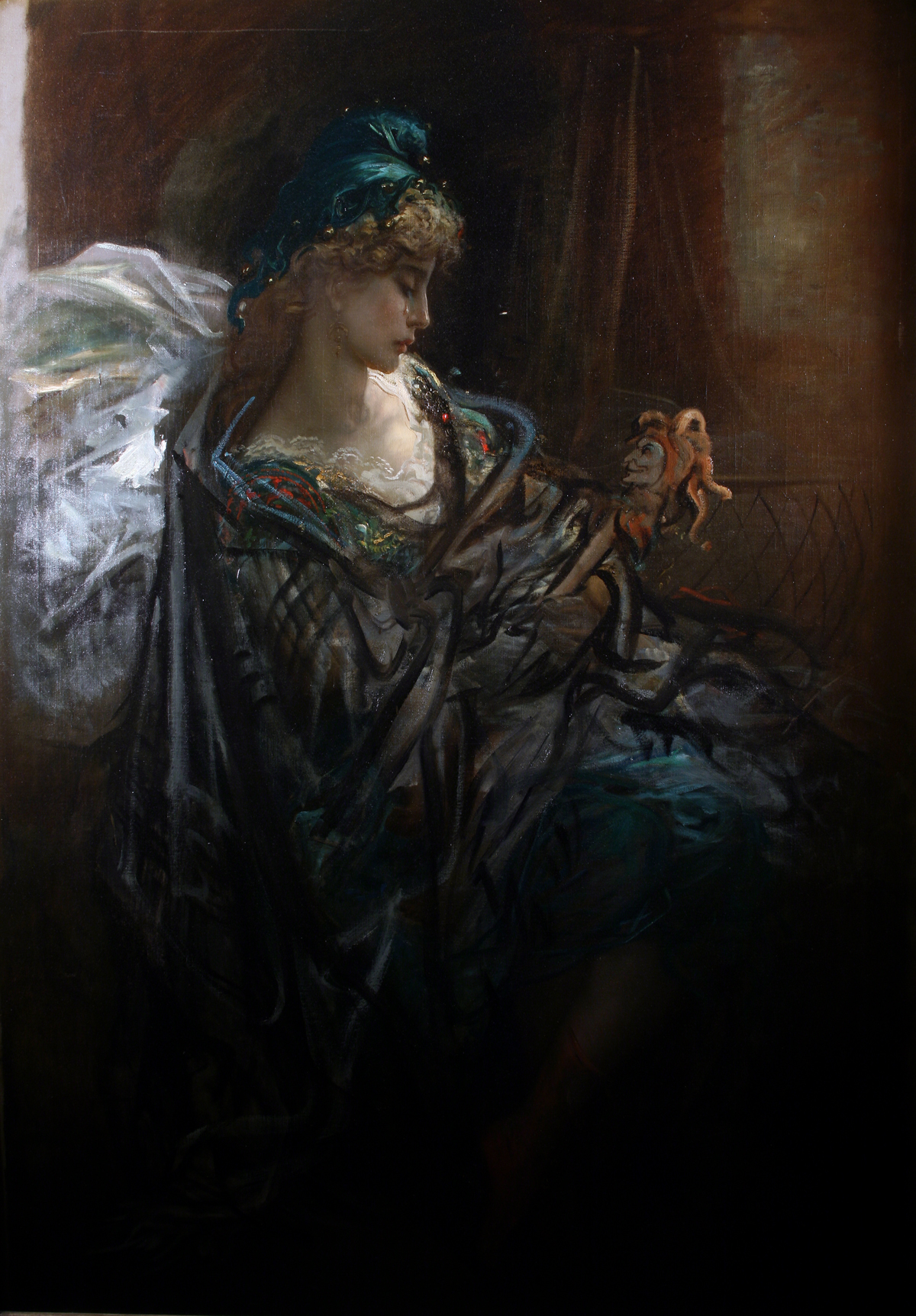
La folie, Glynn Vivian Art Gallery

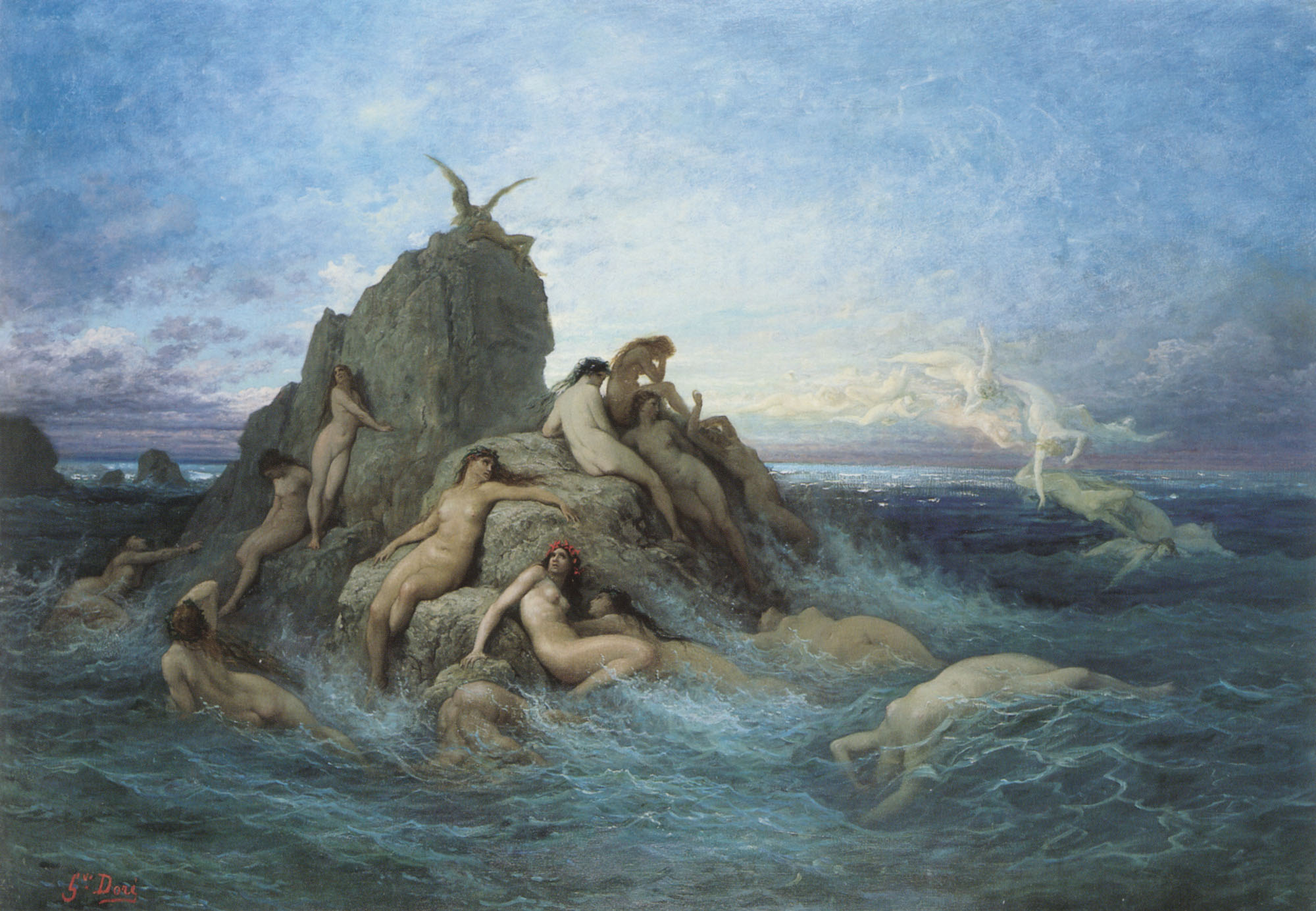
The Oceanids (The Naiads of the Sea), 1860s

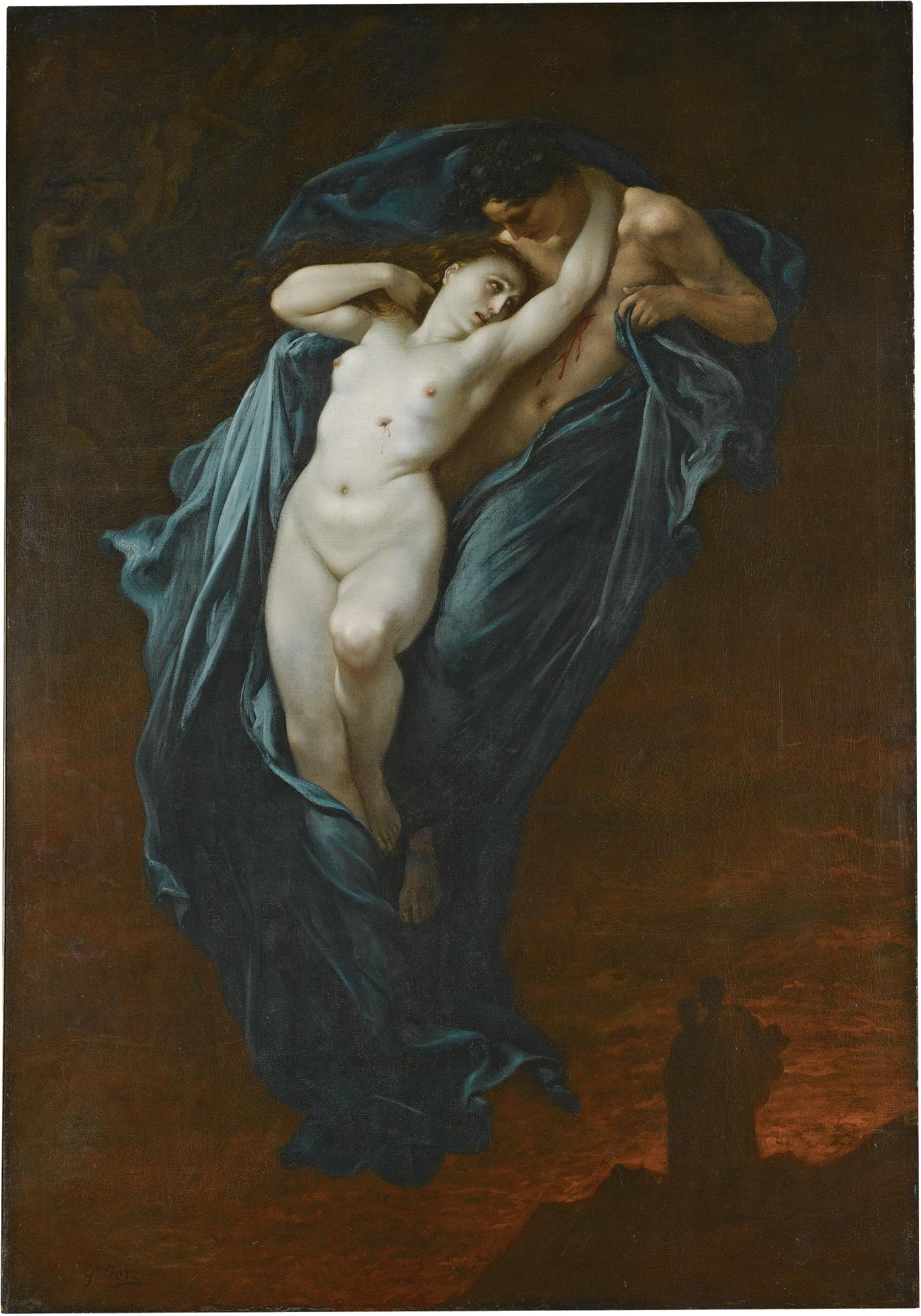
Paolo and Francesca da Rimini, 1863

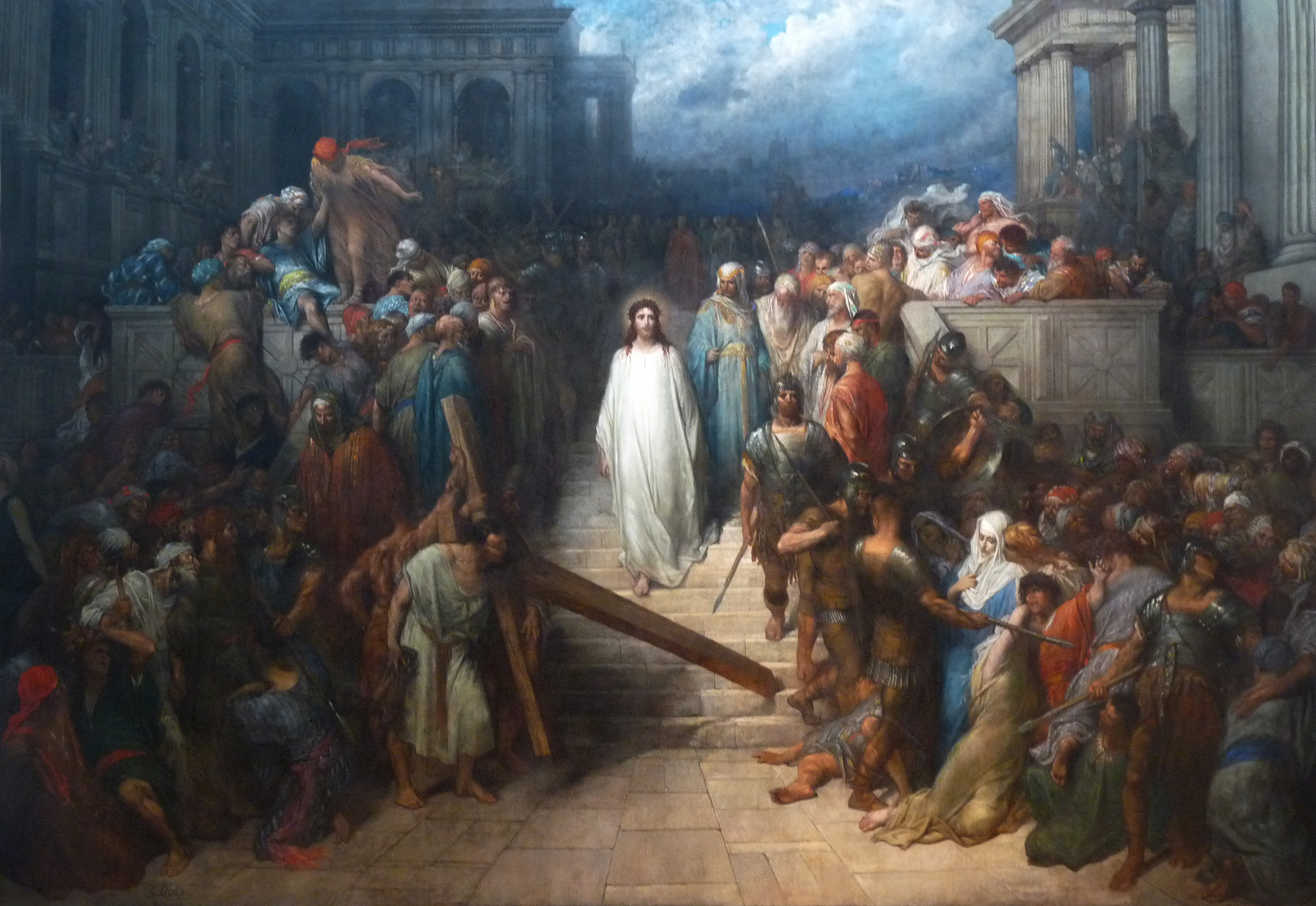
Christ Leaving the Praetorium 1867–1872, Strasbourg Museum of Modern and Contemporary Art

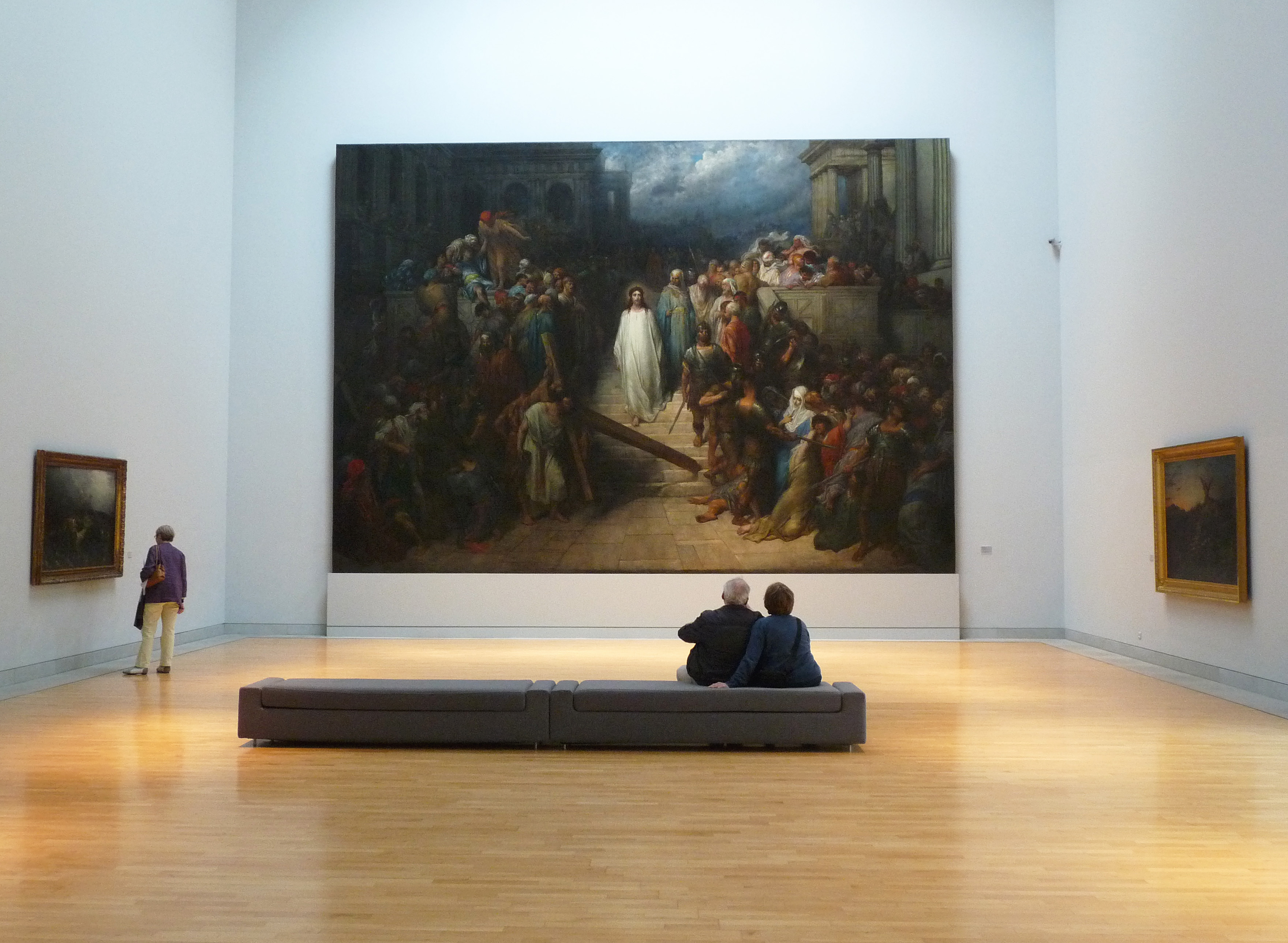
Christ Leaving the Praetorium in the room of the Strasbourg Museum of Modern and Contemporary Art where it hangs

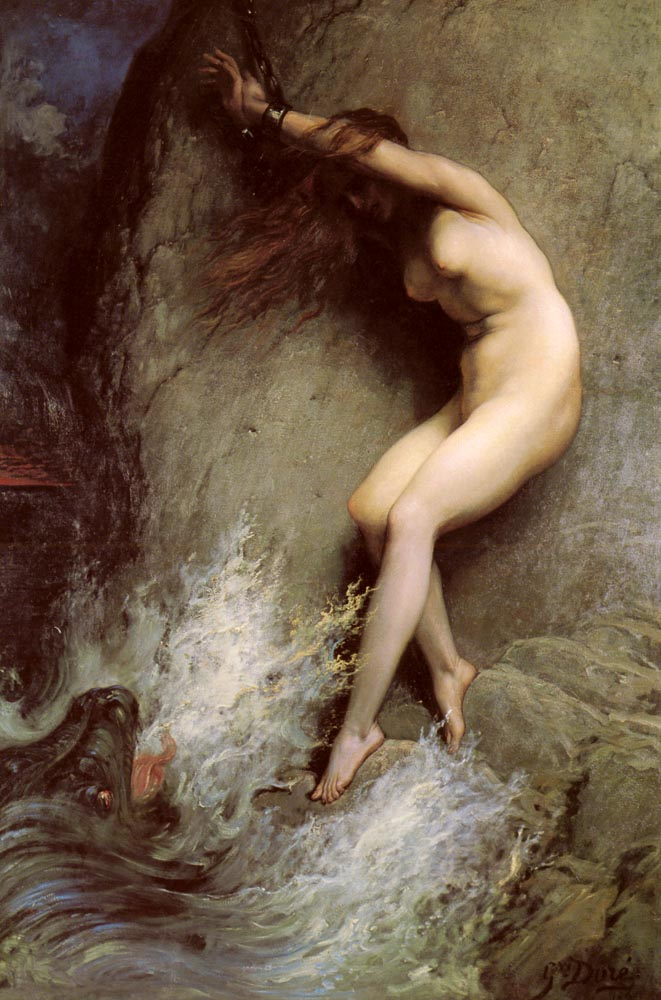
Andromède, 1869, Chimei Museum, Tainan, Taiwan

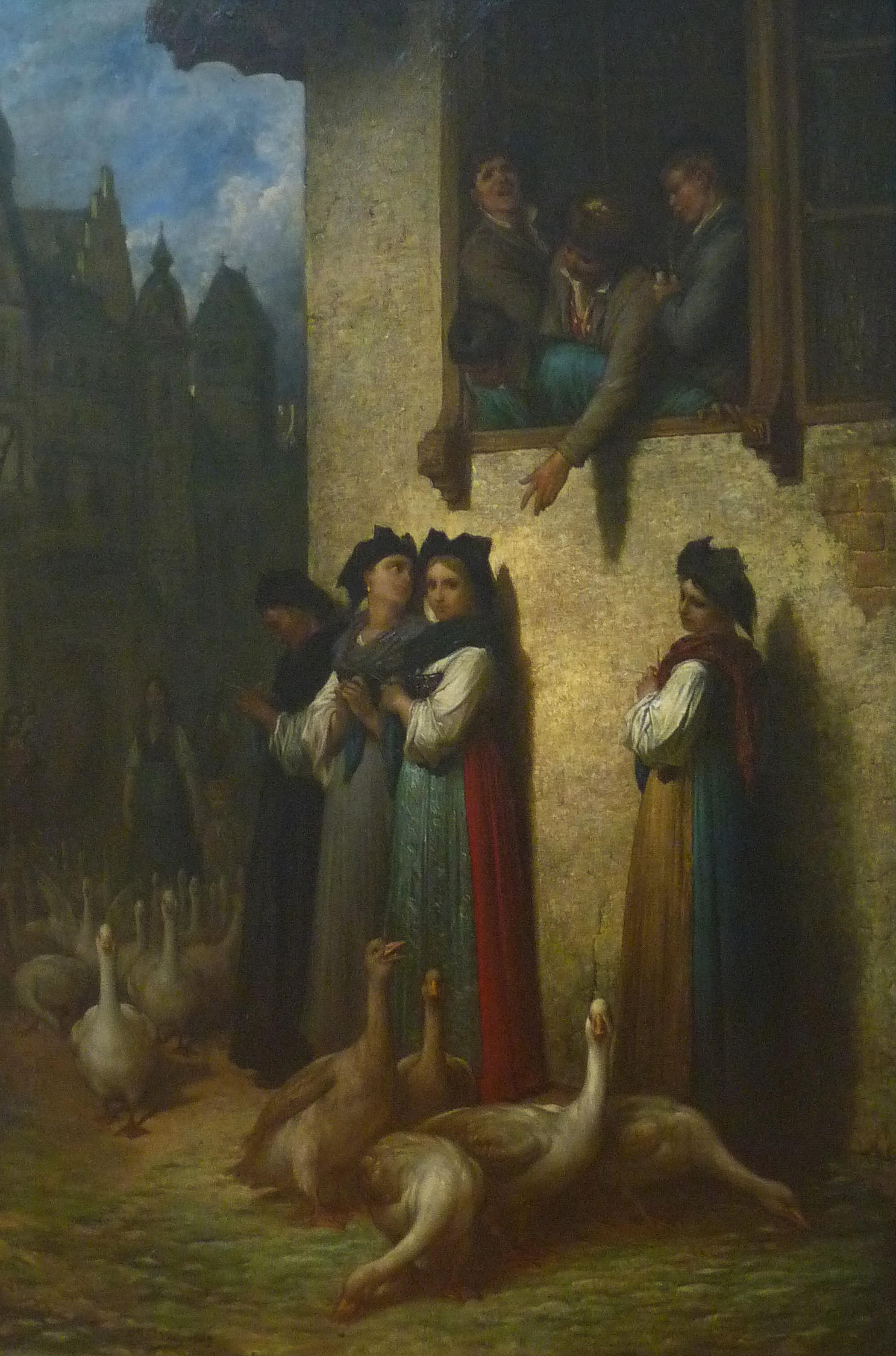
Soir en Alsace, 1869

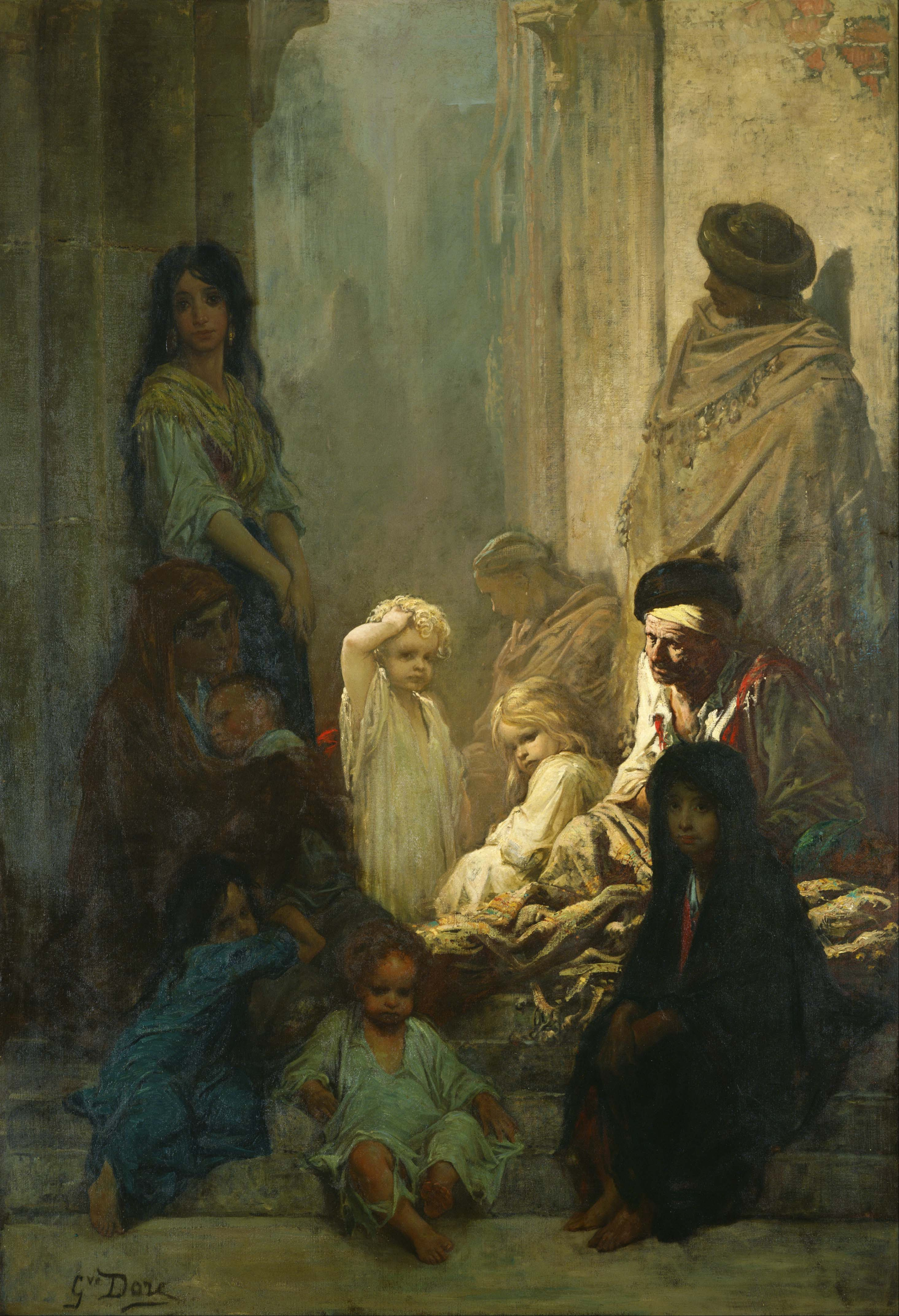
La Siesta, Memory of Spain, c. 1868

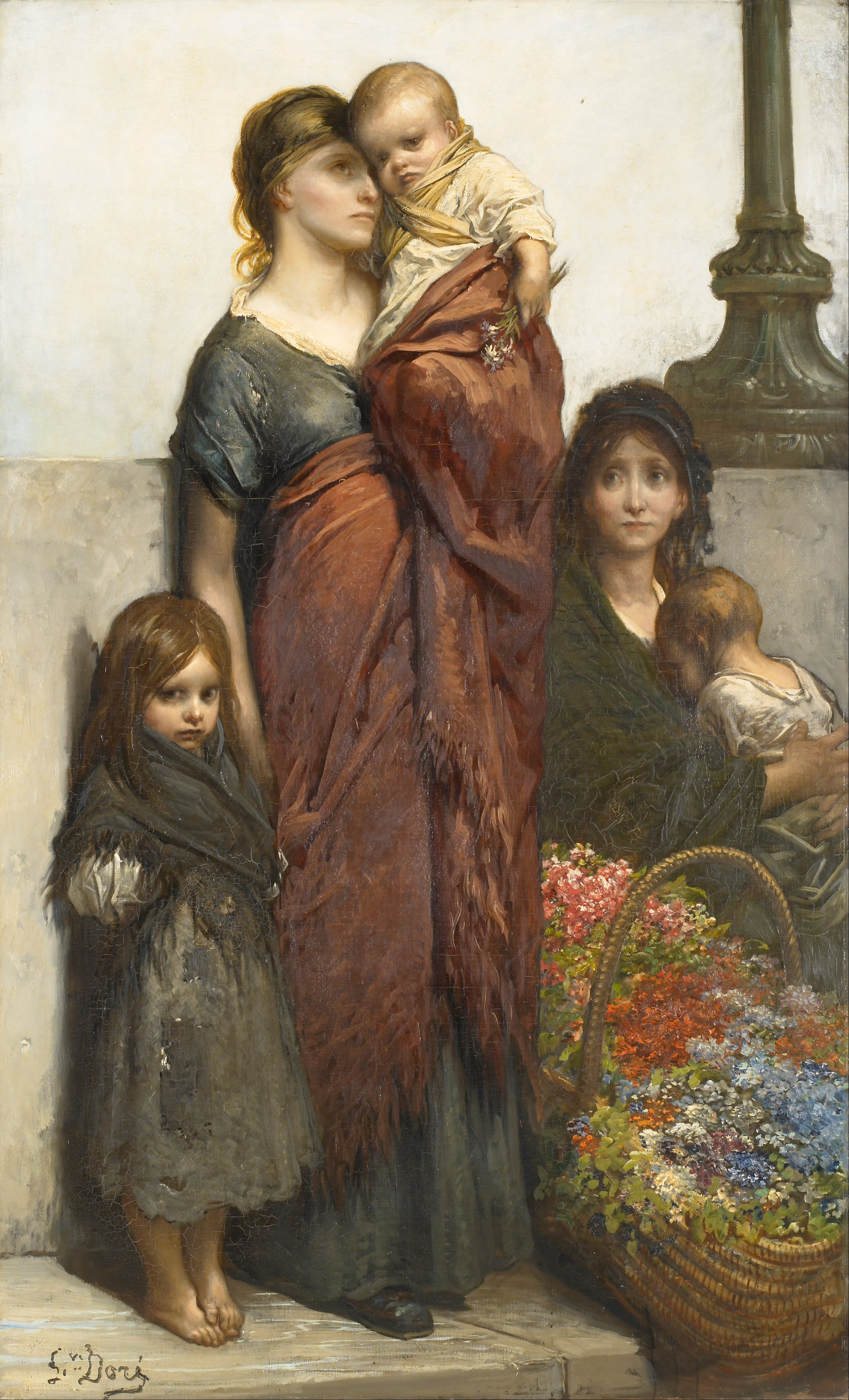
Flower Sellers of London, c. 1875

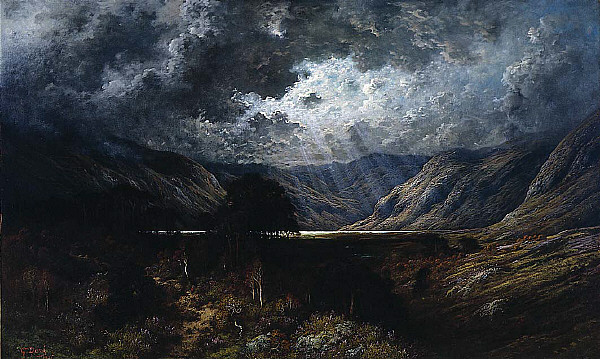
Loch Lomond, 1875

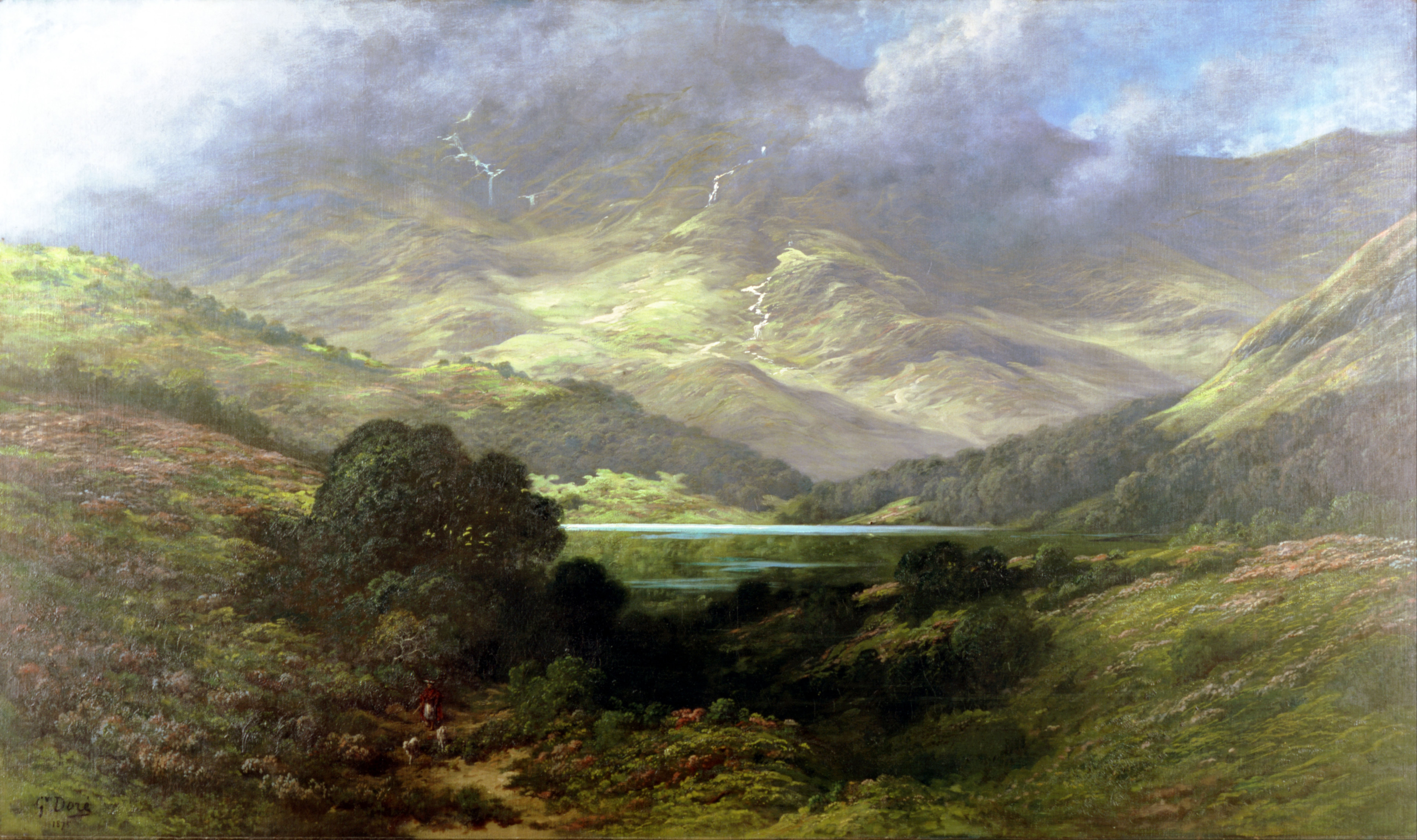
Landscape in Scotland, ca. 1875, Toledo Museum of Art

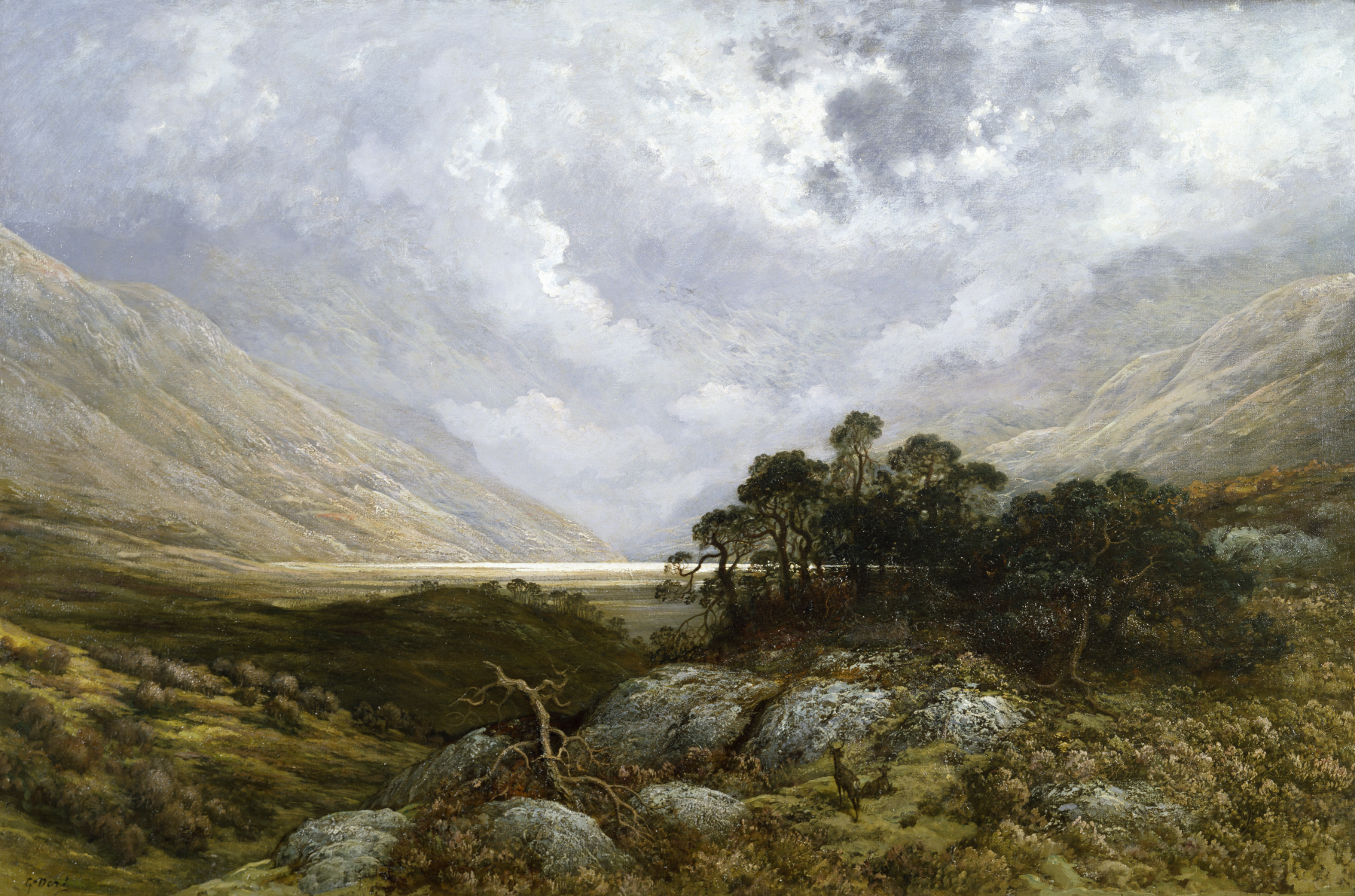
Landscape in Scotland, ca. 1878, Walters Art Museum

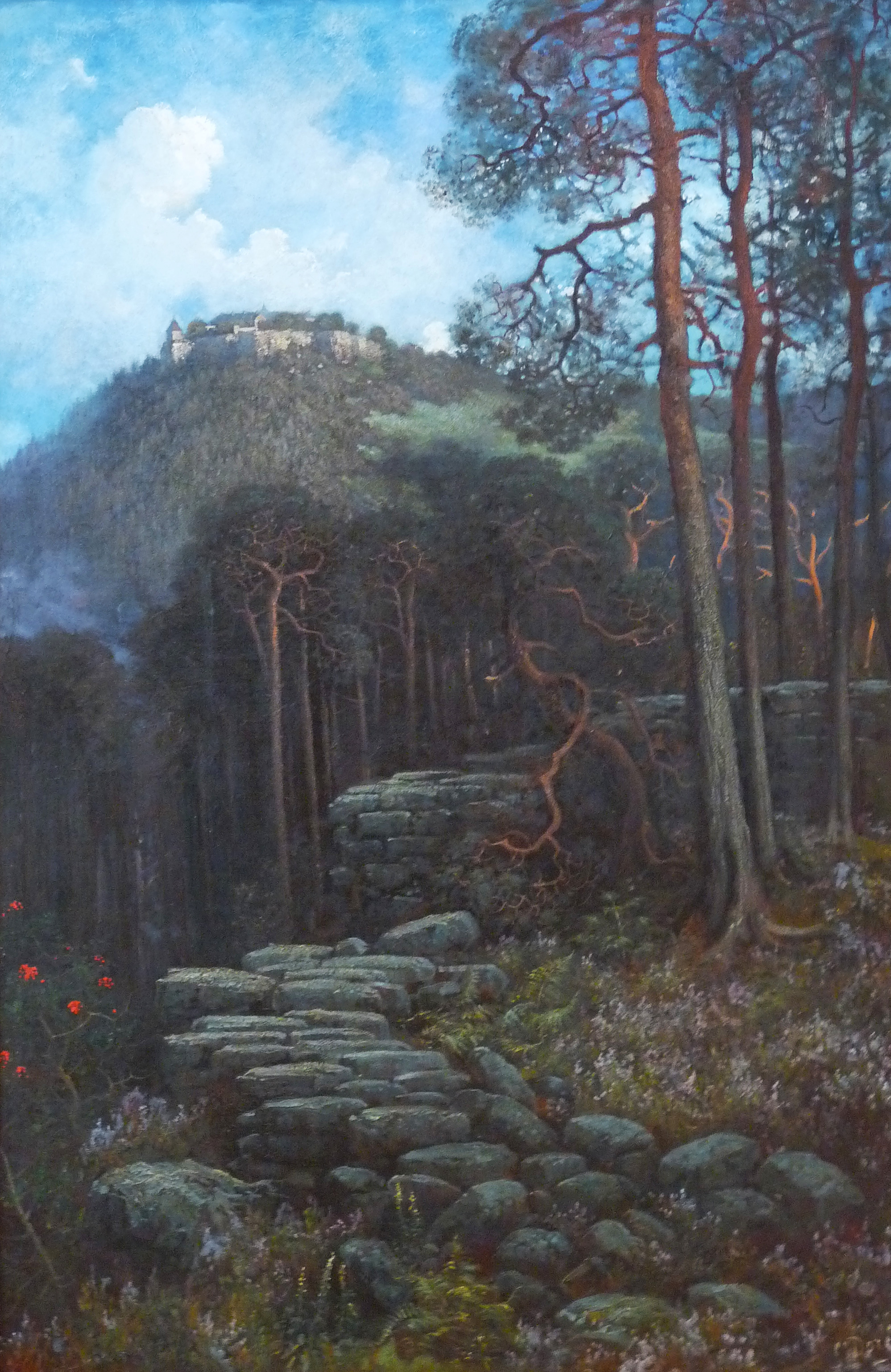
Mont Sainte-Odile avec mur païen, by 1883

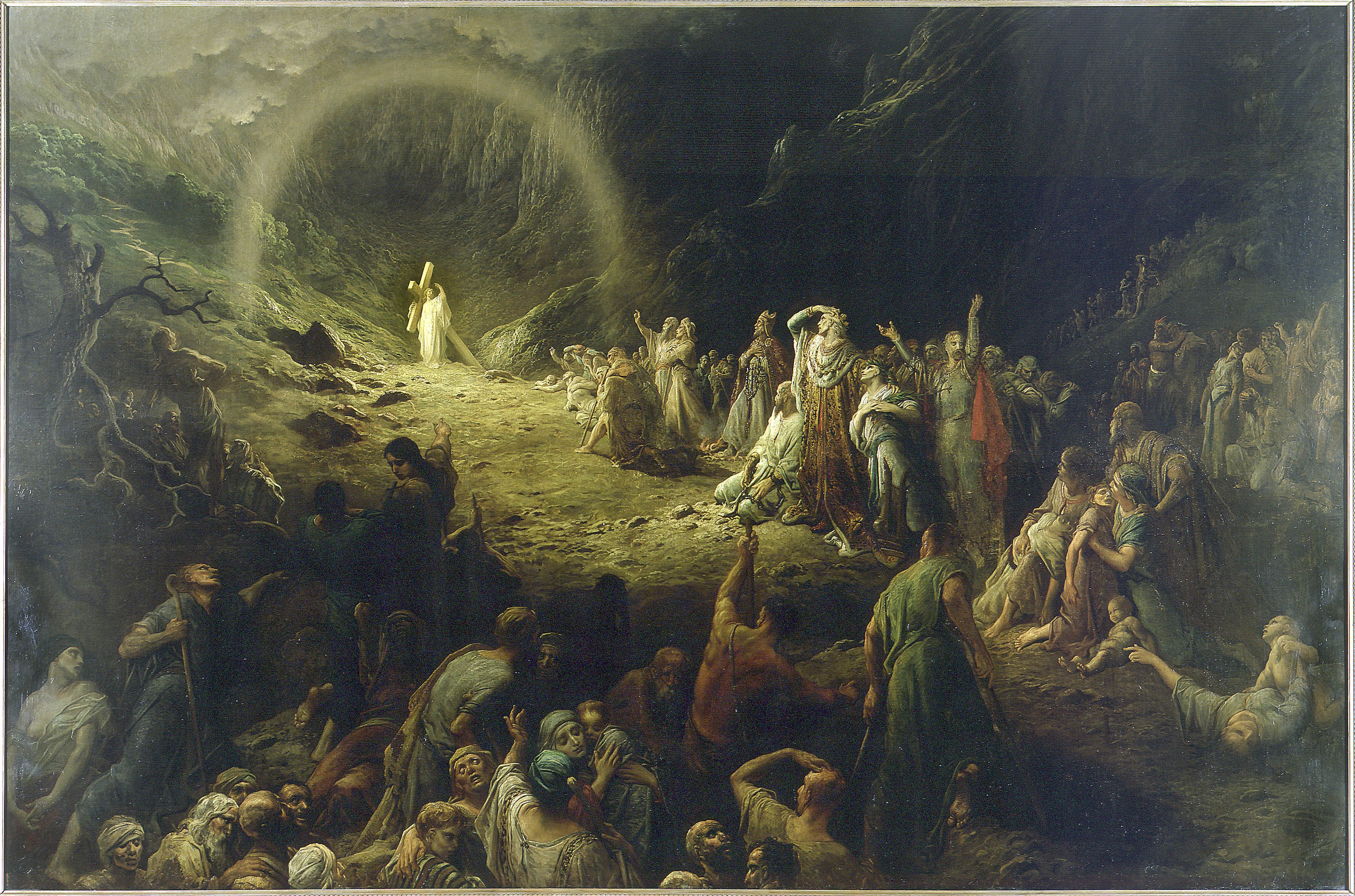
The Valley of Tears, 1883

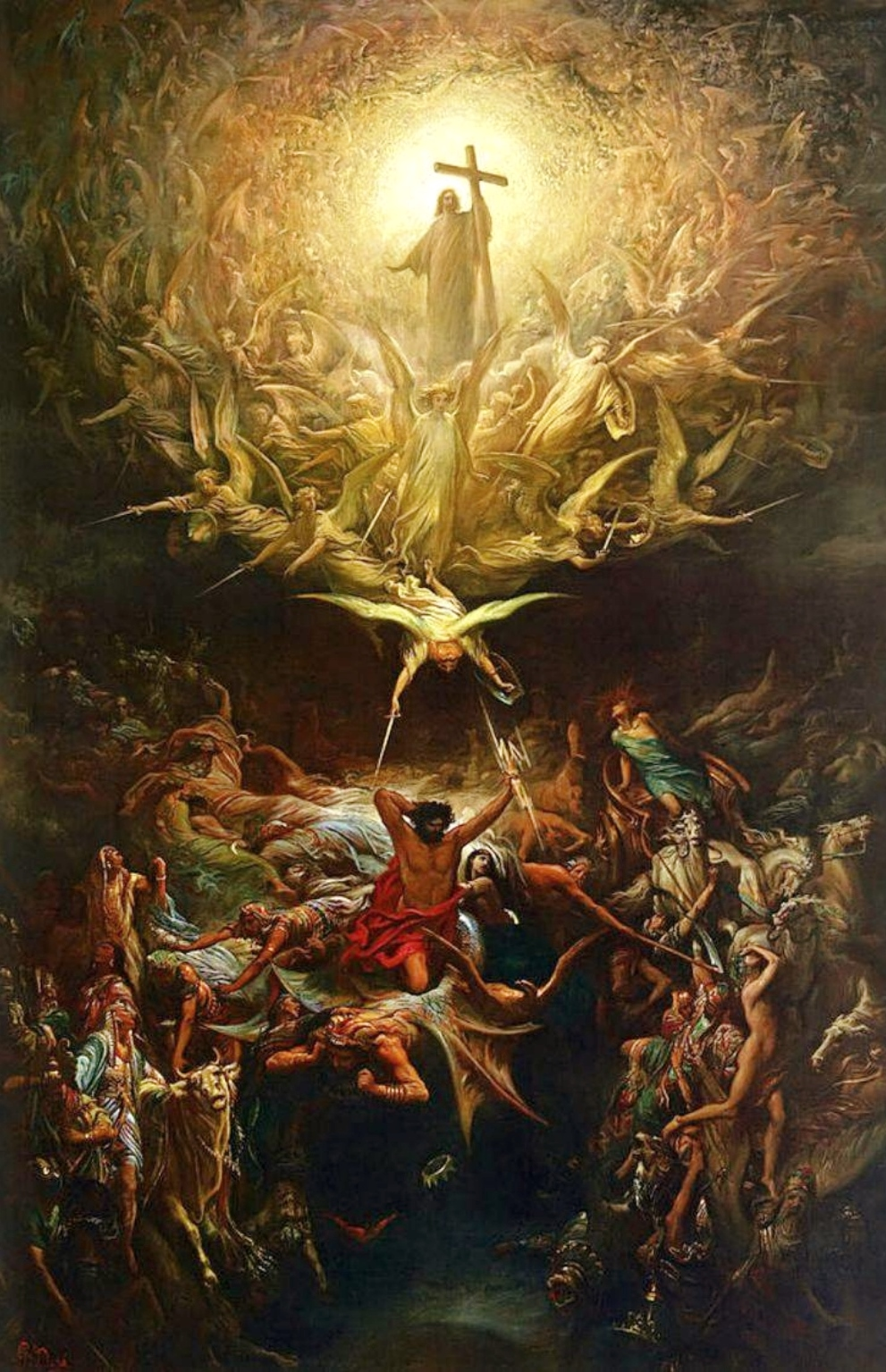
The Triumph Of Christianity Over Paganism (1868)
