= Le Poème de la Vigne =

Sculpture by Gustave Doré in San Francisco, California, U.S.

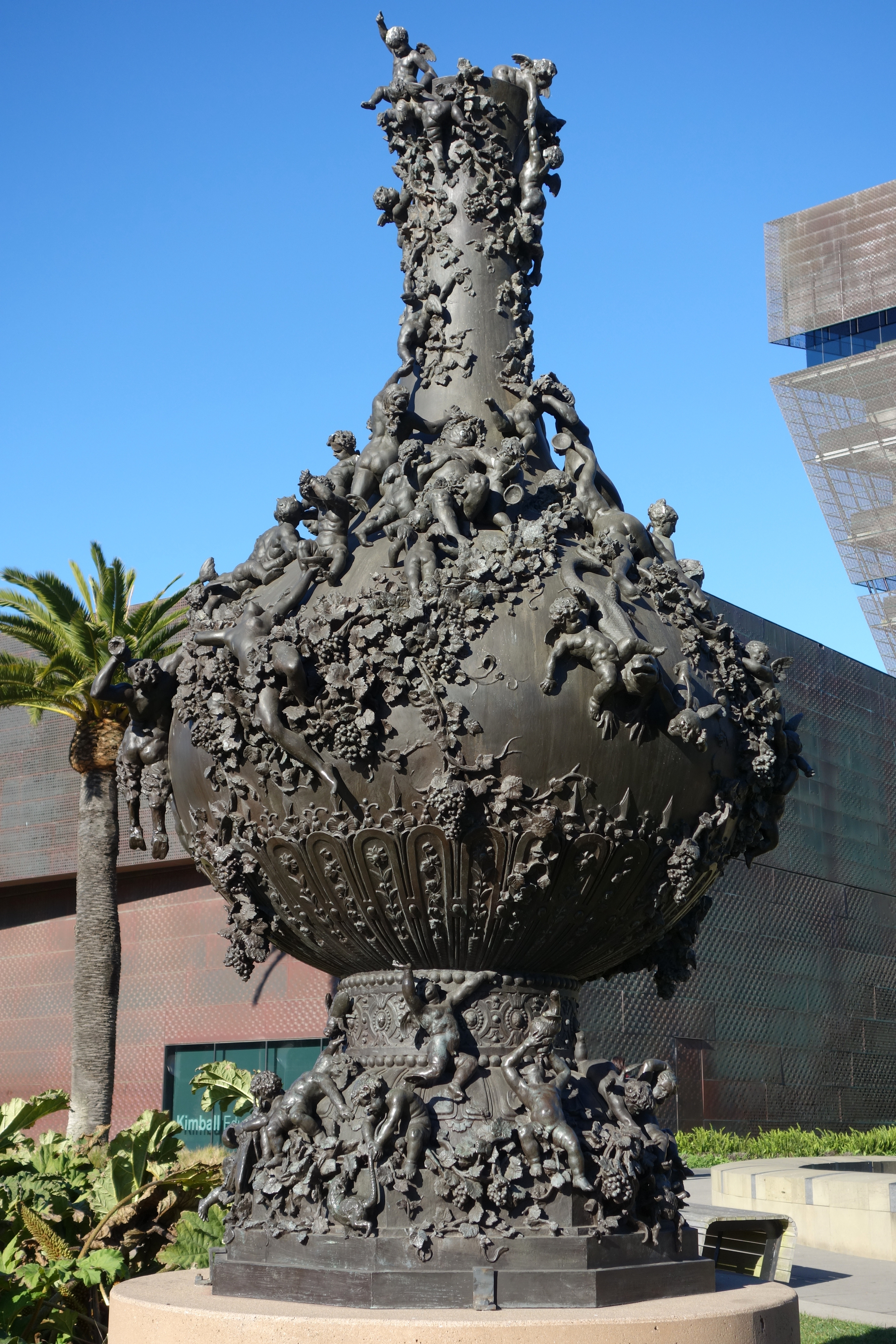
- The sculpture in 2013
- Artist: Gustave Doré
- Location: Golden Gate Park, San Francisco, California, U.S.
- 37°46′17.8″N 122°28′3.2″W

Le Poème de la Vigne is an 11 foot tall sculpture by Gustave Doré, created in 1878 for the Paris World's Fair. It is currently installed in San Francisco's Golden Gate Park, in the U.S. state of California.
