= 1945 in music =

This is a list of notable events in music that took place in the year 1945.

== Specific locations ==
- 1945 in British music
- 1945 in Norwegian music

== Specific genres ==
- 1945 in country music
- 1945 in jazz

== Events ==
- January 27 – Billboard has added a third chart to measure record popularity, "Records Most-Played On the Air". which will track disk jockey ("spinners", "dial twisters") activity.
- January 28 – Wilhelm Furtwängler conducts a concert in Vienna with the Vienna Philharmonic including a performance of Brahms' Symphony No. 2, which is recorded and is considered one of his greatest performances. Furtwängler, "within a few hours of being arrested" by the Gestapo (who are cracking down on liberals), flees to Switzerland.
- February 13–15 – Bombing of Dresden in World War II destroys the Semperoper (Saxon state opera house).
- February 13 – The premiere of Sergei Prokofiev's Symphony No. 5 under the composer's baton at the Moscow Conservatory is delayed by a military salute marking the Red Army's crossing of the Vistula.
- March 23 – The Orchestre National de la Radiodiffusion Francaise is reformed under this name.
- April 12 – The Berlin Philharmonic gives one of its final performances of the Nazi era in Berlin with various members of the military and political elite in attendance. Robert Heger conducts Brünnhilde's last aria (the Immolation Scene) and the finale from Richard Wagner's Götterdammerung, Beethoven's Violin Concerto and Anton Bruckner's Symphony No. 4. Members of the Hitler Youth offer cyanide capsules to the audience as they leave the building. The Battle of Berlin then forces the orchestra to close for two months.
- May 8 – VE Day: Grenadier Guards second lieutenant Humphrey Lyttelton joins in the celebrations by playing his trumpet in an impromptu performance in front of Buckingham Palace in London, inadvertently giving his first broadcast performance as the BBC is recording events.
- July 26 – Composer Ernest John Moeran marries cellist Peers Coetmore.
- July 27 – Benjamin Britten and Yehudi Menuhin perform concerts at Bergen-Belsen displaced persons camp.
- August 19 – Dick Powell marries June Allyson.
- September 1 – Trio Lescano's last concert on Italian radio.
- September 4 – Beethoven's Fidelio becomes the first opera to be performed in Berlin following World War II.
- October 25 – Philharmonia Orchestra plays its first concert, in London.
- November – Hans Schmidt-Isserstedt conducts the North German Radio Symphony Orchestra in its first concert.
- November 5 – Jerome Kern, who is just beginning to write a score for Annie Get Your Gun, collapses on a New York street due to a cerebral hemorrhage, dying on November 11.
- November 26 – Charlie Parker makes his first recording as a leader, also featuring Miles Davis.
- The Motion Picture Daily Fame Poll designates Bing Crosby "Top Male Vocalist" for the ninth straight year.
- Antal Doráti becomes conductor of the Dallas Symphony Orchestra.
- Reynaldo Hahn is appointed director of the Paris Opéra.
- Frank Sinatra leaves Your Hit Parade to appear on Max Factor Presents Frank Sinatra and, starting in September, Songs By Sinatra.
- Ruth Weston runs away from home in Portsmouth, Virginia, to marry trumpeter Jimmy Brown and begin her career as a singer.
- Marlene Dietrich appears on the CBS radio network, accompanied by accordionist John Serry Sr.

== Publications ==
- Spade Cooley – Spade Cooley's Western Swing Song Folio (the first songbook to identify the big Western dance band music as Western Swing)

== Albums released ==
- Nat King Cole – King Cole Trio
- Bing Crosby
  - Merry Christmas
  - Selections from Going My Way
- Glenn Miller – Glenn Miller
- Django Reinhardt – Paris 1945

== US charts 1945 ==
For the United States, charts are compiled from data published by Billboard magazine, using their own formulas with slight modifications. There are no songs missing or truncated by Billboard's holiday deadline. Each year, records included enter the charts between the prior November and early December. Each week, fifteen points are awarded to the number one record, then nine points for number two, eight points for number three, and so on. This system rewards songs that reach the highest positions, as well as those that had the longest chart runs, adjusting Whitburn's formula, which places no. 1 records on top, then no 2 and so on, ordered by weeks at that position.

Before the Hot100 was implemented in 1958, Billboard magazine measured a record's performance with three charts, 'Best-Selling Popular Retail Records', 'Records Most-Played On the Air' or 'Records Most Played By Disk Jockeys' and 'Most-Played Juke Box Records'. As Billboard did starting in the 1940s, the three totals for each song are combined, with that number determining the final year-end rank. For example, 1944's "A Hot Time in the Town of Berlin" by Bing and the Andrews Sisters finished at no. 19, despite six weeks at no. 1 on the 'Most-Played Juke Box Records'(JB) chart. It scored 126 points, to go with its Best-Selling chart (BS) total of 0. Martha Tilton's version of "I'll Walk Alone" peaked at no. 4 on the Juke Box chart, which only totalled 65 points, but her BS total was also 65, for a final total of 130, ranking no. 18. Examples like this can be found in "The Billboard" magazine up to 1958. The 'Records Most-Played On the Air' chart did not begin until January 1945.

The following songs appeared in The Billboard's 'Best Selling Retail Records', 'Records Most-Played On the Air' and 'Most Played Juke Box Records' charts during 1945.

Rank	Artist	Title	Label	Recorded	Released	Chart Positions
1	Les Brown and his Orchestra (Vocal Chorus by Doris Day)	"Sentimental Journey"	Columbia 36769	November 20, 1944	January 22, 1945	US 1945 #3, US #1 for 8 weeks, 28 total weeks, CashBox #2, Grammy Hall of Fame in 1998, 1,000,000 sales
2	Perry Como	"Till The End Of Time"	Victor 20-1709	July 3, 1945	July 30, 1945	US BB 1945 #2, US #1 for 9 weeks, 17 total weeks, CashBox #3, Grammy Hall of Fame in 1998, 1,000,000 sales
3	Johnny Mercer And The Pied Pipers	"On the Atchison, Topeka and the Santa Fe"	Capitol 195	December 13, 1944	July 1945	US BB 1945 #3, US #1 for 7 weeks, 19 total weeks, CashBox #7
4	Vaughn Monroe and his Orchestra	"There! I've Said It Again"	Victor 20-1637	December 17, 1944	February 1945	US BB 1945 #4, US #1 for 6 weeks (Air Play), 25 total weeks, CashBox #8
5	The Andrews Sisters	"Rum and Coca-Cola"	Decca 18636	October 23, 1944	December 1944	US 1945 #1, US #1 for 10 weeks (Juke Box), 21 total weeks, CashBox #6, 1,000,000 sales
6	Les Brown and his Orchestra (Vocal Chorus by Doris Day)	"My Dreams Are Getting Better All the Time"	Columbia 36779	February 3, 1945	February 15, 1945	US 1945 #5, US #1 for 7 weeks, 16 total weeks, CashBox #1, 1,000,000 sales
7	Swing And Sway With Sammy Kaye	"Chickery Chick"	Victor 20-1726	August 8, 1945	September 1945	US 1945 #8, US #1 for 4 weeks, 16 total weeks, 1,000,000 sales
8	Harry James and his Orchestra (Vocal Chorus by Kitty Kallen)	"It's Been a Long, Long Time"	Columbia 36838	July 24, 1945	September 17, 1945	US BB 1945 #6, US #1 for 4 weeks, 17 total weeks, CashBox #5
9	Johnny Mercer, Jo Stafford, and The Pied Pipers	"Candy"	Capitol 183	December 6, 1944	January 1945	US BB 1945 #14, US #1 for 1 week, 19 total weeks
10	Bing Crosby with Carmen Cavallaro on piano	"I Can't Begin to Tell You"	Decca 23457	August 7, 1945	October 1945	US BB 1945 #10, US #1 for 6 weeks (Juke Box), 19 total weeks, 1,000,000 sales
11	Johnny Mercer and The Pied Pipers	"Ac-Cent-Tchu-Ate the Positive"	Capitol 180	October 4, 1944	December 1944	US BB 1945 #11, US #1 for 2 weeks, 13 total weeks, Grammy Hall of Fame in 1998
12	Bing Crosby and Les Paul	"It's Been a Long, Long Time"	Decca 18708	July 12, 1945	September 1945	US BB 1945 #13, US #1 for 2 weeks, 16 total weeks
13	Carmen Cavallaro and His Orchestra	"Chopin's Polonaise"	Decca 18677	March 30, 1945	May 1945	US BB 1945 #14, US #3 for 10 weeks, 20 total weeks, 1,000,000 sales
14	Harry James and his Orchestra (Vocal Chorus by Kitty Kallen)	"I'm Beginning To See The Light"	Columbia 36758	November 24, 1944	December 18, 1944	US BB 1945 #10, US #1 for 2 weeks, 18 total weeks
15	Tony Pastor and his Orchestra	"Bell Bottom Trousers"	Victor 20-1661	April 4, 1945	May 1945	US BB 1945 #16, US #2 for 2 weeks, 15 total weeks
16	Benny Goodman and his Orchestra	"Gotta Be This Or That"	Columbia 36813	April 27, 1945	June 1945	US BB 1945 #18, US #2 for 1 week, 17 total weeks
17	Hal McIntyre and His Orchestra	"Sentimental Journey"	Victor 20-1643	February 9, 1945	April 1945	US BB 1945 #18, US #3 for 1 week, 19 total weeks
18	Helen Forrest & Dick Haymes	"I'll Buy That Dream"	Decca 23434	May 1, 1945	August 1945	US BB 1945 #19, US #2 for 1 week, 18 total weeks
19	Stan Kenton and His Orchestra	"Tampico"	Capitol 202	February 26, 1945	July 1945	US BB 1945 #20, US #3 for 1 weeks, 14 total weeks
20	The Pied Pipers	"Dream"	Capitol 185	December 10, 1944	February 1945	US BB 1945 #20, US #1 for 1 week, 18 total weeks

== Top race records ==
At the start of 1945, Billboard magazine published a chart ranking the "most popular records in Harlem" under the title of "the Harlem Hit Parade" (HHP). Rankings were based on a survey of record stores primarily in the Harlem district of New York City, an area which has historically been noted for its African American population. This chart was published for the final time in the issue dated February 10. The following week the magazine launched a new chart in its place, "Most Played Juke Box Race Records", based on reports from juke box operators (details can be found in each issue). For the year-end list of 1945's top R & B records below, peak positions and numbers of weeks from the HHP charts were carried over. 1945 chronological list of records that reached number one on the "Most Played Juke Box Race Records" chart.

Rank	Artist	Title	Label	Recorded	Released	Chart positions
1	Joe Liggins and His Honeydrippers	"The Honeydripper"	Exclusive 207	August 11, 1944	July 1945	US BB 1945 #191, US #16 for 1 week, 4 total weeks, US Most-Played Race Records 1945 #1, Harlem/Race Records #1 for 18 weeks, 27 total weeks
2	Lucky Millinder and His Orchestra	"Who Threw The Whiskey In The Well"	Decca 18674	June 9, 1944	May 1945	US BB 1945 #90, US #9 for 1 week, 10 total weeks, US Most-Played Race Records 1945 #2, Harlem/Race Records #1 for 8 weeks, 20 total weeks
3	Louis Jordan and His Tympany Five	"Caldonia"	Decca 8670	January 19, 1945	April 19, 1945	US BB 1945 #66, US #6 for 1 weeks, 8 total weeks, US Most-Played Race Records 1945 #3, Harlem/Race Records #1 for 7 weeks, 26 total weeks
4	Roosevelt Sykes and His Piano	"I Wonder"	Bluebird 34-0721	December 15, 1944	January 1945	US Most-Played Race Records 1945 #4, Harlem/Race Records #1 for 7 weeks, 13 total weeks
5	Erskine Hawkins and His Orchestra	"Tippin' In"	Victor 20-1639	January 10, 1945	March 1945	US BB 1945 #238, US #21 for 1 week, 2 total weeks, US Most-Played Race Records 1945 #5, Harlem/Race Records #1 for 6 weeks, 25 total weeks
6	Pvt. Cecil Gant	"I Wonder"	Gilt-Edge 500	August 30, 1944	September 1944	US BB 1945 #266, US #26 for 1 week, 1 total weeks, US Most-Played Race Records 1945 #6, Harlem/Race Records #1 for 2 weeks, 28 total weeks
7	Louis Jordan and His Tympany Five	"Mop Mop"	Decca 8668	March 15, 1944	October 1944	US Most-Played Race Records 1945 #7, Harlem/Race Records #1 for 1 weeks, 17 total weeks
8	Jimmie Lunceford and His Orchestra	"The Honeydripper"	Decca 23451	February 26, 1945	April 1945	US BB 1945 #247, US #21 for 1 week, 4 total weeks, US Most-Played Race Records 1945 #8, Harlem/Race Records #2 for 8 weeks, 9 total weeks
9	Louis Jordan and His Tympany Five	"You Can't Get That No More"	Decca 8668	March 15, 1944	October 1944	US BB 1945 #189, US #15 for 1 week, 1 total weeks, US Most-Played Race Records 1945 #9, Harlem/Race Records #2 for 4 weeks, 13 total weeks
10	Lionel Hampton and His Orchestra	"Beulah's Boogie"	Decca 18719	May 21, 1945	November 1945	US Most-Played Race Records 1945 #10, Harlem/Race Records #2 for 4 weeks, 9 total weeks

== Published popular music ==
- "All of My Life", words and music: Irving Berlin
- "All Through the Day" w. Oscar Hammerstein II m. Jerome Kern
- "Along the Navajo Trail" w.m. Dick Charles, Eddie DeLange & Larry Markes
- "Apple Honey" m. Woody Herman
- "Aren't You Glad You're You?" w. Johnny Burke m. Jimmy Van Heusen
- "Atlanta G.A." w. Sunny Skylar m. Arthur Shaftel
- "Autumn Serenade" w. Sammy Gallop m. Peter DeRose
- "Be-Baba-Leba" w.m. Helen Humes
- "The Blond Sailor" w. (Eng) Mitchell Parish, Bell Leib m. Jacob Pfeil
- "Boogie Blues" w.m. Gene Krupa & Ray Biondi
- "Caldonia" w.m. Fleecie Moore
- "The Carousel Waltz" w. Richard Rodgers
- "Cement Mixer" w.m. Slim Gaillard & Lee Ricks
- "Close as Pages in a Book" w. Dorothy Fields m. Sigmund Romberg. Introduced by Maureen Cannon and Wilbur Evans in the musical Up in Central Park
- "Cruising Down the River" w.m. Eily Beadell & Nell Tollerton
- "Day By Day" w. Sammy Cahn m. Paul Weston & Axel Stordahl
- "Detour" w.m. Paul Westmoreland
- "Dig You Later" w. Harold Adamson m. Jimmy McHugh
- "Doctor, Lawyer, Indian Chief" w. Paul Francis Webster m. Hoagy Carmichael
- "Don't Be a Baby, Baby" w. Buddy Kaye m. Howard Steiner
- "Dos gardenias" w.m. Isolina Carrillo
- "The End of the News" w.m. Noël Coward
- "Everything But You" w.m. Don George, Duke Ellington and Harry James.
- "For Sentimental Reasons" w. Deek Watson m. William Best
- "The Frim Fram Sauce" w.m. Joe Ricardel & Redd Evans
- "Full Moon and Empty Arms" w.m. Buddy Kaye & Ted Mossman
- "Give Me the Moon Over Brooklyn" w.m. Jason Matthews & Terry Shand
- "Give Me the Simple Life" w. Harry Ruby m. Rube Bloom
- "Gongxi Gongxi" w.m. Chen Gexin
- "Gotta Be This or That" w.m. Sunny Skylar
- "Guess I'll Hang My Tears Out to Dry" w. Sammy Cahn m. Jule Styne
- "Gugur Bunga" w.m. Ismail Marzuki
- "The Gypsy" w.m. Billy Reid
- "Have I Told You Lately that I Love You?" w.m. Scott Wiseman
- "Her Bathing Suit Never Got Wet" w. Charles Tobias m. Nat Simon
- "Hey! Ba-Ba-Re-Bop" w.m. Lionel Hampton & Curley Hamner
- "Homesick – That's All" w.m. Gordon Jenkins
- "The Honeydripper" w.m. Joe Liggins
- "I Can't Begin to Tell You" w. Mack Gordon m. James V. Monaco. Introduced by John Payne and reprised by Betty Grable in the film The Dolly Sisters
- "I Have But One Heart" Marty Symes, J. Farrow
- "I Wish I Knew" w. Mack Gordon m. Harry Warren. Introduced by Dick Haymes in the film Diamond Horseshoe
- "I Wonder What Happened To Him" w.m. Noël Coward
- "If I Loved You" w. Oscar Hammerstein II m. Richard Rodgers. Introduced by John Raitt and Jan Clayton in the musical Carousel.
- "In Acapulco" w. Mack Gordon m. Harry Warren. Introduced by Betty Grable in the film Diamond Horseshoe
- "In Love In Vain" w. Leo Robin m. Jerome Kern. Introduced by Louanne Hogan dubbing for Jeanne Crain in the film Centennial Summer
- "Isn't It Kinda Fun" w. Oscar Hammerstein II m. Richard Rodgers. Introduced by Dick Haymes and Vivian Blaine in the film State Fair. Performed in the 1962 film version by Ann-Margret and David Street
- "It Might as Well Be Spring" w. Oscar Hammerstein II m. Richard Rodgers. Introduced by Louanne Hogan dubbing for Jeanne Crain in the film State Fair. Performed in the 1962 film version by Anita Gordon dubbing for Pamela Tiffin.
- "It's a Grand Night For Singing" w. Oscar Hammerstein II m. Richard Rodgers
- "It's Been a Long, Long Time" w. Sammy Cahn m. Jule Styne
- "June is Bustin' Out All Over" w. Oscar Hammerstein II m. Richard Rodgers
- "Kalaniyot" w. Nathan Alterman m. Moshe Vilensky
- "La Mer" w.m. Charles Trenet
- "Laura" w. Johnny Mercer m. David Raksin
- "Lavender Blue" w. Larry Morey m. Eliot Daniel
- "Leone Jump" m. John Serry Sr.
- "Let It Snow! Let It Snow! Let It Snow!" w. Sammy Cahn m. Jule Styne
- "Lily Belle" w.m. Dave Franklin & Irving Taylor
- "Love Letters" w. Edward Heyman m. Victor Young
- "Love on a Greyhound Bus" w. Ralph Blane & Kay Thompson m. George Stoll
- "Matelot" w.m. Noël Coward. Introduced by Graham Payn in the revue Sigh No More
- "Mister Snow" w. Oscar Hammerstein II m. Richard Rodgers
- "The More I See You" w. Mack Gordon m. Harry Warren
- "Nina" w.m. Noël Coward
- "Oh! What It Seemed To Be" w.m. Bennie Benjamin, George David Weiss & Frankie Carle
- "Personality" w. Johnny Burke m. Jimmy Van Heusen
- "Rodger Young" w.m. Frank Loesser
- "Shoo-Fly Pie and Apple Pan Dowdy" w. Sammy Gallop m. Guy Wood
- "Sigh No More" w.m. Noël Coward
- "Sioux City Sue" w. Ray Freedman m. Dick Thomas
- "Soliloquy" w. Oscar Hammerstein II m. Richard Rodgers
- "Some Sunday Morning" w. Ted Koehler m. M.K. Jerome & Ray Heindorf
- "A Stranger in Town" w.m. Mel Tormé
- "Symphony (C'est fini)" w.m. Alex Alstone, André Tabet and Roger Bernstein
- "Tampico" w.m. Allan Roberts & Doris Fisher
- "(Did You Ever Get) That Feeling in the Moonlight?" w.m. James Cavanaugh, Larry Stock & Ira Schuster
- "That Little Dream Got Nowhere" w. Johnny Burke m. Jimmy Van Heusen
- "That's for Me" w. Oscar Hammerstein II m. Richard Rodgers
- "This Was a Real Nice Clambake" w. Oscar Hammerstein II m. Richard Rodgers
- "Till the End of Time" w.m. Buddy Kaye & Ted Mossman
- "We'll Be Together Again" w. Frankie Laine m. Carl Fischer
- "We'll Gather Lilacs" w.m. Ivor Novello
- "What's the Use of Wond'rin'?" w. Oscar Hammerstein II m. Richard Rodgers
- "When the Children Are Asleep" w. Oscar Hammerstein II m. Richard Rodgers
- "The Wild, Wild West" w. Johnny Mercer m. Harry Warren from the film The Harvey Girls
- "Wir weihn der Erde Gaben" w. Petronia Steiner (hymn)
- "You'll Never Walk Alone" w. Oscar Hammerstein II m. Richard Rodgers
- "You're a Queer One, Julie Jordan" w. Oscar Hammerstein II m. Richard Rodgers

== Classical music ==
=== Premieres ===
Composer	Composition	Date	Location	Performers
Boulez, Pierre	Three Psalmodies for Piano	1945-02-12	Paris	Grimaud
Britten, Benjamin	Four Sea Interludes from Peter Grimes	1945-06-13	Cheltenham Music Festival, UK	London Philharmonic – Britten
Britten, Benjamin	Passacaglia from Peter Grimes	1945-08-29	London	BBC Symphony – Boult
Britten, Benjamin	String Quartet No. 2	1945-11-21	London	Zorian Quartet
Carpenter, John Alden	The Seven Ages	1945-12-02	New York City	New York Philharmonic – Rodzinski
Copland, Aaron	Jubilee Variation on a Theme of Goossens	1945-03-23	Cincinnati, Ohio	Cincinnati Symphony – Goossens
Finzi, Gerald	Earth and Air and Rain (1935)	1945-07-02	London	Falkner, Ferguson
Ginastera, Alberto	Las horas de una estancia	1945-06-11	Montevideo, Uruguay	Baridon, Satalia de Perna
Ginastera, Alberto	Psalm 150	1945-04-07	Buenos Aires	Teatro Colón Regular Orchestra and Chorus – Wolff
Jolivet, André	Le chant de Linos (quintet version)	1945-06-01	Paris	Jamet Quintet
Jolivet, André	Trois chansons de ménestrels	1945-02-10	Paris	Dyonis, Soulage
Khachaturian, Aram	Fantasy on Russian Themes	1945-11-06	Moscow	USSR State Radio Symphony – Gorchakov
Kodály, Zoltán	Missa brevis	1945-02-11	Budapest	[unknown performers]
Lutosławski, Witold	Wind Trio	1945-09-??	Krákow, Poland	Snieckowski, Rudnicki, Orlow
Malipiero, Gian Francesco	Sinfonia delle campane (Symphony No. 3)	1945-11-04	Florence	[unknown orchestra] – Markevitch
Martinů, Bohuslav	Symphony No. 3	1945-10-12	Boston	Boston Symphony – Koussevitzky
Messiaen, Olivier	Trois petites liturgies de la présence divine	1945-04-21	Paris	Loriod, Martenot / Paris Conservatory Concert Society Orchestra – Désormière
Messiaen, Olivier	Vingt regards sur l'enfant-Jésus	1945-03-23	Paris	Loriod
Novák, Vítězslav	May Symphony	1945-12-05	Prague	[unknown performers]
Piston, Walter	Sonatina for Violin and Harpsichord	1945-11-30	New York City	Schneider, Kirkpatrick
Prokofiev, Sergei	Symphony No. 5	1945-01-13	Moscow	USSR State Symphony – Prokofiev
Shostakovich, Dmitri	Symphony No. 9	1945-11-03	Leningrad	Leningrad Philharmonic – Mravinsky
Stravinsky, Igor	Elegy for Viola	1945-01-26	Washington DC	Prévost
Tippett, Michael	Symphony No. 1	1945-11-10	Liverpool	Royal Liverpool Philharmonic – Sargent
Tubin, Eduard	Capriccio for Violin and Piano No. 2	1945-09-25	Stockholm	Aumere, Roots
Villa-Lobos, Heitor	String Quartet No. 7	1945-05-30	Theatro Municipal (Rio de Janeiro)	Quarteto Borgerth
Castelnuovo-Tedesco / Milhaud / Schoenberg / Shilkret / Stravinsky / Tansman / Toch	Genesis Suite	1945-11-18	Los Angeles	Janssen Symphony – Janssen

=== Compositions ===
- Samuel Barber – Cello Concerto
- Béla Bartók
  - Piano Concerto No. 3
  - Viola Concerto
- Ernest Bloch – String Quartet No. 2
- Benjamin Britten
  - The Holy Sonnets of John Donne for tenor and piano, Op. 35
  - String Quartet No. 2 in C major
- John A. Carpenter – The Seven Ages
- George Crumb
  - Four Pieces for violin and piano
  - Sonata for Piano
  - Four Songs for voice, clarinet and piano
- Luigi Dallapiccola – Ciaccona, Intermezzo e Adagio, for solo cello
- Wolfgang Fortner – Sonata for violin and piano
- Jesús Guridi – Pyrenean Symphony
- Paul Hindemith – String Quartet No. 7 in E-flat
- Dmitry Kabalevsky – Piano Sonata No. 2
- Paul von Klenau – Symphony No. 9
- Erich W. Korngold – Violin Concerto
- Rued Langgaard
  - Symphony No. 10 Hin Tordenbolig, BVN. 298
  - Symphony No. 11 Ixion, BVN. 303
- G. Francesco Malipiero – Symphony No. 3
- Frank Martin – Petite symphonie concertante
- Bohuslav Martinů
  - Etudes and Polkas, H. 308, for piano
  - Flute Sonata, H 306
  - Cello Concerto No. 2, H 304
  - Czech Rhapsody, H 307
  - Symphony No. 4, H 305
  - Thunderbolt P-47, scherzo for orchestra, H 309
- Olivier Messiaen – Harawi
- Douglas Moore – Symphony No. 2
- Walter Piston – Sonatina for Violin and Harpsichord
- Sergei Prokofiev – Ivan the Terrible
- Nico Richter – Serenade for flute, violin and viola
- Henri Sauguet – Les forains, ballet
- Dmitri Shostakovich
  - Symphony No. 9
  - Children's Notebook
- Richard Strauss
  - Metamorphosen for 23 solo strings
  - Oboe Concerto
- Igor Stravinsky
  - Ebony Concerto
  - Symphony in Three Movements
- Michael Tippett – Symphony No. 1
- Various composers (Castelnuovo-Tedesco, Milhaud, Schoenberg, Shilkret, Stravinsky, Tansman and Toch) – Genesis Suite
- Heitor Villa-Lobos
  - Piano Concerto No. 1
  - String Quartet No. 9
  - Symphony No. 7 Odisséia da paz (Peace Odyssey)
- Paul Ben-Haim
  - Symphony No. 2, Op. 36
  - Pastorale variée, for clarinet and orchestra, Op. 31b

== Opera ==
- Amy Beach – Cabildo (Athens, Georgia, 27 February)
- Benjamin Britten – Peter Grimes
- Frederick Jacobi – The Prodigal Son

== Film ==
- Aaron Copland – The Cummington Story
- Aram Khachaturian – Prisoner No. 217
- Miklós Rózsa
  - The Lost Weekend
  - Spellbound
- Max Steiner – Mildred Pierce (film)

== Musical theatre ==
- Are You with It? (Music: Harry Revel Lyrics: Arnold B. Horwitt Book: Sam Perrin and George Balzer). Broadway production opened at the Century Theatre on November 10 and ran for 266 performances.
- Billion Dollar Baby (Music: Morton Gould Book & Lyrics: Betty Comden and Adolph Green). Broadway production opened at the Alvin Theatre on December 21 and ran for 220 performances. Starring Mitzi Green, Joan McCracken, William Tabbert, Danny Daniels and Shirley Van.
- Carib Song (Music: Baldwin Bergersen Book & Lyrics: William Archibald. Broadway production opened at the Adelphi Theatre on September 27 and ran for 36 performances.
- Carousel (Music: Richard Rodgers Lyrics and Book: Oscar Hammerstein II). Broadway production opened at the Majestic Theatre on April 19 and ran for 890 performances.
- The Day Before Spring (Music: Frederick Loewe Lyrics and Book: Alan Jay Lerner). Broadway production opened on November 22 at the National Theatre and ran for 165 performances.
- The Firebrand of Florence (Book: Ira Gershwin & Edwin Justus Mayer, Music: Kurt Weill, Lyrics: Ira Gershwin). Broadway production opened at the Alvin Theatre on March 22 and ran for 43 performances. Starring Lotte Lenya, Earl Wrightson, Beverly Tyler and Melville Cooper.
- Follow The Girls (Music: Phil Charig Lyrics: Dan Shapiro and Milton Pascal Book: Guy Bolton, Eddie Davis and Fred Thompson). London production opened at His Majesty's Theatre on October 25 and ran for 572 performances.
- Marinka. Broadway production opened at the Winter Garden Theatre on July 18 and moved to the Ethel Barrymore Theatre on October 1 for a total run of 165 performances
- Perchance To Dream (Music, Lyrics and Book: Ivor Novello). London production opened at the London Hippodrome on April 21 and ran for 1022 performances.
- The Red Mill (Music: Victor Herbert Lyrics and Book: Henry Blossom). Broadway revival opened on October 16 at the Ziegfeld Theatre and ran for 531 performances.
- Sigh No More. London revue opened at the Piccadilly Theatre on August 28
- Under the Counter. London production opened at the Phoenix Theatre on November 22 and ran for 665 performances
- Up in Central Park (Music: Sigmund Romberg Lyrics: Dorothy Fields Book: Herbert Fields and Dorothy Fields). Broadway production opened at the Century Theatre on January 27 and ran for 504 performances.

== Musical films ==
- Anchors Aweigh starring Frank Sinatra, Kathryn Grayson and Gene Kelly. Directed by George Sidney.
- The Bells of St. Mary's starring Ingrid Bergman and Bing Crosby. Directed by Leo McCarey.
- Blonde from Brooklyn released June 21, starring Lynn Merrick and Richard Stanton, with Gwen Verdon in a minor role.
- Blonde Ransom starring Donald Cook and Virginia Grey. Directed by William Beaudine.
- Bring on the Girls starring Veronica Lake, Sonny Tufts, Eddie Bracken and Marjorie Reynolds and featuring Spike Jones and his Orchestra.
- Abbott and Costello in Hollywood starring Bud Abbott, Lou Costello, Frances Rafferty, Bob Stanton and Jean Porter. Directed by S. Sylvan Simon.
- Delightfully Dangerous starring Jane Powell, Ralph Bellamy, Constance Moore, Arthur Treacher and Morton Gould & his Orchestra. Directed by Arthur Lubin.
- Diamond Horseshoe aka Billy Rose's Diamond Horseshoe starring Betty Grable, Dick Haymes, Phil Silvers, William Gaxton and Beatrice Kay and featuring vaudevillian Willie Solar in his only filmed performance.
- The Dolly Sisters released November 14 starring Betty Grable, June Haver and John Payne.
- Duffy's Tavern starring Ed Gardner, Betty Hutton, Bing Crosby, Paulette Goddard, Dorothy Lamour, Eddie Bracken, Sonny Tufts, Barry Fitzgerald and Veronica Lake. Directed by Hal Walker.
- Eadie Was a Lady starring Ann Miller
- Here Come the Co-Eds starring Bud Abbott, Lou Costello and Peggy Ryan. Directed by Edgar Fairchild.
- Hit the Hay starring Judy Canova
- Let's Go Steady released January 4 starring Pat Parrish and Jackie Moran and featuring Mel Tormé and Skinnay Ennis.
- Nob Hill starring George Raft, Joan Bennett and Vivian Blaine.
- Out of This World starring Eddie Bracken, Veronica Lake and Cass Daley
- Rhapsody in Blue starring Robert Alda, Joan Leslie and Alexis Smith and featuring Hazel Scott.
- A Song for Miss Julie starring Shirley Ross
- State Fair starring Dick Haymes, Jeanne Crain, Dana Andrews and Vivian Blaine.
- The Stork Club starring Betty Hutton, Barry Fitzgerald, Don DeFore, Andy Russell and Robert Benchley
- Thrill of a Romance starring Van Johnson and Esther Williams and featuring Lauritz Melchior
- Tonight and Every Night starring Rita Hayworth, Lee Bowman and Janet Blair.
- Yolanda and the Thief starring Fred Astaire, Lucille Bremer, Frank Morgan, Mildred Natwick and Mary Nash. Directed by Vincente Minnelli.

== Births ==
- January 3 – Stephen Stills, singer-songwriter and guitarist
- January 10 – Rod Stewart, rock singer
- January 15 – Joan Marie Johnson, pop singer (The Dixie Cups) (died 2016)
- January 17
  - William "Poogie" Hart, R&B singer-songwriter (The Delfonics)
  - Ivan Karabyts, Ukrainian conductor and composer (died 2002)
- January 20 – Eric Stewart, singer-songwriter (The Mindbenders, 10cc)
- January 26
  - Jacqueline du Pré, cellist (died 1987)
  - Ashley Hutchings, folk rock musician (Fairport Convention)
- January 28 – Robert Wyatt, Canterbury scene musician
- February 6 – Bob Marley, reggae singer-songwriter, musician and guitarist (died 1981)
- February 12 – Roman Tam, Hong Kong singer (died 2002)
- February 14 – Vic Briggs, blues and rock guitarist (The Animals) (died 2021)
- February 20 – Alan Hull, folk rock singer-songwriter (Lindisfarne) (died 1995)
- February 26
  - Bob Hite, blues rock singer (Canned Heat) (died 1981)
  - Mitch Ryder, rock and blues singer
- February 27 – Carl Anderson, actor and singer (died 2004)
- March 6 – Hugh Grundy, rock drummer (The Zombies)
- March 7 – Arthur Lee (Love) (died 2006)
- March 8 – Micky Dolenz, singer, songwriter and actor (The Monkees)
- March 9 – Robin Trower rock guitarist and singer (Procol Harum)
- March 10 – Ramón Ayala, accordion player and norteño
- March 14
  - Jasper Carrott, English comedian, actor and musician
  - Michael Martin Murphey, American singer-songwriter and guitarist
  - Walter Parazaider, American saxophonist (Chicago)
  - Herman van Veen, Dutch singer-songwriter and actor
- March 17 – Sheryl Cormier, American Cajun accordionist
- March 17 – Elis Regina, Brazilian singer (died 1982)
- March 19 – Cem Karaca, Turkish rock musician
- March 20 – Teddy Robin, Hong Kong English pop singer-songwriter, actor, director and producer (Teddy Robin and the Playboys)
- March 28 – Charles Portz, rock guitar bassist (The Turtles)
- March 30 – Eric Clapton, blues guitarist and singer
- April 1 – John Barbata, American rock drummer (Jefferson Starship, The Turtles)
- April 9 – Steve Gadd, American session drummer
- April 13 – Lowell George (Little Feat)
- April 14 – Ritchie Blackmore (Deep Purple, Rainbow)
- April 20 – Frank DiLeo, American actor and music industry executive
- April 24 – Robert Knight, singer (died 2017)
- April 25
  - Stu Cook, rock bass guitarist (Creedence Clearwater Revival)
  - Björn Ulvaeus, singer-songwriter (ABBA)
- April 28 – John Wolters (Dr. Hook & the Medicine Show)
- April 29 – Tammi Terrell, Soul singer (died 1970)
- May 1 – Rita Coolidge, singer
- May 2
  - Goldy McJohn, Steppenwolf (died 2017)
  - Judge Dread, English reggae singer/rapper (died 1998)
- May 4 – Georg Wadenius (Blood, Sweat & Tears)
- May 6
  - Bob Seger, singer-songwriter
  - Jimmie Dale Gilmore, country musician
- May 7 – Christy Moore, folk musician
- May 8 – Keith Jarrett, pianist and composer
- May 9 – Steve Katz, jazz-rock guitarist, singer and producer (Blues Project, Blood, Sweat & Tears)
- May 12 – Ian McLagan, keyboard player (The Faces) (died 2014)
- May 13 – Magic Dick, rock harmonica player (The J. Geils Band)
- May 19 – Pete Townshend, rock guitarist and singer-songwriter (The Who)
- May 24 – Priscilla Presley, wife of Elvis
- May 27 – Bruce Cockburn, Canadian singer/songwriter
- May 28
  - John Fogerty, rock singer-songwriter and guitarist (Creedence Clearwater Revival)
  - Gary Stewart, American singer (died 2003)
  - Chayito Valdez, folk singer (died 2016)
- May 29 – Gary Brooker, rock singer-songwriter and keyboardist (Procol Harum) (died 2022)
- June 1
  - Linda Scott, singer
  - Frederica von Stade, operatic mezzo-soprano
- June 2 – Lord David Dundas, singer and composer
- June 4
  - Gordon Waller, singer (Peter and Gordon) (died 2009)
  - Anthony Braxton, avant-garde jazz composer
- June 14 – Rod Argent, rock keyboardist and singer (The Zombies, Argent)
- June 20 – Anne Murray, singer
- June 24 – Colin Blunstone, rock singer (The Zombies)
- June 25
  - Labi Siffre, singer-songwriter
- June 28 – David Knights, rock guitar bassist (Procol Harum)
- July 1
  - Mike Burstyn, American actor and singer
  - Debbie Harry, American singer-songwriter and actress (Blondie)
- July 6 – Rik Elswit, rock guitarist (Dr. Hook & the Medicine Show)
- July 14 – Jim Gordon, rock drummer (Derek and the Dominos) (died 2023)
- July 15 – Peter Lewis (Moby Grape)
- July 18 – Danny McCulloch (The Animals) (died 2015)
- July 20
  - Kim Carnes, singer
- July 29 - Mike Garson, American pianist
- July 30 – David Sanborn, saxophonist (died 2024)
- August 5 – Stoika Milanova, Bulgarian violinist (died 2024)
- August 12 – Ron Mael, American keyboardist (Sparks, FFS)
- August 16 – Gary Loizzo, American rock singer and guitarist (The American Breed) (died 2016)
- August 18 – Barbara Harris, American pop singer (The Toys)
- August 19 – Ian Gillan, English rock singer (Deep Purple)
- August 24
  - Ronee Blakley, American actress, singer-songwriter and composer
  - Molly Duncan, Scottish blues tenor saxophonist (Average White Band) (died 2019)
  - Ken Hensley, English hard rock singer-songwriter (Uriah Heep) (died 2020)
- August 31
  - Van Morrison, Northern Irish musician
  - Itzhak Perlman, Israeli-born American violinist
  - Bob Welch, American musician and singer (died 2012)
- September 4 – Bill Kenwright, producer of West End musicals (died 2023)
- September 5 – Al Stewart, singer-songwriter
- September 8
  - Ron "Pigpen" McKernan, rock musician (Grateful Dead) (died 1973)
  - Kelly Groucutt, rock musician (Electric Light Orchestra) (died 2009)
- September 9
  - Richard Divall, conductor and musicologist (died 2017)
  - Dee Dee Sharp, R&B singer
- September 10 – Jose Feliciano, singer-songwriter and guitarist
- September 15 – Jessye Norman, operatic soprano (died 2019)
- September 17 – Danny Rivera, singer
- September 19 – David Bromberg, guitarist
- September 23 – Paul Petersen, singer and actor
- September 24 – John Rutter, choral composer
- September 25 – Owen "Onnie" McIntyre, soul guitarist and singer (Average White Band)
- September 26
  - Gal Costa, Brazilian singer
  - Bryan Ferry, English singer-songwriter
- October 1 – Donny Hathaway, singer and musician (died 1979)
- October 2 – Don McLean, singer-songwriter
- October 7 – Kevin Godley, singer-songwriter
- October 9 – Chucho Valdés, jazz musician
- October 10 – Alan Cartwright (Procol Harum) (died 2021)
- October 13 – Christophe, singer-songwriter (died 2020)
- October 19 – Jeannie C. Riley, country singer
- October 22 – Leslie West (Mountain) (The Vagrants) (died in 2020)
- October 28 – Wayne Fontana, beat singer (died 2020)
- October 29 – Melba Moore, singer
- October 31 – Russ Ballard, singer-songwriter (Argent)
- November 8
  - Donald Murray (The Turtles)
  - Arnold Rosner, composer (died 2013)
- November 10 – Donna Fargo, country musician
- November 11
  - Chris Dreja, British rock guitarist (The Yardbirds) (died 2025)
  - Vince Martell, American rock guitarist (Vanilla Fudge)
- November 12 – Neil Young, singer-songwriter
- November 13 – Bobby Manuel, American guitarist and producer (Booker T. & the M.G.'s)
- November 15 – Anni-Frid Lyngstad, singer (ABBA)
- November 16 – Teenie Hodges, American guitarist and songwriter (Hi Rhythm Section) (died 2014)
- November 20 – Dan McBride (Sha Na Na) (died 2009)
- November 24 – Lee Michaels, keyboardist and singer
- November 26 – John McVie, guitarist (Fleetwood Mac)
- November 30 – Radu Lupu, classical pianist (died 2022)
- December 1 – Bette Midler, American singer and actress
- December 10 – Toots Hibbert, Jamaican reggae singer-songwriter (Toots & the Maytals) (died 2020)
- December 12
  - Allan Ward, English beat guitarist (The Honeycombs)
  - Tony Williams, American drummer, composer and producer (The Tony Williams Lifetime) (died 1997)
- December 14 – Stanley Crouch, American music critic (died 2020)
- December 20 – Peter Criss, American hard-rock drummer (KISS)
- December 23 – Ron Bushy, American rock drummer (Iron Butterfly) (died 2021)
- December 24 – Lemmy, born Ian Kilmister, English heavy metal musician (Motörhead) (died 2015)
- December 25 – Noel Redding, English rock guitar bassist (Jimi Hendrix Experience) (died 2003)
- December 27 – Clarence Barlow, Indian-born British composer (died 2023)
- December 30 – Davy Jones, English singer and actor (died 2012)
- date unknown – Abed Azrie, Syrian-born French singer

== Deaths ==
- January 4 – Michael Coleman, fiddle player (born 1891)
- January 17 – Malcolm McEachern, operatic bass (born 1883)
- January 30 – Herbert L. Clarke, cornet virtuoso and composer (born 1867)
- February – David Beigelman, violinist, orchestra leader and composer (born 1887) (murdered in Auschwitz concentration camp)
- February 5 – Volga Hayworth, showgirl (born 1897)
- February 7 – Aldo Finzi, composer (born 1897)
- February 11 – Al Dubin, songwriter (born 1891)
- February 25 – Mário de Andrade, writer and musicologist (born 1893)
- March 2 – Jean-Baptiste Lemire, composer (born 1867)
- March 3 – Blanche Arral, operatic soprano (born 1864)
- April 1 – May Beatty, New Zealand singer (born 1880)
- April 4 – Berta Bock, Romanian composer (born 1857)
- April 15 – Raffaello Squarise, violinist, conductor and composer (born 1856)
- April 19 – Alois Burgstaller, operatic tenor (born 1872)
- April 25
  - Huldreich Georg Früh, Swiss composer (born 1903)
  - Elmer Samuel Hosmer, composer (born 1862)
  - Teddy Weatherford, jazz pianist (born 1903) (cholera)
- April 29 – Dezso d'Antalffy, Hungarian organist and composer (born 1885)
- May 12 – Will C. Macfarlane, English-born American organist and composer (born 1870)
- May 15 – Kenneth J. Alford, band composer (born 1881)
- May 31 – Gustave Huberdeau, operatic bass-baritone (born 1874)
- June 8 - T. Mayo Geary, songwriter and music publishing executive (born 1879)
- June 26 – Nikolai Tcherepnin, composer (born 1873)
- June 28 – Jonny Heykens, Dutch composer and orchestra leader (born 1884)
- July 24 – Rosina Storchio, operatic soprano (born 1876)
- August 2
  - Pietro Mascagni, composer (born 1863)
  - Emil von Reznicek, composer (born 1860)
- August 19 – Carl Wilhelm Kern, pianist and composer (born 1874)
- August 23 – Leo Borchard, conductor (born 1899) (shot)
- August 31 – Elsa Stralia, operatic soprano (born 1881)
- September 8 – Leo Rich Lewis, American composer (born 1865
- September 10 – Väinö Raitio, Finnish composer (born 1891)
- September 15 – Anton Webern, Austrian composer (born 1883) (shot)
- September 16 – John McCormack, Irish tenor (born 1884)
- September 18 – Blind Willie Johnson, American gospel singer and guitarist (born 1897) (pneumonia)
- September 25 – Julius Korngold, Austrian music critic (born 1860)
- September 26 – Béla Bartók, Hungarian composer (born 1881)
- October 9 – Fernando Obradors, Spanish composer (born 1896)
- October 16 – James V. Monaco, Italian-born US composer (born 1885)
- November 3 – Alessandro Longo, composer and musicologist (born 1864)
- November 7 – Gus Edwards, Prussian-born US songwriter, entertainer and producer (born 1879)
- November 11 – Jerome Kern, composer (born 1885) (cerebral haemorrhage)
- December 24 – Adelina Stehle, operatic soprano (born 1860)
- December 30 – France Ačko, Slovenian organist and composer (born 1904)
- date unknown
  - Viktor Selyavin, operatic tenor (born 1875)
  - Joseph Fournier de Belleval, operatic baritone and music teacher (born 1892)
