= 1891 in music =

Events in the year 1891 in music.

== Specific locations ==
- 1891 in Scandinavian music

== Events ==
- February 23 – Fourteen-year-old cellist Pablo Casals gives a solo recital in Barcelona.
- March 16 – A performance of the Budapest Opera is interrupted by a spontaneous demonstration in support of musical director Gustav Mahler, at the time in conflict with intendant Géza Zichy and already negotiating for a position elsewhere.
- May 5 – The Music Hall in New York City (which becomes Carnegie Hall) has its grand opening and first public performance, with Peter Ilyich Tchaikovsky guest-conducting his own work.
- May 10 – Danish classical composer Carl Nielsen marries his compatriot, the sculptor Anne Marie Brodersen, in St Mark's English Church, Florence, Italy, the couple having first met on March 2 in Paris.
- June 24 - Pyotr Ilyich Tchaikovsky finished his ballet The Nutcracker
- October 16 – The Chicago Symphony Orchestra gives its inaugural concert.
- The Peabody Mason Concerts are inaugurated with a performance by Ferruccio Busoni.
- The ensemble attached to the Glasgow Choral Union is formally recognised as the Scottish Orchestra, predecessor of the Royal Scottish National Orchestra.
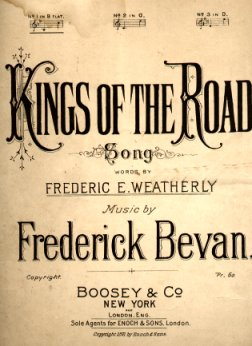

== Published popular music ==
- "Actions Speak Louder Than Words" w. George Horncastle m. Felix McGlennon
- "Don't mind, my Darling!" w.m. Paul Steinmark
- "Hey, Rube!" w. J. Sherrie Matthews m. Harry Bulger
- "High School Cadets March" m. John Philip Sousa
- "Little Boy Blue" w. Eugene Field m. Ethelbert Nevin
- "The Man Who Broke The Bank At Monte Carlo" w.m. Fred Gilbert
- "The Miner's Dream Of Home" w.m. Will Godwin & Leo Dryden
- "Molly O!" w.m. William J. Scanlan
- "Narcissus" m. Ethelbert Nevin
- "The Pardon Came Too Late" w.m. Paul Dresser
- "The Picture That's Turned To The Wall" w.m. Charles Graham
- "Reuben And Cynthia" w.m. Percy Gaunt
- "Ta-ra-ra-boom-de-ay" w.m. Henry J. Sayers
- "Wot Cher! Knocked 'em in the Old Kent Road" w. Albert Chevalier m. Charles Ingle

== Recorded popular music ==
- "Bell Buoy" – J. W. Myers
- "The Church Across The Way" – Len Spencer
- "The Cobbler" – George J. Gaskin
- "College Songs" – Gilmore's Band
- "Cujus Animam" – David B. Dana (cornet) & Edward Issler (piano)
- "Dance of the Owls" – A. T. Van Winkle (Xylophone) & Edward Issler (Piano)
- "Drill, Ye Tarriers, Drill" – George J. Gaskin
- "Farewell to Dresden" – United States Marine Band
- "Five Minutes With The Minstrels" – Voss' First Regiment Band
- "Home, Sweet, Home" – John York AtLee
- "La Media Noche (Mexican Dance)" – United States Marine Band
- "The Laughing Song" – George W. Johnson
- "Little 'Liza Loves You" – Len Spencer
- "Michael Casey as a Physician" – Russell Hunting
- "The Mocking Bird" – John York AtLee and Fred Gaisberg
- "Nannon Waltz" – Issler's Orchestra
- "One Minute Too Late" – Voss' First Regiment Band
- "Paddy's Wedding" – Dan Kelly
- "Pat Brady as a Police Justice" – Dan Kelly
- "Pat Brady on a Spree" – Dan Kelly
- "The Picture Turned to the Wall" – George J. Gaskin
- "The Picture Turned to the Wall" – Manhansett Quartette
- "Rocked in the Cradle of the Deep" – Holding's Parlor Orchestra
- "Sally in Our Alley" – Manhansett Quartette'
- "Saving Them All for Mary" – Al Reeves
- "Sweet Marie" – George J. Gaskin
- "Third verse of Mary & John, The Lover's Quarrel" – Will White
- "Turkey in the Straw" – Billy Golden
- "Uncle Jefferson – Billy Golden
- "Vienna Dudes March" – Duffy and Imgrund's Fifth Regiment Band

== Classical music ==
- Anton Arensky – Cantata on the 10th Anniversary of the Coronation
- Claude Debussy – Two Arabesques
- Johannes Brahms – Clarinet Quintet in B Minor, Op. 115
- Max Bruch – Concerto for Violin No. 3
- Heinrich von Herzogenberg – Requiem, Op. 72
- Carl Nielsen – Fantasy Pieces for Oboe and Piano
- Ethelbert Nevin – Water Scenes
- Camille Saint-Saëns – Africa, Op. 89
- Erik Satie – 6 Gnossiennes for piano
- Alphons Czibulka – Wintermärchen Waltzes Op. 366 (source of Hearts and Flowers)

== Opera ==
- Frederick Delius – Irmelin
- Robert Fuchs – Die Teufelsglocke
- Miguel Marqués – El monaguillo (libretto by Emilio Sánchez Pastor, premiered in Madrid)
- Pietro Mascagni – L'amico Fritz
- Emile Pessard – Les folies amoureuses premiered on April 15 at the Théâtre de l'Opéra-Comique, Paris

== Musical theater ==
- Robin Hood, Broadway production
- The Tyrolean, Broadway production
- Der Vogelhändler (The Tyrolean), Vienna production

== Births ==
- January 25 – Wellman Braud, jazz musician (died 1966)
- February 5 – Dino Borgioli, operatic tenor (died 1960)
- March 22 – Alexis Roland-Manuel, French composer and critic (died 1966)
- March 28 – Leah Frances Russell, Australian opera singer (died 1983)
- April 2 – Jack Buchanan, Scottish singer, actor, dancer and director (died 1957)
- April 15 – Väinö Raitio, Finnish composer (died 1945)
- April 23 – Sergei Prokofiev, Russian composer (died 1953)
- May 16 – Richard Tauber, Austrian singer (died 1948)
- May 26 – Mamie Smith, blues singer (died 1946)
- May 30 – Ben Bernie, US bandleader (died 1943)
- June 3 – Georges Guibourg, French singer, actor and writer (died 1970)
- June 9 – Cole Porter, songwriter (died 1964)
- June 10 – Al Dubin, Swiss-born American lyricist (died 1945)
- June 21 – Hermann Scherchen, German conductor (died 1966)
- July 14 – Fréhel, French singer and actress (died 1951)
- July 16 – Blossom Seeley, US singer and vaudeville performer (died 1974)
- August 2 – Arthur Bliss, composer (died 1975)
- September 11 – Noël Gallon, French composer and music educator (died 1966)
- September 14 – Czesław Marek, Polish composer, pianist, and piano teacher (died 1985)
- September 16 – Milton Schwarzwald, American film director and composer (died 1950)
- September 26 – Charles Munch, Alsatian symphonic conductor and violinist (died 1968)
- October 1 – Morfydd Llwyn Owen, Welsh singer and composer (died 1918)
- October 29 – Fanny Brice, US actress, comedian and singer (died 1951)
- November 27 – Giovanni Breviario, operatic tenor (died 1982)
- date unknown
  - Charles McCarron, composer and lyricist (died 1919)
  - Margaret Morris, dancer and choreographer (died 1980)

== Deaths ==
- January 5 – Emma Abbott, singer (born 1850)
- January 8 – Fredrik Pacius, composer and conductor (born 1809)
- January 17 – Johannes Verhulst, conductor and composer (born 1816)
- January 16 – Léo Delibes, composer (born 1836)
- January 21 – Calixa Lavallée, composer (born 1842)
- May 23 – Ignace Leybach, pianist, organist and composer (born 1817)
- June 14 – Count Nicolò Gabrielli, Italian opera composer (born 1814
- July 3 – Stefano Golinelli, pianist and composer (born 1818)
- July 21 – Franco Faccio, composer and conductor (born 1840)
- August 5/6 – Henry Litolff, keyboard virtuoso and composer (born 1818)
- September 2 – Ferdinand Praeger, composer, music teacher, pianist and writer (b. 1815)
- October 27
  - Charles Constantin, conductor (born 1835)
  - Johann Dubez, Viennese violinist and composer (born 1828)
- November 9 – Frederick Mathushek, piano maker (born 1814)
- November 20 – Franz Hitz, Swiss pianist and composer (born 1828)
- December 28 – Alfred Cellier, composer (born 1844)
- date unknown
  - Harvey B. Dodworth, bandmaster and conductor (born 1822)
  - Fanny Salvini-Donatelli, operatic soprano (born c.1815)
