= Fantasia on Auld Lang Syne =

Set of musical variations for orchestra or two pianos

The Fantasia on Auld Lang Syne is a piece for orchestra composed by the British light music composer Ernest Tomlinson in 1976. The original version was written for 16 saxophones. It was orchestrated in 1977 and there were later arrangements made for concert band and for "two pianos and two turnovers".

The first version was commissioned by instrument maker Buffet Crampon as the finale for the 5th World Saxophone Congress, held at the Royal College of Music in July 1976. Tomlinson scored it for 16 saxophones in three groups: the (classical) London Saxophone Quartet; the (jazz) Peter Hughes Saxophone Quintet; and a third group including one each of the complete members of the saxophone family, from sopranino to contrabass. The first full orchestral performance was in March 1977 at the Palace Theatre in Manchester. It was first broadcast by BBC Radio on 4 January 1982 with the BBC Concert Orchestra conducted by Ashley Lawrence.

The piece, lasting around 20 minutes, is a set of variations on Auld Lang Syne in the form of a quodlibet – a musical composition that combines several different melodies, usually popular tunes, in counterpoint, often in a light-hearted, humorous manner. The composer conceived it as an answer to Elgar's Enigma Variations, in which the original theme is never stated. Here Tomlinson introduces at least 129 well-known tunes, often overlapping, taken from classical and folk sources. Auld Lang Syne is always present as a counter melody.

According to Tomlinson "it is a well known fact" that Elgar used Auld Lang Syne as the basis for the hidden theme of the Enigma Variations. "What is not generally known", continues Tomlinson "is that all other sets of important variations were also based on this song. Indeed, all the greatest tunes in musical history are based on Auld Lang Syne".

Morag Grant has pointed out that, hidden among extremely famous melodies such as the Toreador theme from Bizet's Carmen, Beethoven's Ode to Joy and the carol Good King Wenceslas, the piece also includes a 12-tone variation "in distinctly Webernian style". Elgar's theme appears at rehearsal number 8 in the full score, set against Auld Lang Syne in the minor key. The conductor Gavin Sutherland has called it "a work of contrapuntal genius".

== Themes quoted ==
- Old Folks at Home by Stephen Foster
- "Gloire immortelle de nos aïeux" from Faust by Charles Gounod
- Prince of Denmark's March by Jeremiah Clarke
- The British Grenadiers
- Men of Harlech
- Go In and Out the Window
- Overture to William Tell by Gioacchino Rossini
- Rakes of Mallow
- She’ll Be Coming Around the Mountain
- The Irish Washerwoman
- Symphonic Variations by César Franck
- Third Movement (Funeral March) from Piano Sonata No. 2 in B♭ minor by Frédéric Chopin
- Main theme from Enigma Variations by Edward Elgar
- Ode to Joy from Symphony No. 9 in D minor Choral by Ludwig van Beethoven
- Fourth movement from Divertimento in B♭ major, Hob.II:46 by Joseph Haydn
- Rondeau from Abdelazer By Henry Purcell or The Young Person's Guide to the Orchestra by Benjamin Britten
- Caprice No. 24 by Niccolo Paganini
- Fourth movement from Trout Quintet by Franz Schubert
- Impromptus, Op. 142, No. 3 by Schubert
- Second movement from Symphony No. 94 in G major Surprise by Haydn
- Jesu, Joy of Man's Desiring from Herz und Mund und Tat und Leben, BWV 147 by Johann Sebastian Bach
- Londonderry Air or Danny Boy
- La golondrina by Narciso Serradell Sevilla
- Humoresques No. 7 by Antonin Dvořák
- Beautiful Dreamer by Foster
- Third movement from Symphony No. 6 in B minor Pathetique by Pyotr Ilyich Tchaikovsky
- A Life on the Ocean Wave by Henry Russell
- Victory at Sea by Richard Rodgers
- Adagio from Spartacus by Aram Khachaturian
- The Hebrides Overture by Felix Mendelssohn
- Wintermärchen/Hearts and Flowers by Alphons Czibulka and Theodore Moses Tobani
- First movement from Piano Sonata No. 16 in C major by Wolfgang Amadeus Mozart
- Arrival of the Queen Sheba from Solomon by George Frideric Handel
- Over the Hills and Far Away
- "Danse des petits cygnes" from Swan Lake by Tchaikovsky
- Fugue in C minor, BWV 847 from The Well-Tempered Clavier by Bach
- The Keel Row
- Phil the Fluter's Ball by Percy French
- Overture to Carmen by Georges Bizet
- Tom, Tom, the Piper's Son
- This Old Man
- Rule, Britannia! by Thomas Arne
- The Floral Dance by Katie Moss
- Frühlingsstimmen by Johann Strauss Jr.
- Les Patineurs by Emile Waldteufel
- Kaiser-Walzer by Strauss II
- Künstlerleben by Strauss II
- Home on the Range by Daniel E. Kelley
- "Waltz to Act 1 from Swan Lake by Tchaikovsky
- Morgenblätter by Strauss II
- Wein, Weib und Gesang by Strauss II
- Valses Sentimentales Op. 50 No. 13 by Schubert
- Invitation to the Dance by Carl Maria von Weber
- "Je veux vivre" from Roméo et Juliette by Gounod
- "Il Bacio" by Luigi Arditi
- "Brüderlein, Brüderlein und Schwesterlein" from Die Fledermaus by Strauss II
- Tales from the Vienna Woods by Strauss II
- Dolores by Waldteufel
- Waves of the Danube by Iosif Ivanovici
- Waltz in B minor, Op. 69, No. 2 by Chopin
- Grande valse brilliante in E♭ major by Chopin
- The Blue Danube by Strauss II
- The Ash Grove
- Oranges and Lemons
- Mazurkas, Op. 7 No. 1 in B♭ major by Chopin
- Mazurkas from Coppélia by Léo Delibes
- Second Movement from Serenade for Strings by Tchaikovsky
- Dance of the Comedians from The Bartered Bride by Bedrich Smetana
- Slavonic Dances Op. 46 No. 3 by Dvǒrak
- Hungarian Dances No. 6 by Johannes Brahms
- Overture to Light Cavalry by Franz von Suppé
- For He's a Jolly Good Fellow
- Romeo and Juliet by Tchaikovsky
- Perpetuum Mobile by Strauss II
- Third Movement from Horn Concerto No. 4 in E♭ major by Mozart
- "Gavotte" from Mignon by Ambroise Thomas
- Girls and Boys Come Out To Play
- Slavonic Dances Op. 46 No. 2 by Dvǒrak
- The Hundred Pipers
- Overture to Rosamunde by Schubert
- "Galop infernal" from Orpheus in the Underworld by Jacques Offenbach
- Military March No. 1 in D major from Three Marche Militaire by Schubert
- Hungarian Dances No. 5 by Brahms
- Danse de Phrynes from Faust by Gounod
- La Danza from Les soirées musicales by Rossini
- Pizzicato from Sylvia by Delibes
- Overture to La Vie parisienne by Offenbach
- Hungarian Rhapsody No 2 by Franz Liszt
- Mysterioso Pizzicato by J. Bodewalt Lampe
- BACH motif
- "Ricercare a 6" from The Musical Offering by Bach
- Dark Eyes by Florian Hermann
- Post Horn Galop by Hermann Koenig
- Overture to Semiramide by Rossini
- Jamaican Rumba by Arthur Benjamin
- Sabre Dance from Gayane by Khachaturian
- Overture to The Barber of Seville by Rossini
- Overture to Ruslan and Lyudmila by Mikhail Glinka
- Goodnight, Ladies by Edwin Pearce Christy
- Comin' Thro' the Rye
- Waltzing Matilda by Christina Macpherson
- Peter, Peter, Pumpkin Eater
- Farandole from L'Arlésienne Suite No. 2 by Bizet
- 1812 Overture by Tchaikovsky
- Cuckoo’s Call
- Westminster Quarters by Joseph Jowett, John Randall or William Crotch
- O Come, All Ye Faithful by John Francis Wade
- Jarabe Tapatio by Jesús González Rubio
- "Non più andrai" from The Marriage of Figaro by Mozart
- "Largo al factotum" from The Barber of Seville by Rossini
- Here We Go Around the Mulberry Bush
- La Cucaracha
- "Spring Song" from Songs Without Words by Mendelssohn
- La donna è mobile from Rigoletto by Giuseppe Verdi
- The Girl I Left Behind
- First movement from Symphony No. 4 in A major Italian by Mendelssohn
- Yankee Doodle
- "Questa o quella" from Rigoletto by Verdi
- "Poor wand'ring one" from The Pirates of Penzance by Arthur Sullivan
- Good King Wenceslas
- The Sailor's Hornpipe
- First movement from Symphony No. 5 in C minor Fate by Beethoven
- Fourth Movement from Symphony no. 9 in E minor From the New World by Dvořák
