= List of Billboard number-one R&B songs of 1945 =

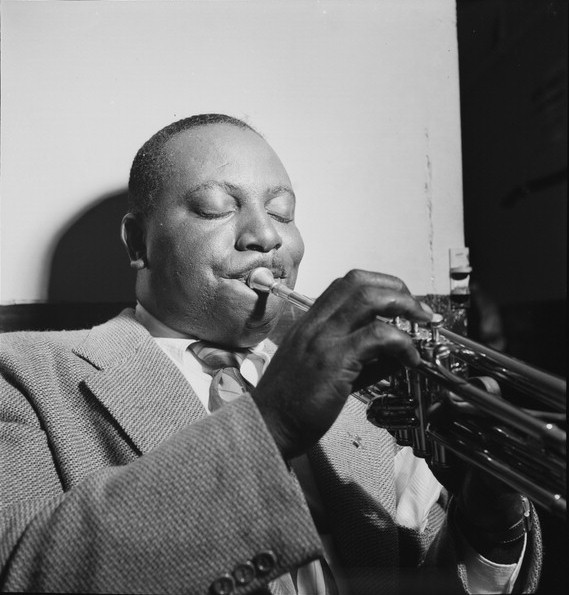
Cootie Williams topped the final Harlem Hit Parade chart with "Somebody's Gotta Go".

At the start of 1945, Billboard magazine published a chart ranking the "most popular records in Harlem" under the title of the Harlem Hit Parade. Placings were based on a survey of record stores primarily in the Harlem district of New York City, an area which has historically been noted for its African American population and called the "black capital of America". This chart was published for the final time in the issue dated February 10. The following week the magazine launched a new chart in its place, Most Played Juke Box Race Records, based not on retail sales but on the number of times songs had been played in jukeboxes, although records' peak positions and numbers of weeks on chart were carried over; "race records" was a term then in common usage for recordings by black artists. The two charts are considered part of the lineage of the magazine's multimetric R&B chart, which since 2005 has been published under the title Hot R&B/Hip Hop Songs.

In the issue of Billboard dated January 6, the Ink Spots and Ella Fitzgerald topped the Harlem Hit Parade with "Into Each Life Some Rain Must Fall", retaining the top spot from the previous week. The song remained at number one through the issue dated February 3 for a final total of 11 weeks atop the chart. It was displaced by "Somebody's Gotta Go" by Cootie Williams and his Orchestra on the final chart published under the Harlem Hit Parade title. It was the first number one for Williams but would prove to be the final charting song of his career. The following week, Pvt. Cecil Gant topped the first Most Played Juke Box Race Records listing with "I Wonder". Gant spent two weeks at number one before being displaced by Roosevelt Sykes with his recording of the same song. Both versions would be the only number one for their respective artists.

The only act with more than one number one in 1945 was Louis Jordan and his Tympany Five, who spent a single week atop the chart with "Mop! Mop!" in April and six weeks in the top spot with "Caldonia" beginning in June. Having first reached number one in 1943, Jordan was by far the most successful artist of the 1940s on Billboard's R&B charts. His tally of 18 chart-toppers was a record which would stand until the 1980s, and he spent 113 weeks at number one,^{[a]} a record which would still stand in the 21st century. Jordan's success fell away in the 1950s, but his music is considered to have been hugely influential on the development of both R&B and rock and roll. In the issue of Billboard dated September 8, Joe Liggins and his Honeydrippers reached number one with "The Honeydripper" (Parts 1 & 2), which remained atop the chart for the rest of the year. The track would spend one further week in the top spot in 1946 for a final total of 18 weeks at number one, a record for an R&B chart-topper which would be equalled by Louis Jordan in 1946 and Drake in 2016 but not broken until "Old Town Road" by Lil Nas X spent a 19th week atop the modern Hot R&B/Hip Hop Songs chart in 2019.

== Chart history ==
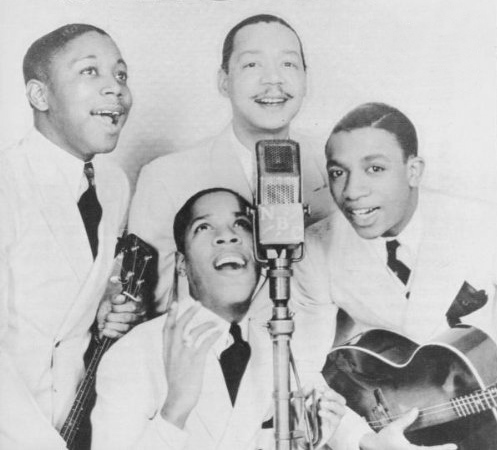
The Ink Spots were at number one at the start of the year.

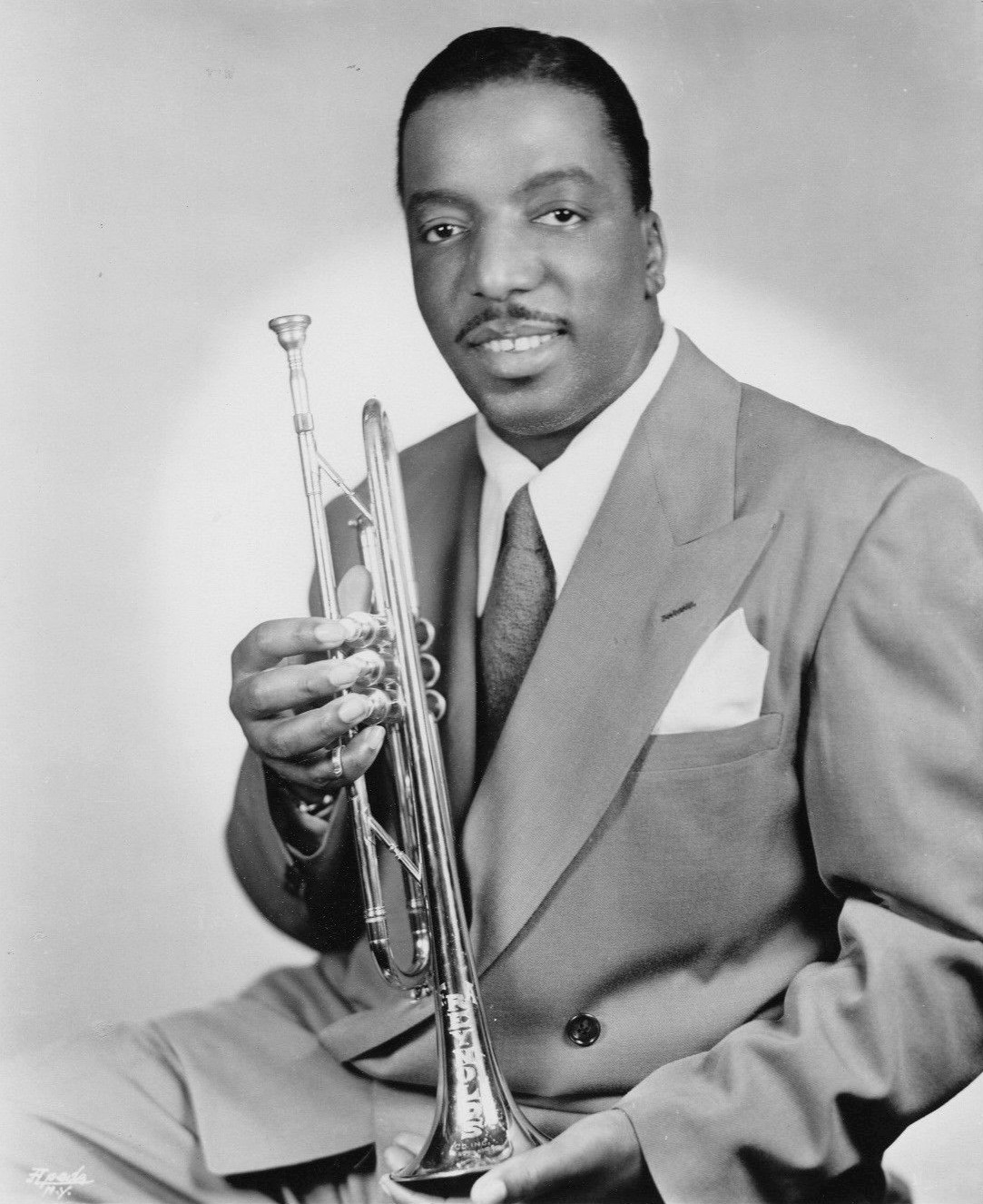
Erskine Hawkins and his Orchestra reached number one with "Tippin' In".

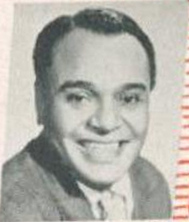
Lucky Millinder and his Orchestra spent eight weeks at number one with "Who Threw the Whiskey in the Well".

=== Harlem Hit Parade ===
Harlem Hit Parade chart
Issue date	Title	Artist(s)	Ref.
January 6	"Into Each Life Some Rain Must Fall"	The Ink Spots and Ella Fitzgerald	
January 13	"Into Each Life Some Rain Must Fall"	The Ink Spots and Ella Fitzgerald	
January 20	"Into Each Life Some Rain Must Fall"	The Ink Spots and Ella Fitzgerald	
January 27	"Into Each Life Some Rain Must Fall"	The Ink Spots and Ella Fitzgerald	
February 3	"Into Each Life Some Rain Must Fall"	The Ink Spots and Ella Fitzgerald	
February 10	"Somebody's Gotta Go"	Cootie Williams and his Orchestra	

=== Most Played Juke Box Race Records ===
Most Played Juke Box Race Records chart
Issue date	Title	Artist(s)	Ref.
February 17	"I Wonder"	Pvt. Cecil Gant	
February 24	"I Wonder"	Pvt. Cecil Gant	
March 3	"I Wonder"	Roosevelt Sykes	
March 10	"I Wonder"	Roosevelt Sykes	
March 17	"I Wonder"	Roosevelt Sykes	
March 24	"I Wonder"	Roosevelt Sykes	
March 31	"I Wonder"	Roosevelt Sykes	
April 7	"I Wonder"	Roosevelt Sykes	
April 14	"Tippin' In"	Erskine Hawkins and his Orchestra	
April 21	"Mop! Mop!"	Louis Jordan and his Tympany Five	
April 28	"Tippin' In"	Erskine Hawkins and his Orchestra	
May 5	"Tippin' In"	Erskine Hawkins and his Orchestra	
May 12	"Tippin' In"	Erskine Hawkins and his Orchestra	
May 19	"Tippin' In"	Erskine Hawkins and his Orchestra	
May 26	"Tippin' In"	Erskine Hawkins and his Orchestra	
June 2	"Caldonia"	Louis Jordan and his Tympany Five	
June 9	"Caldonia"	Louis Jordan and his Tympany Five	
June 16	"Caldonia"	Louis Jordan and his Tympany Five	
June 23	"Caldonia"	Louis Jordan and his Tympany Five	
June 30	"Caldonia"	Louis Jordan and his Tympany Five	
July 7	"Caldonia"	Louis Jordan and his Tympany Five	
July 14	"Who Threw the Whiskey in the Well"	Lucky Millinder and his Orchestra	
July 21	"Who Threw the Whiskey in the Well"	Lucky Millinder and his Orchestra	
July 28	"Who Threw the Whiskey in the Well"	Lucky Millinder and his Orchestra	
August 4	"Who Threw the Whiskey in the Well"	Lucky Millinder and his Orchestra	
August 11	"Who Threw the Whiskey in the Well"	Lucky Millinder and his Orchestra	
August 18	"Who Threw the Whiskey in the Well"	Lucky Millinder and his Orchestra	
August 25	"Who Threw the Whiskey in the Well"	Lucky Millinder and his Orchestra	
September 1	"Who Threw the Whiskey in the Well"	Lucky Millinder and his Orchestra	
September 8	"The Honeydripper" (Parts 1 & 2)	Joe Liggins and his Honeydrippers	
September 15	"The Honeydripper" (Parts 1 & 2)	Joe Liggins and his Honeydrippers	
September 22	"The Honeydripper" (Parts 1 & 2)	Joe Liggins and his Honeydrippers	
September 29	"The Honeydripper" (Parts 1 & 2)	Joe Liggins and his Honeydrippers	
October 6	"The Honeydripper" (Parts 1 & 2)	Joe Liggins and his Honeydrippers	
October 13	"The Honeydripper" (Parts 1 & 2)	Joe Liggins and his Honeydrippers	
October 20	"The Honeydripper" (Parts 1 & 2)	Joe Liggins and his Honeydrippers	
October 27	"The Honeydripper" (Parts 1 & 2)	Joe Liggins and his Honeydrippers	
November 3	"The Honeydripper" (Parts 1 & 2)	Joe Liggins and his Honeydrippers	
November 10	"The Honeydripper" (Parts 1 & 2)	Joe Liggins and his Honeydrippers	
November 17	"The Honeydripper" (Parts 1 & 2)	Joe Liggins and his Honeydrippers	
November 24	"The Honeydripper" (Parts 1 & 2)	Joe Liggins and his Honeydrippers	
December 1	"The Honeydripper" (Parts 1 & 2)	Joe Liggins and his Honeydrippers	
December 8	"The Honeydripper" (Parts 1 & 2)	Joe Liggins and his Honeydrippers	
December 15	"The Honeydripper" (Parts 1 & 2)	Joe Liggins and his Honeydrippers	
December 22	"The Honeydripper" (Parts 1 & 2)	Joe Liggins and his Honeydrippers	
December 29	"The Honeydripper" (Parts 1 & 2)	Joe Liggins and his Honeydrippers	

== Notes ==
a. Jordan's first 16 number ones occurred at a time when Billboard published only one R&B chart. His final two number ones occurred during a period when the magazine published two charts and each topped both listings, but the figure of 113 weeks at number one does not double-count weeks when he topped both.
