= Aldo Finzi =

Aldo Finzi may refer to:

- Aldo Finzi (composer) (1897–1945), Italian classical music composer
- Aldo Finzi (politician) (1891–1944), Italian politician
