= The Big Story (American TV series) =

American TV dramatic anthology series (1949–1957)

The Big Story is an American dramatic anthology television series that presented stories about courageous journalists. It was broadcast on NBC from September 16, 1949, to June 28, 1957, and it was syndicated thereafter. By the beginning of the 1956-1957 season, the program had honored reporters from 236 newspapers in 170 cities. Its integration of film with live elements "created and pioneered a 'realism' concept in television production".

== Overview ==
Bob Sloane was the initial host of The Big Story. Subsequent hosts were Norman Rose, Ben Grauer, and Burgess Meredith. The program was "a separate television show" from the radio series of the same name, which was created by Bernard J. Prockter. Some stories from the radio series were adapted for the TV program. Others were deemed unsuitable for adapting to TV. Prockter cited as an example a story about a mother who was killed with an axe by her two children. "NBC was a little apprehensive, of course, but it made a good show" on radio, he said; "We couldn't use it on our television production, however."

Using a "documentary-drama" format, episodes related real-life stories about newspaper reporters whose work had "solved crimes, uncovered corruption, or otherwise performed significant public service through their diligent reporting". Topics of the stories presented ranged from scandals at the national level to human-interest reporting in a locality. Episodes were presented live, incorporating segments that were filmed on location of the event being covered. Actors portrayed the reporters and other people features in episodes after a few early attempts to have reporters appear as themselves were unsuccessful. The reporter whose work was featured in each episode received a $500 award from the sponsor, the American Tobacco Company.

When Grauer joined the program in the fall of 1955, he was presented as the "Big Story editor". Other changes that season included integrating more film with the live portion of the show and having the honored reporter present appear on the broadcast.

== Actors and reporters ==
Actors who appeared on the series included:

- Donald Briggs
- Frank Campanella
- Robert Carroll
- Robert Culp
- Roger De Koven
- Russell Hardie
- Vinton Hayworth
- Eileen Heckart
- Adelaide Klein
- Joe Mantell
- Lori March
- Frank Marth
- Paul McGrath
- Terry O'Sullivan
- Leo Penn
- George Petrie
- Nat Polen
- Lee Richardson
- Herbert Rudley
- Arthur Storch
- Lesley Woods

Reporters whose work was featured included Victor Riesel, Walter Winchell, and Celestine Sibley.

== Production ==
The American Tobacco Company's commercials promoted Pall Mall cigarettes. The program was broadcast on Fridays at 9:30 p.m. Eastern Time. It initially alternated with Lights Out. In late October 1949, Ripley's Believe It or Not became the alternating program. Beginning January 13, 1950, it was seen on alternate weeks with Life Begins at Eighty. Its competition included Magnavox Theatre on CBS and Pulitzer Prize Playhouse on ABC. At some point, Vick Chemical became a sponsor. That relationship ended effective March 26, 1957, when Ralston-Purina replaced Vick as sponsor.

Prockter Television Enterprises produced the program, with Bernard J. Prockter as the producer. Directors included David Rich, Charles Skinner, and Al Scott. Writers included Arnold Perl and Sloane. The series originated from WNBT. NBC's eastern network carried episodes live, while kinescopes were used on the west coast. By the beginning of the 1955-1956 season, Everett Rosenthal had bought Big Story from Prockter and was the show's executive producer; Robert Lewis Shayon was the producer.

The program's research staff read about 100 newspapers each week in search of reporting activity that might be developed into episodes. Possible topics that emerged from that process were checked to verify facts. A seven-person crew went to cities to film on locations where events in stories took place, a means of ensuring background authenticity in episodes. Development of an episode from acceptance of a story to broadcasting typically took about six months, with much of the time used for research. Three months typically elapsed between on-location filming and the broadcast of an episode. Because of that time lag, Prockter had the leading actor in each episode insured for $5,000 to minimize any loss that might result if the actor were unable to appear on the live broadcast.

=== Live with film ===
Broadcasts of The Big Story were presented live, but they included content filmed at sites related to the stories. That combination enabled the inclusion of "on the spot" segments that were integral to the radio version. Mixing the two was deemed essential. Using all-film episodes would have meant increased production costs (estimated at $20,000 per week, more than twice the weekly cost of an all-live program), but limitations of an all-live production would have undermined the show's realistic approach. A modified station wagon with camera platforms on its front, roof, and tailgate was used for filming on location. Special portable lights provided illumination. The cameraman and the people who processed the film coordinated efforts to produce film with a quality such that viewers would not be able to tell which parts of an episode were live and which were filmed. That approach involved "integrating and matching cuts, even closeups, from film to live or live to film, often right in the middle of a dialogue sequence." The hybrid technique created a documentary effect, which added authenticity to the stories. The trade publication Variety said that the technique was "skillfully done; at times it's hard to distinguish between the live and the film on the show". The portion of episodes' content that was filmed ranged from 5 percent to 50 percent, with the average approximately 25 percent. By March 1955 Prockter estimated that 750,000 feet of film had been shot for the show.

=== End of network run ===
In its May 22, 1957, issue, Variety reported that the show's sponsors decided to cancel it, effective at the end of the season. However, a story in the following week's issue said that while American Tobacco was "firm on dropping" Big Story and had already committed to sponsoring a replacement series, Ralston-Purina reportedly wanted to keep the show on the air. Toward that end it was looking for another time slot for the series. After the series shifted to syndication, a group of journalists expressed appreciation for the show in the form of a scroll signed by many of the 600 people who were recipients of its weekly recognition. Additionally, a committee of newspaper people were collecting "mementos, exhibits and files relating to stories highlighted in the series" with plans to display those items either at Pyramid's headquarters or at schools of journalism in universities.

== Critical response ==
Stan Anderson, writing in the Cleveland Press, contrasted the program's approach to journalism with that of two celebrity reporters of that era. After writing about Frank Shenkel, whose work had been featured on The Big Story, he concluded,

I thought of Shenkel last night, when Walter Winchell was telling millions how thrilled he has been to bring them "exclusives" over many years. And following Winchell was Louella arsons, who for some reason got almost hysterical over her "exclusives". She giggled and giggled. Although Big Story does get melodramatic most of the time, it does have this advantage — it gives credit to the Shenkels. The Winchells and the Parsonses manage to give credit to themselves.

Media critic John Crosby commented on The Big Story's efforts to achieve realism: "The dialog and acting are lean, terse, and convincing." He added that Prockter tried to find actors who resembled the reporters in featured stories and noted that the development of stories and representation of news staffs seemed realistic, "a refreshing change from the hyped-up city room atmosphere in most movies". The only fault Crosby cited on the show was that it focused too much on "the more spectacular aspects of journalism, chiefly murder stories" while overlooking reporters' investigations of "gentler forms of skullduggery".

John Lester wrote in the Staten Island Advance that episodes consistently presented "an interesting, engrossing and, occasionally, amazing half-hour of TV entertainment", and he praised the quality of production and adaptation of stories.

The trade publication Variety, in a review of the fourth-season debut episode in 1952, said that it had "gripping viewing all the way", strengthened by the writing and acting. Leo Penn was cited for "a fine bit of under-playing as the reporter", and the review pointed out the good work in production, narration, and background music.

A review of the fall 1955 premiere episode in The New York Times said that the show's revised format "achieved an effective sense of realism that managed to avoid the hysteria of a potboiler and the static understatement of the parvenu police shows." The review complimented the direction and writing. Variety, however, said in a review of that episode, "[T]he added elements seem superfluous and forced, and moreover, Grauer seems somewhat uncomfortable in his role". As for the episode itself, the review said that the story was no better than ordinary crime stories on TV. The newspaper photographer who was the subject of the episode had been present at a killing and subsequently identified the killer and testified in court; otherwise he had no connection to the story.

Ellis Walker, in a column in the Redwood City Tribune criticized The Big Story for inaccurate promotion with regard to a 1957 episode. Walker wrote, "Billed as an exploration of 'The James Dean Legend', it promised to examine the strange phenomenon of this young actor's posthumous popularity." Grauer, he added, "opened the show with a similar promise". Walker's disappointment came when the episode turned out to be a rerun of a two-year-old episode of the program supplemented by a one-sentence comment from a reporter about how teenagers identified with Dean's rebellious attitude. Walker described the approach as "a flimsy excuse for repeating an old program" and added, "I'll never believe a Big Story promise again."

== Controversies ==
A 1954 episode that related how an reporter in Albany, New York, participated in the arrest of a gunman, perhaps saving the policeman's life in the process, turned out to be inaccurate. After the broadcast, The Schenectady Union-Star newspaper published a story in which the policeman who made the arrest said that no newspaperman was present at that time and that his life was never in danger from the suspect, who was unarmed and surrendered with no resistance. A spokesman for company that produced the program acknowledged that the arrest scene had been erroneously depicted while pointing out that the reporter "substantially aided the police" otherwise.

=== Lawsuits ===
A man who was the subject of a 1952 Big Story episode sued NBC in federal court in Washington, D. C., in February 1955. The suit dealt with a 1952 broadcast about Charles S. Bernstein's conviction and death sentence on a charge of first-degree murder in 1933. His sentence was commuted to life imprisonment in 1935, and in 1945 he was given a Presidential pardon. The episode in question was presented as a reporter's efforts to save a convicted man's life. The broadcast used the name David Crouch in place of Bernstein's real name and changed the name of the place where he lived. Nevertheless, Bernstein's attorneys said that people in Virginia and the District of Columbia were able to identify Bernstein as a result of the broadcast. The suit said that the program caused people to shun Bernstein even though he had led an "exemplary" life. The attorneys described "public condemnation" to which he had been subjected, including being called "a murderer" and "a murdering S.O.B." As a result, they said, Bernstein suffered from depression and had become "quite emotionally disturbed", and he had nightmares about his two years in the prison's death house and its electric chair.

Bernstein's attorneys said that he had "a common law right of privacy" and that the use of a fictitious name did not provide sufficient protection. NBC's attorneys said that because all names in the episode were fictitious except for the reporter's name, only viewers who already knew of Bernstein's involvement in the case should have been able to recognize him. Additionally, they said, NBC should not be held liable because an independent contractor provided the program. In March 1955 the judge ruled that the broadcast did not violate Bernstein's privacy. The ruling said that NBC was not liable for damages because a "formerly public" person had no protection against publication of facts "in a reasonable manner and for a legitimate purpose". That decision was upheld by a three-judge panel of the United States Court of Appeals in March 1956. The panel noted that the episode did not use Bernstein's name and that its only derogatory content had already appeared in media or in court records. Therefore, it ruled that his privacy had not been violated by the broadcast.

Another court case in 1955 had a convicted bank robber suing American Tobacco Company, saying that a Big Story broadcast "exploited" him for the company's gain. William Roy Miller was serving a 15-year sentence for a 1951 bank robbery to which he pleaded guilty. He said that he had repented and become a model prisoner, but the broadcast tended to discredit him.

== Syndication ==
In July 1957 plans for syndication of The Big Story were announced, following the end of the show's run on NBC. Filming of episodes in New York incorporated segments filmed at each episode's location. Meredith continued as the host, while Pyramid Productions, Incorporated, and executive producer Everett Rosenthal were in charge of the filming. Official Films, Incorporated, handled the distribution. Pyramid officials planned to re-use existing stories from the series, keeping some of the on-site filmed segments from the original episodes while filming the rest of each episode anew with an updated script. Robert Lewis Shayon was the producer, and Stuart Rosenberg was the director. The first season's production budget was $1.5 million for 39 episodes in black-and-white. By mid-July 1957, deals with WABD in New York, WTTG in Washington, and KTLA in Los Angeles brought in $250,000 toward that cost.

Flamingo Telefilm Sales obtained the distribution rights from Official Films in October 1958, but by April 1959 Official Films had resumed distribution of the series.

=== Critical response ===
A Variety review of an early syndicated episode ("Hostage") found problems with the writing, production, and directing. The review said that the script contained "long, rambling speeches" to the extent that the episode's pace reached "the point of boredom". The review compared the production quality to an earlier era of TV when budgets were tighter and filming was improvised, and it pointed out the director's responsibility for allowing some excessive acting and "rambling story-telling".

== Magazine ==
The Big Story, a monthly magazine based on the radio and TV series of the same name, debuted in August 1951. The digest-sized publication contained six "authentic stories reported in the press" in each 130-page issue. It sold for 25 cents and was promoted at the end of the program's episodes.
