= Alois Burgstaller =

German operatic singer

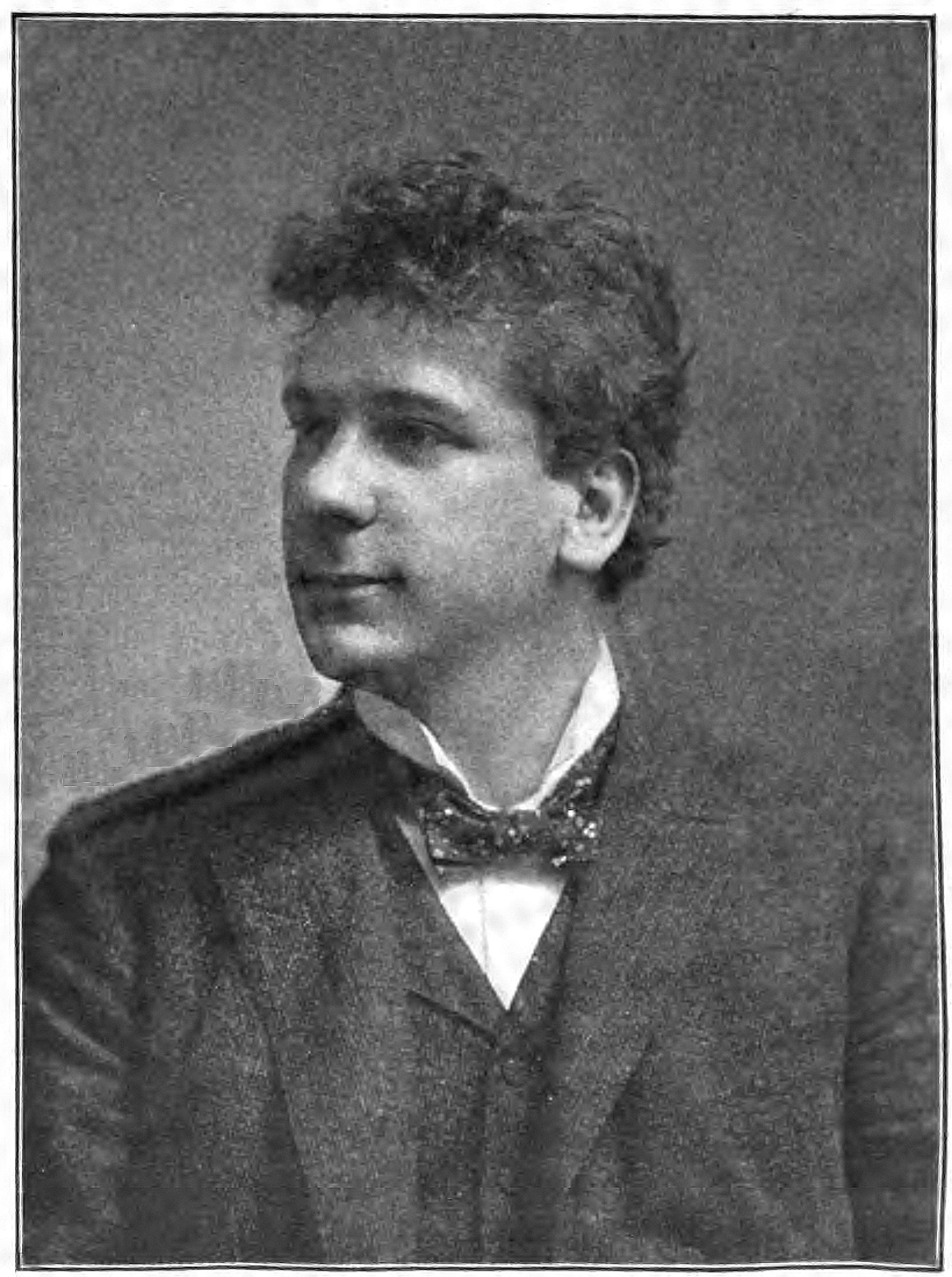
- Burgstaller c. 1896
- Born: Alois Burgstaller; 21 September 1872; Holzkirchen, Upper Bavaria, Germany
- Died: 19 April 1945 (aged 72)
- Occupation: Opera singer (tenor)

Alois Burgstaller (21 September 1872 – 19 April 1945) was a German operatic tenor.

== Early life, family and education/training ==
Burgstaller was born in Holzkirchen, Upper Bavaria, Germany. A trained watchmaker, he always loved to sing and his vocal talent was discovered during an amateur theatre performance in church.

Burgstaller became a serious student of opera music and was a favorite pupil of Cosima Wagner, the widow of composer Richard Wagner (and daughter of composer Franz Liszt), who encouraged to sing professionally. He took lessons in Frankfurt and at the Bayreuth School under Julius Kniese.

== Career ==
Burgstaller made his stage debut in 1894 at the Bayreuth Festival in a small part. Subsequently sung the major Wagnerian roles of Siegfried, Siegmund, Erik, and Parsifal at Bayreuth from 1896 to 1903. He also performed these roles at other leading European opera houses, including those in such important cities as Paris, Zurich, Budapest, London, Amsterdam, and Moscow.

He made his American debut at the Metropolitan Opera, New York City, as Siegmund in Die Walküre on February 12, 1903. He appeared throughout the US, singing in San Francisco, Boston, Philadelphia, Chicago, Pittsburgh, and Los Angeles during the next six or so years. His final performance, as Siegmund, occurred on January 14, 1909.

On Christmas Eve, 1903, he had sung the title role in the first staged American performance of Richard Wagner's Parsifal in New York City. This performance was in violation of German copyright law and angered Cosima Wagner, who was trying to keep productions of the work exclusive to Bayreuth. As a result, Alois, as well as the baritone singer Anton van Rooy and conductor Alfred Hertz, were banned from any further performances at Bayreuth. When his American career began winding down, Burgstaller appealed to the Wagner family and was eventually welcomed back to Bayreuth, performing in the festivals of 1908 and 1909.

== Personal life and demise ==
Burgstaller spent his later years in St. Quirin, Gmund am Tegernsee. He died in 1945 at age 72. He was buried at the Holzkirchner cemetery.

The local market municipality and a roadway are named after him.
