= The Mail Story =

The Mail Story, also known as Handle With Care or The Mail Story: Handle With Care, was an American television anthology series that featured stories about the United States Postal Service (USPS). Thirteen thirty-minute-long episodes were broadcast on ABC from October 7, 1954 through December 30, 1954. The program was created with the backing of Arthur Summerfield, 57th Postmaster General of the United States, who appeared on air to introduce the first episode of the program. The series was a docudrama, depicting real historical events faced by members of the postal service from 19th-century stagecoach robberies to 20th-century incidents of mail fraud. The show was produced by Robert L. Shayon.

The opening episode of the series featured Wesley Addy as an Atlanta based physician receiving disturbing poison pen mail from a former patient suffering from mental illness (played by Richard Garth). Mary Alice Moore portrayed the doctor's wife, and Herb Nelson portrayed the USPS investigator.
