= Robert Lewis Shayon =

American writer and producer

- Born: August 15, 1912; Brooklyn, New York, US
- Died: June 28, 2008 (aged 95); Frankfort, Kentucky, US
- Spouse(s): Sheila Russell (?-1983) Nash Cox (m. 1984)

Robert Lewis Shayon (August 15, 1912 – June 28, 2008) was a writer and producer for WOR and for the CBS Radio in New York City. He was also a teacher at the Annenberg School for Communication and the University of Pennsylvania. He also worked as a producer, writer, and director on American television in the 1950s.

== Early years ==
Shayon was born in Brooklyn on August 15, 1912. His mother died in 1918 when he was 6, and his father, who was an insurance salesman, later married a woman who had her own children. By the late 1920s, he was homeless and sleeping on park benches. He took odd jobs in theaters and occasionally he read poetry on the radio. There he met the Australian opera singer Leah Frances Russell (1891–1983), who became his mentor and benefactor. She introduced him to her daughter, Sheila Russell, whom he later married.

== Career ==
Shayon wrote and directed Once Upon a Time, which debuted on the Mutual Broadcasting System on December 10, 1938. The dramatizations of fairy tales were created in collaboration with the Radio Division of the Federal Theatre Project.

Shayon wrote the teleplay Wings Over Barriers which was broadcast on the program Goodyear Television Playhouse in 1953. He was the producer of the 1954 television series The Mail Story. He was the director and producer for the 1957 television series The Big Story. He also worked as a writer in the 1960s for the news program ABC News Close-Up.

As a result of Shayon's work as radio-TV critic for the Saturday Review, the Directors Guild of America named him the outstanding TV critic of 1963. He held that position at the Review for more than 20 years.

Shayon joined the faculty of the Annenberg School for Communication at the University of Pennsylvania as an associate professor in 1964, and he was promoted to professor of communication in 1965. Other than a leave of absence in 1970, he remained in that position until 1990.

== Personal life and death ==
Shayon and Russell were married for 47 years, until her death in 1983. He later married Nash Cox. Shayon died of pneumonia on June 28, 2008, at his home in Frankfort, Kentucky, aged 95.

== Radio programs ==
- Operation Crossroads (1946)
- The Eagle's Brood (1947)

== Books authored ==
- Television and Our Children (1951, Longmans, Green & Co.)
- Interaction: television public affairs programming at the community level (1960)
- Open to criticism (1971)
- The Crowd-catchers; Introducing Television (1973)
- Odyssey in Prime Time (2001, Waymark Press)

== Other sources ==
- Oral history interview with Shayon in the Columbia Center for Oral History Research collection
