= Richard Milburn =

Composer and musician

The cover of the sheet music for Listen to the Mocking Bird, published in 1855, credits the melody to Richard Milburn.

Richard Milburn, known as Whistling Dick, was an African-American musician in Philadelphia. He was a great guitarist and whistler and composed bird song themes including the tune Listen to the Mocking Bird which, when arranged with lyrics by Septimus Winner, became one of the most successful ballads of the 19th century, selling over twenty million copies of sheet music. Milburn made $5 for this while the finished work went on to make over $100,000.

Milburn worked in his father's barber shop in Lombard Street in Philadelphia. He also gave public performances of his bird whistling tunes which were organised by the Library Company of Philadelphia for the African Episcopal Church of St. Thomas.
