= Anton van Rooy =

Dutch opera singer (1870–1932)

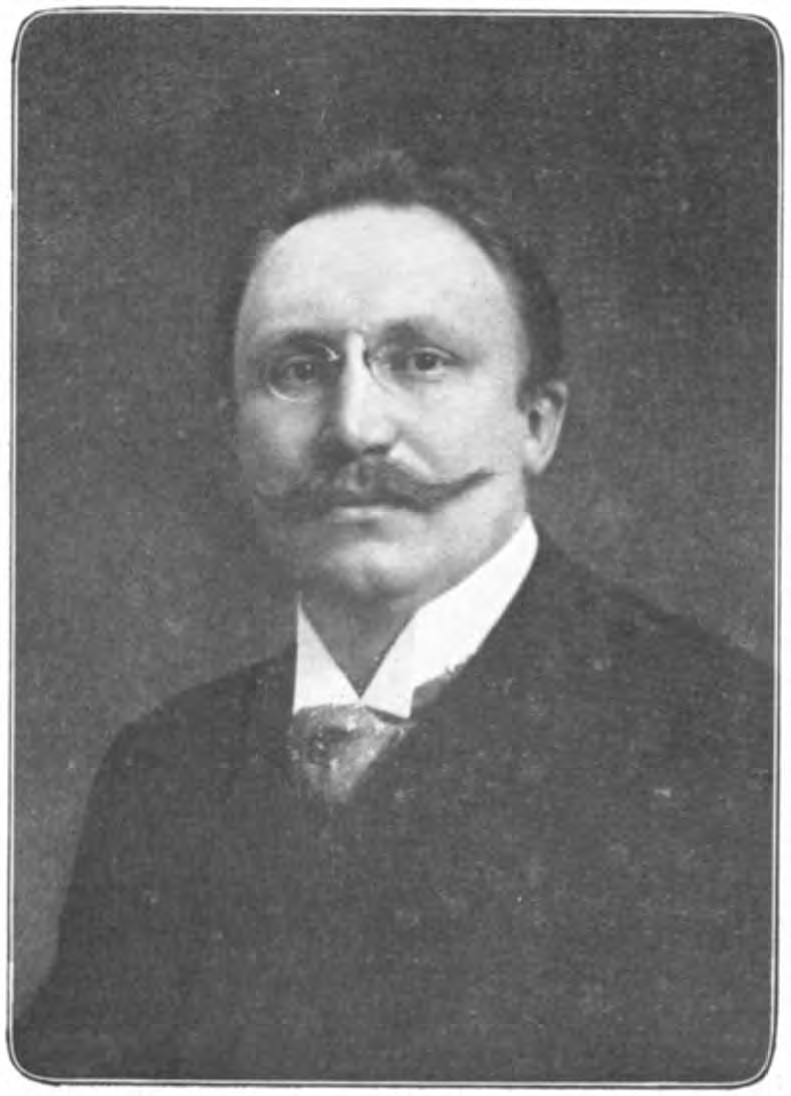
Anton van Rooy ca. 1911

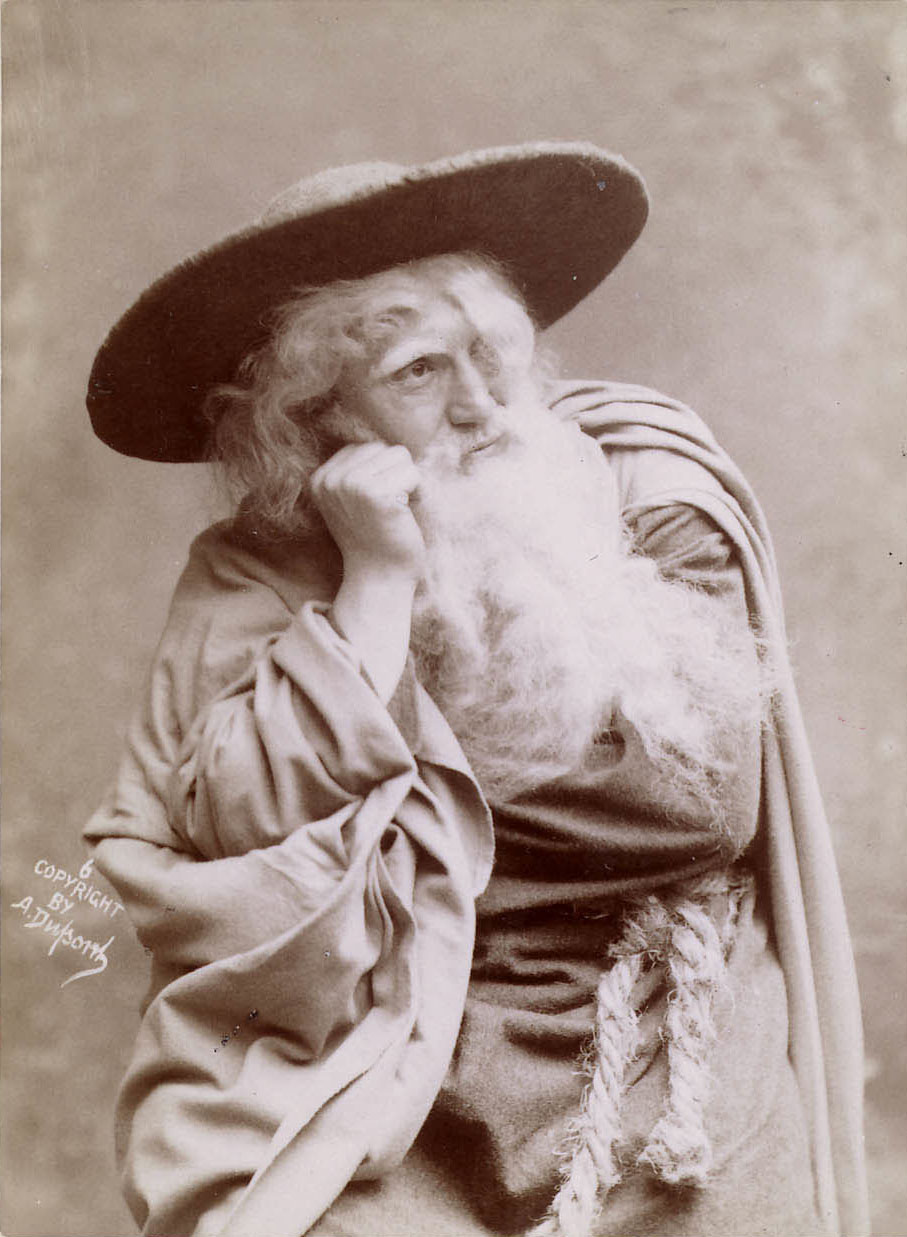
Anton van Rooy as The Wanderer in Wagner's Siegfried (ca. 1906), photo by Aimé Dupont

Anton van Rooy (1 January 1870 – 28 November 1932) was a Dutch bass-baritone. He had a voice of enormous proportions and is most remembered for his association with the music dramas of Richard Wagner, especially the Ring Cycle, The Mastersingers of Nuremberg and Parsifal.

Born in Rotterdam, van Rooy studied with the famous voice teacher Julius Stockhausen in Frankfurt. He made his operatic debut at the Bayreuth Festival in 1897, singing Wotan in Der Ring des Nibelungen. The year 1898 saw his debuts in Berlin and at the Royal Opera House in London; and on 14 December that same year he sang for the first time at the Metropolitan Opera, New York City, as Wotan in Die Walküre.

He remained with the Met until 1908, during which time he was heard in all the leading baritone Wagnerian roles. Most notably, he created Amfortas in the American premiere of Parsifal in 1903. Four years later, he created the part of John the Baptist in the initial New York production of Richard Strauss's then controversial opera Salome.

Van Rooy also continued to sing regularly at Bayreuth until 1903, when he was banned by Cosima Wagner from any further performances at the festival, because the Met performances of Parsifal that he had participated in breached German copyright law. His appearances in London spanned the years 1898-1913. He made gramophone discs and cylinder recordings, too, and was a noted song recitalist and soloist in oratorio.

Although the acoustically recorded discs and cylinders that van Rooy cut during the early 1900s were incapable of capturing the full majesty of his voice, they do demonstrate the strength of his high notes, the dark beauty of his tone and the sensitivity of his phrasing. They show why, to quote the Oxford Dictionary of Opera (second edition), "he was considered the finest [Hans] Sachs, Kurwenal and Wotan of the first decade" of the 20th century. Some of his recordings have been reissued on LP and CD.

After leaving the Metropolitan Opera, van Rooy became the leading Wagnerian baritone of the Frankfurt Opera; but by this juncture his voice had deteriorated prematurely due to vigorous over-use and his willingness to sing roles with a higher range than was ideal for his sonorous instrument.

Anton van Rooy died in Munich in 1932, at the age of 62.

== References and further reading ==
- David Ewen, Encyclopedia of the Opera: New Enlarged Edition. New York; Hill and Wang, 1963.
- Harold Rosenthal & John Warrack, The Concise Oxford Dictionary of Opera (second edition). London; Oxford University Press, 1980.
- Michael Scott, The Record Of Singing (volume one). London; Duckworth, 1977.
- Klaus Ulrich Spiegel: "Primat für Gesangskunst - Der epochale Wagnersänger Anton van Rooy" - Edition HAfG Acoustucs Hamburg 2014
