= Listen to the Mocking Bird =

1855 American popular song by Richard Milburn and Septimus Winner

"Listen to the Mocking Bird" (1855) is an American popular song of the mid-19th century. Its lyrics were composed by Septimus Winner under the pseudonym "Alice Hawthorne", and its music was by Richard Milburn.

It relates the story of a singer dreaming of his sweetheart, now dead and buried, and a mockingbird, whose song the couple once enjoyed, now singing over her grave. However, the melody is moderately lively.

"Listen to the Mocking Bird" was one of the most popular ballads of the era and sold more than twenty million copies of sheet music. It was popular during the American Civil War and was used as marching music. Abraham Lincoln was especially fond of it, saying, "It is as sincere as the laughter of a little girl at play."

Some of the earliest popular recordings were by John Yorke AtLee (1891); Joe Belmont (1899); Frank Stanley and Corinne Morgan (1904); and Alma Gluck (1915).

== Adaptations ==
The song's melody was reprised by Louis Prima and Keely Smith for their 1956 version of the song, with new lyrics by Bob Budston and Joe Falcon, entitled "Nothing's Too Good For My Baby", which appeared on their album The Wildest!

Bing Crosby included the song in a medley on his album 101 Gang Songs (1961).

Its verse was the instrumental introduction to a number of the early short films from 1935 to 1938 by The Three Stooges, rendered in a comical manner with birds chirping in the background. The first Stooges short to employ this theme was 1935's Pardon My Scotch; in later shorts the song was replaced with "Three Blind Mice." Perhaps not coincidentally, once and future Stooge Shemp Howard whistles it repeatedly throughout The Bank Dick.

The song later became associated as the theme of Terrytoons talking magpie characters Heckle and Jeckle.

In the movie Together Again (1944), the song is used as accompaniment to Gilda LaVerne's act at Leonardo's. After the place is raided, it is quoted twice as a reminder of the raid.

"Listen to the Mocking Bird" was parodied in the television series, The Flintstones, as a swinging jazz tune called "Listen to the Rocking Bird", in the 1961 episode "The Girls' Night Out".

"Listen to the Mockingbird" forms part of the "Merry-Go-Round Music" medley in Marvin Hamlisch's soundtrack for the 1973 motion picture The Sting, and is the only portion of the medley that can be heard in the actual movie.

"Listen to the Mocking Bird" was remade into a children's version for the show Barney & Friends. The tune is still the same but the lyrics were changed to make it more kid friendly. It debuted in Barney's Sense-Sational Day.

A Hawaiian-style arrangement is used as background music in later seasons of SpongeBob SquarePants.

In the movie The Alamo (2004), Davy Crockett plays "Listen to the Mocking Bird" on his fiddle to a crowd, although the song was not composed until 1855, 19 years after the Battle of the Alamo where Crockett died.

"Listen to the Mockingbird" was played on the piano by Jason Walton (Jon Walmsley) at the request of Miss Mamie and Miss Emily Baldwin (Helen Kleeb and Mary Jackson) on The Waltons TV series, Season 4, Episode 19 "The Burnout" (1976).

A 1953 Lux Radio Theatre adaptation of Daphne du Maurier's story "The Birds" includes a scene in which a character, listening to the radio for news of the bird attacks, flips the dial to one station only to hear Louis Armstrong's recording of the song being played.

The melody is a standard in the repertoire of many bluegrass and old-time country fiddlers, often as a novelty tune and including various bird calls played on the violin strings.

In the movie The Palm Beach Story (1942) The Ale and Quail Club is seen singing "Sweet Adeline" to Claudette Colbert. "Listen to the Mocking Bird" follows. It can be heard in the background.

In 2013, the Gettysburg College Singers released a cover of the song as part of a collection of music of the American Civil War.

== See also ==
- List of best-selling sheet music
