= Somebody's Gotta Go =

Song

"Somebody's Gotta Go" is a 1945 song by Cootie Williams and His Orchestra. With vocals performed by Eddie Vinson, the single was Cootie Williams' most successful entry on the Harlem Hit Parade, hitting number one on the Harlem Hit Parade. "Somebody's Gotta Go" was the final number one on The Harlem Hit Parade chart.
