= Dan Kelly (recording artist) =

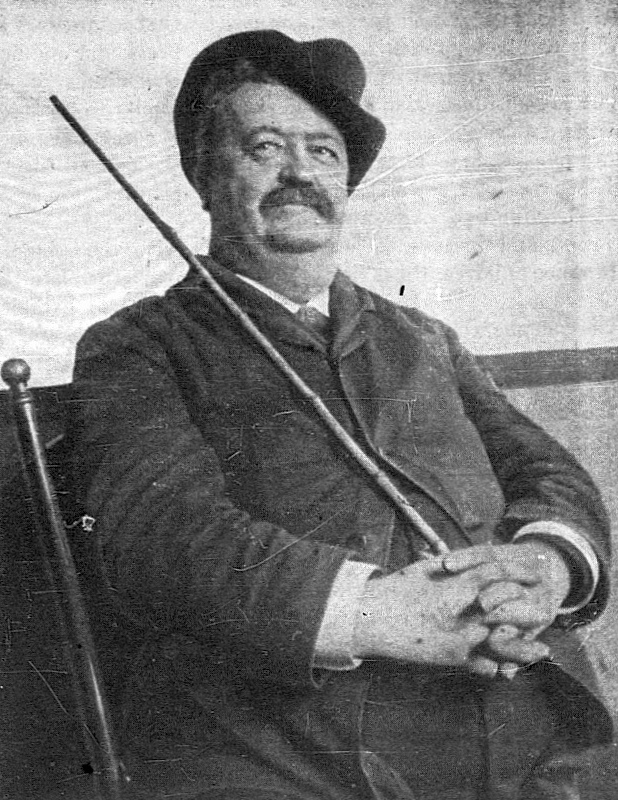
Dan Kelly, as pictured in The Phonogram magazine in 1893.

Dan Kelly was an American pioneer recording artist, best known for his 'Pat Brady' series of humorous recitations. Kelly was born in New York City January 22, 1842. Both of his parents were musicians, and he began performing at 13 years old, at Wyatt's Theater in Hartford, Connecticut. He continued in minstrel shows such as Bryant's and Christy's, as well as traveling panorama demonstrations, before moving to Cincinnati to record for the Ohio Phonograph Company (a regional subsidiary of the North American Phonograph Company). Kelly recorded also for the Columbia Phonograph Company and New Jersey Phonograph Company (also subsidiaries of North American at the time). An article in The Phonogram magazine speaks to his popularity in the early 1890s - "Where is there a phonograph in the United States or Canada without a Brady? The answer is, no-where!", and "Kelly [...] stands to-day the acknowledged head of all humorous talkers for the phonograph". For all of his fame in the earliest days of the phonograph industry, he doesn't seem to have made any recordings later than 1893 or 1894, and it's unclear what he did later in life. Because he only recorded onto 'brown wax' cylinders, few of his recordings survive today.
