= Franz Hitz =

Swiss pianist and composer

Franz Hitz (17 July 1828 – 20 November 1891) was a Swiss pianist and composer who lived and worked in France. He was primarily known for his many piano compositions which were much in vogue as salon music in the latter half of the 19th century.

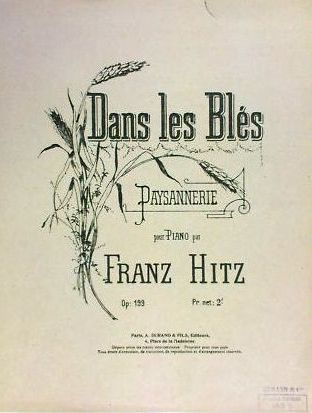
Cover of Dans les blés by Franz Hitz, published in Paris circa 1875

== Life and career ==
Hitz was born in Aarau, Switzerland, but later settled in Honfleur, a port town in northwestern France. He studied at the Paris Conservatoire — piano with Pierre Zimmermann and Adolphe Laurent and harmony with Henri Reber — and began publishing compositions in his early 20s. One of his earliest published works was a quadrille, Les Chapeaux de chez nous (The hats from home). The frontispiece had an engraving by the artist Louis Alexandre Dubourg, a friend of Hitz and a fellow resident of Honfleur. Another early work was the patriotic anthem Retour de l'aigle (The return of the eagle) commemorating the return of Prince Louis-Napoléon Bonaparte to France. In addition to his numerous piano works, his other compositions included a mass with organ accompaniment and several stage works. In 1870 L'Orphéon published his elementary textbook for piano students, Questionnaire musical: Notions élémentaires.

Franz Hitz died at Honfleur at the age of 63 and was buried in the cemetery there. The following year Le Ménestrel announced that a committee had been formed to raise money for the construction of a small mausoleum for his grave. Several of Hitz's compositions continued to be re-published into the 1920s, with some of his solo piano works such as Légende bretonne and Bonne nuit also arranged for orchestra by other composers.

== Compositions ==
Solo piano (selection)

Hitz's more than 200 compositions for solo piano include:

- Bonjour, Op. 146
- Pastorale in C, Op. 174
- Dans les blés, Op. 199
- Caprice - Bonne nuit, Op. 200
- Danse des Guarany, Op. 232
- Causerie, Op. 236
- Idylle - Le Grain de Blé, Op. 484

Stage works

- Le Rouet de Madeleine – opéra comique in 1 act, premiered in Le Havre, 1870
- Les Déesses du Battoir – operetta in 1 act to a libretto by Georges Chauvin, premiered at the Fantaisies Oller in Paris on 22 April 1877
- Le violon de Crémone – opera in 3 acts to a libretto by Georges Chauvin and Alfred Lecomte based on stories by E. T. A. Hoffmann, composed 1878
- Sous bois – operetta in 1 act to a libretto by Georges Chauvin published circa 1882
