= John Yorke AtLee =

American musician (1853-1933)

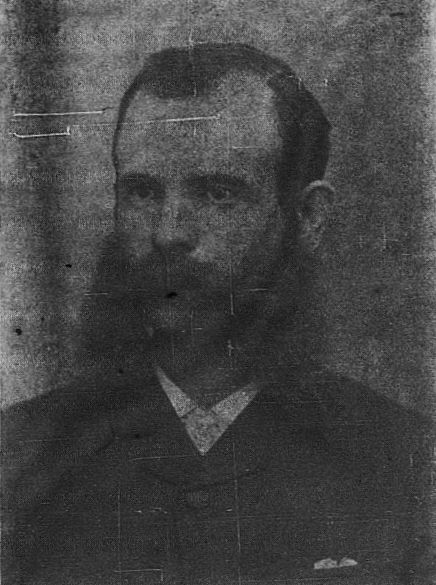
AtLee in August 1891 featured on magazine

John Yorke AtLee (1853–1933), who referred to himself as Mr. At, was an American musician and pioneer sound recording artist popular in the 1890s.

AtLee was born in Washington, D.C. on March 22, 1853. He was working as a government clerk in Washington D.C. when the Columbia Phonograph Company was incorporated in January 1889. AtLee was one of Columbia's star artists of the early 1890s, second only to the U.S. Marine Band. Due to the Columbia Phonograph Company's early adoption of musical recording, AtLee was one of the first popular recording musicians.

AtLee began recording for Columbia Records in 1893 and was known for his virtuosic whistling, a style popular in vaudeville at the time. His signature tune was "Listen to the Mocking Bird", an 1855 song by Richard Milburn. AtLee recorded prolifically for Columbia through 1897, and in 1898 went on to record for the Berliner Gramophone Company, singing "The Whistling Coon" and "The Laughing Song", signatures of George W. Johnson, another prominent whistler. His final recordings were for the Victor Talking Machine Company in May 1900.

AtLee married Ann Jennette Klock in 1883 in Prince George's County, Maryland. He died in Philadelphia on November 24, 1933, due to unknown causes.
