= The Seven Ages =

The Seven Ages is an orchestral suite by John Alden Carpenter. It premiered in New York City under the direction of Artur Rodziński on December 2, 1945 to positive reception. The piece is in seven uninterrupted movements, each lasting roughly two or three minutes, with total runtime just under twenty minutes. It was inspired by the famous soliloquy "All the world's a stage" from William Shakespeare's As You Like It. Each movement is meant to depict one of the ages of man.

It was the composer's third attempt to create a work based on the soliloquy and his last fully original composition, as his later years in composition, from 1935 on, had been focused on the revision and arrangement of other works.
