= Jean-Baptiste Lemire =

French composer (1867–1945)

Jean-Baptiste Lemire (8 June 1867 – 2 March 1945) was a French composer. He joined the French army in 1888 as a musician as Quarter-Major Musician Second-Class and later served as a drummer in a navy regiment. In all, he would served in the military for 25 years. He enrolled in the National Conservatory of Music and Dance in Lyon in 1893. After retiring from the army, he served as the conductor of a number of concert bands across France. Lemire retired from conducting in the 1930s. In 1935, he was awarded the Colonial Medal of Madagascar and elevated to the rank of Knight of the Medal of Anjouan of the Comores.

== Biography ==
Lemire was born in Colmar, in the Haut-Rhin department of France. He was the son of Jean-Baptiste (1844–1909), a mason, and Anne-Marie Sarter (1848–1924), a dressmaker. In 1871, France was defeated in the Franco-Prussian War, and his family was forced to flee their home and take refuge in Montbéliard, on the other side of the new border. Although the family regarded it as a temporary stay, Lemire resided in Montbéliard for 11 years. In April 1883, he began work as a locksmith in Belfort, where he remained until 1888.

== Military career ==
On 7 March 1888, Lemire entered the army as a musician, committed to volunteer for four years with the Crews of the Fleet, in Brest, as Quarter-Major Musician Second-Class, then later to the 52nd Navy regiment as Corporal Drummer and Sergeant Drummer Regimental Adjutant. In 1889–1891, Lemire joined the study campaign of the Dubourdieu as an accompanying musician. The ship departed from France on 29 November 1889, calling at the Canaries (11 January 1890), Senegal (25 January), Singapore (3 June), Honolulu (15 July), Tahiti (15 to 25 August), Nouméa (17 to 21 October), Sydney (30 October to 3 November), Peru (3 April 1891), California (31 July), and Venezuela (23 September), before returning to France via Trinidad (29 September).

In October 1891, Lemire committed to another five years with the Navy, and was placed in the 3rd regiment of Infantry of Navy, with his new title as Bugle Musician, and soon later Under-Chief of Fanfare. In his off-time he enrolled in the Conservatory of Lyons (CNSMD) (1893), and a year later won the First Prize of "Flûte Traversière" (transverse flute) in October 1894.

In 1896, he again renewed his military engagement for two years, and in the same regiment. From April 1897 to March 1898, he participated in the Colonial Infantry, in the Madagascar campaign. After extending his return again for four more years, in the 4th and 6th regiments of the Navy Infantry, he finally rose to Chief of Fanfare, participating in the Tonkin campaign (June 1900 - August 1901). He returned and left active service in 1902, entering the 7th regiment of Colonial Infantry Reserves. In the same season, he took the position of First Flute Solo with the municipal orchestra of Biarritz. In 1903, he left the 7th regiment for the 49th regiment of the territorial army reservers, where he stayed until the end of his 25-year military career in 1913, aged 46.

== Conductor ==
After retiring from the army, he undertook a tour of France's Orchestres d'Harmonie. He left his post in Biarritz in 1904, moving to Saint-Claude in Jura. In 1906–1907, he was the Chef de la Musique l'Espérance de Morez. During the two seasons of 1909 and 1910, he was chief of the Grand Théatre de Lyon. On March 1, 1910, he joined the Union Musicales d'Amplepuis (Rhône). After the outbreak of World War I he left the Union, but six months later in 1916 became the head of the Harmonie de Lalinde in Dordogne.

Lemire returned to Lyon in 1917, where his son, Jean (1917–1987), was born from his second marriage to Elisabeth Romeuf (1894–1966), originally from Saint-Ferréol-d'Auroure (upper Loire). He returned to Belfort in 1918, and his hometown of Colmar in 1919. On 24 May 1921, Lemire was appointed Chef de l'Harmonie for the house orchestra at a paper manufacturer at Anould in the Vosges, sharing this function with one of the former military musicians from the city of Lyon.

In 1931, Lemire left Lyon, subsequently moving to Sarthe. His son, Jean, was first a student of the military school in Autain, later of the Prytanée de La Flèche (1936–1938). After arriving in Sarthe, Lemire retired from conducting, though continued to give some music lessons.

== Later years ==
In 1935, having been decorated with the military medal of the Colonial Medal of Madagascar and elevated to the rank of Knight of the Medal of Anjouan of the Comores, he settled in the valley of Saint-Germain.

On 26 February 1945, aged 77, he was admitted to the hospital of La Flèche, where he died on 2 March.

== Works and legacy ==
Lemire began composing principally some time after being first appointed Chief of Fanfare. Rather than symphonies or operas, he composed what he described as "music of the open air", i.e. light and fashionable music aimed at the mass market rather than intellectual elites, such as marches, waltzes, polkas, scottisches, and "Pas Redoublés", where dancers divide into various formations.

For the transverse flute, his instrument, Jean-Baptiste composed some early works with piano accompaniment such as "Solo pour flûte" (Lyon 1904); later with orchestral accompaniment as in "Erimel" (Lyon 1905) and "Le Bouvreuil" (Paris 1907).

His many works for the philharmonic orchestra include "Acanthe Scottisch" (Lyon 1903), "Souvenir d'Alsace" (Valse, Lyon 1905), "Colmar Marche" (Lyon 1905), and "Riri Polka."

== Bibliography ==
- Ricard, Henry (1995). "Jean-Baptiste Lemire : vous connaissez ?". Le Journal fléchois (in French) (16): 135–140. ISSN 2022-6934. Basis for web pages in French, in German.
