= Abed Azrie =

French-Syrian singer and composer (born 1945)

Abed Azrie عابد عازرية
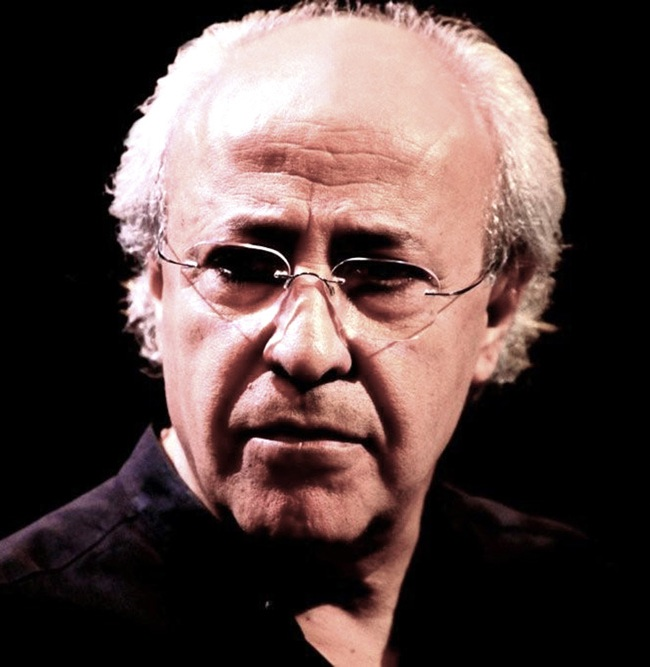
- Azrie in 2013

Background information
- Born: 1945 (age 80–81); Aleppo, Syria
- Genre: Arabic music
- Occupation: Musician
- Years active: 1990s–present

Abed Azrie or Abed Azrié (Arabic: عابد عازرية; born 1945) is a French-Syrian singer and composer, who performs classical music in a variety of languages, including Arabic, English, French, German, Spanish, and other. He describes his works as not belonging to any particular music tradition. In his work he sets ancient and modern Arabic, Sumerian, and other West Asian texts to traditional instruments (such as the ney, kanun, darbuka, violin, flute and lute), and synthesizers.

He was born in Aleppo, and after living for a time in Beirut moved to Paris at the age of 22 where he studied Western classical music. While there he translated classical poetry, such as the Sumerian Epic of Gilgamesh, into French. He has stated that he prefers to live in the West, saying in a 2000 interview that he has an "inability to work in the Arab countries, in which the way people live is still conditioned by halal and haram. Here I can produce contemporary art, I can work in freedom, and there is 'motion' around what I produce: journalism, concerts, programme...Nobody tells me to write a song for a specific political occasion."

His music has been featured in the films Al Leja, directed by Ryad Chaia, Elia Suleiman's Chronicle of a Disappearance. and Florence Strauss's "Between Two Notes" 2006, as well as in Jan Visser's 1975 TV documentary De Droom (The Dream), based on drawings by and interviews with Palestinian refugee children and Palestinian resistance poetry.

== Discography ==
- 1990: Aromates
- 1994: Epopée de Gilgamesh
- 1996: Lapis Lazuli
- 1999: Pour enfants seulement
- 1999: Omar Khayyam
- 2001: Venessia - sung in Venetian dialect.
- 2006: Suerte Live
- 2007: Chants d'amour et d'ivresse (Live A Radio France)
- 2008: Mystique - Sufi poems
- 2009: Évangile selon Jean oratorio in Arabic, 2CD
- 2010: Satie En Orient with Ensemble Sarband
- 2011: Epopée De Gilgamesh (New Recording 2011)
