= Johann Dubez =

Italian mandolin virtuoso, composer

Johann Dubez (1828 – 27 October 1891) was an Austrian composer and also played the mandolin, guitar, harp and zither.

Dubez was born and died in Vienna, Austria, and was of Italian descent.

Among his published compositions there are a Fantasia on Hungarian Melodies for guitar, issued by Diabelli and Co., Vienna. His opus numbers 11, 33, 34, 35 and 37 are harp solos, which were published by Cranz, Hamburg.
