= Paris 1945 =

Studio album by Django Reinhardt
- Released: 1968
- Recorded: December 1944 to January 1945 in Paris, France
- Genre: Swing jazz
- Label: Columbia France

Django Reinhardt chronology
Paris 1945 (1968)	Django Reinhardt and the Hot Club Quintet (1951)

Professional ratings
Review scores
Source	Rating
Allmusic	4/5 stars

Paris 1945 is a swing album featuring guitarist Django Reinhardt along with five members of Glenn Miller's Army Air Force big band. The songs on the album were recorded in Paris, France, and originally released as singles in 1945. The album was released in 1968.

On January 25, 1945, Reinhardt recorded four tunes with Bernie Privin on trumpet, Peanuts Hucko on tenor saxophone, Mel Powell on piano, Josz Schulman on bass and Ray McKinley on drums. In addition to these four tracks, the album included four tracks of Hucko playing clarinet with a trio, and several tracks of Powell on solo piano.

Miller's band members were all members of the United States Army Air Forces, and military regulations prohibited them from making commercial recordings. This led to a curious personnel listing on the original album that mentioned only Django Reinhardt by name. His accompanists were called the Jazz Club Mystery Hot Band, and the members were listed as U, V, W, X, Y and Z. Later reissues properly credited Glenn Miller's All Stars, the Ray McKinley Trio and Mel Powell.

== Track listing ==
1. "If Dreams Come True"
2. "Stompin' at the Savoy"
3. "Hallelujah"
4. "How High the Moon"
5. "Hommage a Fats Waller"
6. "Hommage a Debussy"
7. "After You've Gone"
8. "Shoemaker's Apron"
9. "China Boy"
10. "Sugar"
11. "Don't Blame Me"
12. "Poor Miss Black"
