= Viktor Selyavin =

Russian and Ukrainian operatic singer

Viktor Alekseyevich Selyavin Russian: Виктор Алексеевич Селявин (1875–1945) was a leading tenor of the Odessa Opera and Ballet Theater. He is often referred to as Odessa's Sobinov, a reference to Leonid Sobinov, one of the best known Russian tenors of the first half of the twentieth century. His repertoire included the tenor roles of most major operas, but he is best known for his interpretation of Lensky in Eugene Onegin. He also performed in chamber music, being especially fond of Mikhail Glinka's and Pyotr Ilyich Tchaikovsky's romances.

In 1920, Viktor Selyavin was appointed professor at the Conservatory of Odessa. In the 1930s he was also director of the Odessa Opera and Ballet Theater.
