= Symphony No. 3 (Malipiero) =

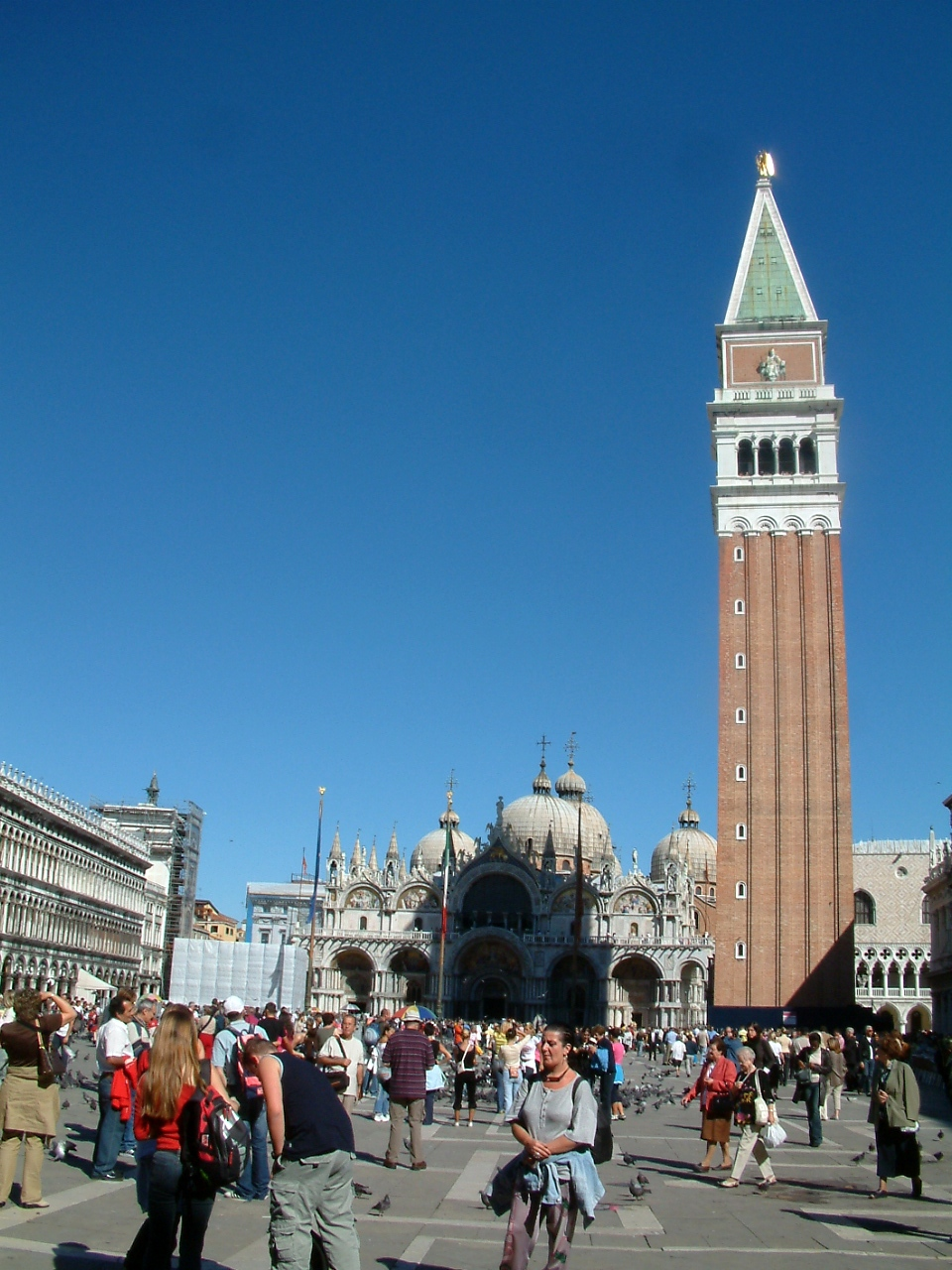

Gian Francesco Malipiero's Terza Sinfonia, delle Campane is the third of his eleven numbered symphonies and it was completed in February 1945, two months before the end of the Second World War in Italy with the fall of the Italian Social Republic. It was premiered on November 4 in Florence, with Igor Markevitch conducting.

The composition is inspired by the pealing of the St Mark's Campanile's bells in Venice, where Malipiero lived. The mournful finale reflects the night in September 1943 when the bells proclaimed the foundation of the Social Republic. In the composer's words, [the symphony] is connected to a terrible date, 18 September 1943. At dusk of that unforgettable day the bells of San Marco rang, but they couldn't deceive those who knew their true voice. They didn't ring for peace, but to announce new torments, more anguish.

The symphony lasts c. 24 minutes, and it consists of four movements:

1. Allegro moderato
2. Andante molto moderato
3. Vivace
4. Lento

== Recordings ==
- Moscow Symphony – Antonio de Almeida. Marco Polo, 1993 (later reissued by Naxos)
