= Sonatina for Violin and Harpsichord (Piston) =

1945 musical composition by Walter Piston

The Sonatina for Violin and Harpsichord is a three-movement, neoclassical chamber work composed by Walter Piston in 1945, that marks the beginning of his postwar style.

Piston wrote the Sonatina just after the Second World War, and its cheerful, optimistic character marks the beginning of the composer's postwar style. It is dedicated to Alexander Schneider and Ralph Kirkpatrick, the violinist and harpsichordist who premiered the work on November 30, 1945. The published score allows the piano as a substitute for the harpsichord, and it can sound equally good that way.

== Analysis ==
The composition is in three movements:

1. Allegro leggiero
2. Adagio espressivo
3. Allegro vivo

The Sonatina is a clear example of neoclassicism in Piston's work, and shows the influence of Igor Stravinsky. The sonatina-form first movement is in B♭ major, and is typified by a restless, exhaustive energy produced by abrupt changes to remote keys: F♯ minor, A major, and A♭ major. The movement concludes with a coda that blends elements from both main themes and accelerates to a precipitosa canonic finish.

The Adagio is a poised elegy in the key of A minor, with an excursion of the main theme into the distant key of F minor,

The finale, like the opening movement, is in sonatina form and in B♭, with a chromatic, humorous, and daring main theme that owes something to the Second Viennese School. The second theme features taut invertible counterpoint, and the entire movement brings the composition to a suitably delicate, unpretentious conclusion.

== Discography ==
- 1953. Alexander Schneider, violin; Ralph Kirkpatrick, harpsichord. New Music String Quartet. Modern American music series; Columbia masterworks. LP recording. Columbia ML 4495. With John Cage, String Quartet (in Four Parts) .
- 1974. Music for a 20th Century Violinist. Paul Zukovsky, violin; Gilbert Kalish, piano. 3-LP set. Desto DC 6435-37. Ralph Shapey: Evocation, for violin, piano, and percussion; Wallingford Riegger: Sonatina, op. 39; John Cage: Nocturne; George Crumb Night music II; Peter Mennin: Sonata Concertante; Morton Feldman: Vertical Thoughts 2; Michael Sahl: String Quartet; Henry Brant: Quombex, for viola d'amore, music boxes, and organ; Stefan Wolpe: Second Piece for Violin Alone; Walter Piston: Sonatina for Violin and Harpsichord; Roger Sessions: Duo for Violin and Cello; Milton Babbitt: Sextets for violin and piano; Arthur Berger: Duo no. 2; Harvey Sollberger: Solos, for violin, flute, clarinet, horn, double bass, and piano. Program notes by Nicolas Slonimsky.
- 1986. Robert Davidovici: Winner of the 1983 Carnegie Hall International American Competition for Violinists. Robert Davidovici, violin; Steven De Groote, piano; Paul Schoenfield, piano; Walter Piston: Sonatina for Violin and Harpsichord (piano). Gunther Schuller: Recitative and Rondo for Violin and Piano; Aaron Copland: Nocturne for violin and piano. Hugh Aitken: Partita for Solo Violin. Paul Schoenfield: Three Country Fiddle Pieces. LP recording. New World Records NW 334-1. CD recording NW334-2. New York: New World Records. Recorded Anthology of American Music, Inc.
- 1990. Darius Milhaud: Sonatina for Violin and Harpsichord, op. 257; Walter Piston: Sonatina for Violin and Harpsichord; Samuel Adler: Sonata No. 2 for Violin and Harpsichord; Bohuslav Martinů: Promenades for Violin, Flute, and Harpsichord; Edmund Rubbra: Fantasy on a Theme of Machaut, for Flute, Harpsichord, and String Quartet, op. 86; Cantata Pastorale, for Tenor Solo, Flute, Cello, and Harpsichord, op. 62; Antonín Dvořák: Bagatelles, for String Trio and Harmonium, op. 47. Tony Bouté, tenor; Bonita Boyd, flute; Charles Castleman and Julie Gigante, violins; Virginia Lenz, viola; Pamela Frame, cello; Barbara Harbach, harpsichord. CD recording. Albany TROY041. Albany, NY and Carnforth, Lancashire: Albany Records.
- 1994. The American Album. Anne Akiko Meyers, violin; André-Michel Schub, piano. Walter Piston: Sonatina for violin and harpsichord; Aaron Copland: Sonata for violin and piano, and Nocturne for violin and piano; Charles Ives: Sonata for Violin and Piano No. 4 "Children's Day at the Camp Meeting"; David Nathaniel Baker: Blues for Violin and Piano. CD recording. New York: RCA Victor Red Seal.
- 2000. American Harpsichord Music of the 20th Century: Mark Kroll. Mark Kroll, harpsichord; Nancy Armstrong, soprano; Carol Lieberman, violin; Alan Weiss, flute; Bruce Creditor, clarinet. CD recording. Albany TROY457. Albany, NY, and Carnforth, Lancashire: Albany Records. Lou Harrison: Six Sonatas for Cembalo (1943); Ellen Taaffe Zwilich: Fantasy for Harpsichord; Gardner Read: Fantasy-Toccata for solo harpsichord; Walter Piston: Sonatina for Violin and Harpsichord; Robert Starer: Yizkor and Anima aeterna for flute and harpsichord; Lester Trimble: Four Fragments from the Canterbury Tales, for high voice with flute, clarinet, and harpsichord.
