= Theodore Moses Tobani =

Theodore Moses Tobani (3 May 1855 − 12 December 1934) was a composer of popular music. He was born in Hamburg, Germany, and began studying violin when he was five years old. The family moved to the United States, where he attended the Rivington School in New York, but they returned to Europe when it became evident that Theodore was a musical prodigy. He was a concert violinist by the time he was 10. The family returned to the U.S. in 1870, and Theodore took positions as a violinist in several groups including Simpson's Theatre in Philadelphia, Wallack's Theatre, and several others.

His best known composition was "Hearts and Flowers", which he composed in half an hour in 1893, and which continued to sell more than 100,000 copies annually until the end of his life. He was so prolific that his publisher, Carl Fischer, insisted that he use multiple pseudonyms; Fischer was concerned that nobody would believe how much Tobani was composing. Another popular work was "Our Little Nestling", written in 1883 for Mrs. Lester Wallack, for which he was paid $35. He also composed "Around the Christmas Tree", subtitled "A Yule-Tide Potpourri", which was later arranged for band by Louis-Philippe Laurendeau.

Tobani was also a real estate dealer and owned property in Queens. He died on 12 December 1933; seven children survived him, but his wife, Helen, had died some time earlier.
