= String Quartet No. 2 (Bloch) =

The String Quartet No. 2 by Ernest Bloch was composed between 1940 and 1945. The quartet averages 34 minutes to perform. Bloch wrote it following a close study of Beethoven's sketches for the Eroica symphony.

After its premiere, Ernest Newman called the String Quartet No. 2 "the finest work of our time in this genre, one that is worthy to stand beside the last quartets of Beethoven". The composer himself called it "dry, not easy to listen to … and I doubt it will be liked".

Today it is typically regarded as the finest of Bloch's five quartets. Only in the second quartet did Bloch find a synthesis between formal sonata form structure and his "fundamentally improvisational and rhapsodic" thought, avoiding the weaknesses of cyclic procedures often evident in other works.

== Structure ==
The quartet is scored for 2 violins, viola and cello and is in four movements:

1. Moderato
2. Presto
3. Andante
4. Allegro molto
