= Leah Frances Russell =

Leah Frances Russell (28 March 1891 - May 1983) was an Australian opera singer.
