= Alphons Czibulka =

Hungarian musician

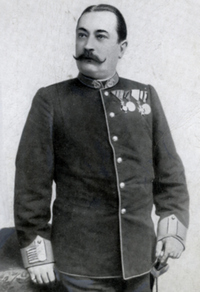
Alphons Czibulka

Alphons Czibulka (also written as Alfons or Alfonz; 14 May 1842 – 27 October 1894) was an Austro-Hungarian military bandmaster, composer, pianist and conductor.

== Life ==
Czibulka was born in the Spišské Podhradie (German: Kirchdrauf Hungarian: Szepesváralja) district of Spiš (Hungarian: Szepes County) in Upper Hungary, now Slovakia. He first came to prominence from the age of 15 touring Southern Russia giving piano recitals and concerts. He eventually became musical director at the French Opera in Odessa and at the National Theatre in Innsbruck. In 1865, he was second under Franz von Suppé as conductor at the Carl Theatre in Vienna.

From 1866 to 1869, he served as a military bandmaster in Austro-Hungarian Infantry Regiment No. 17 in Bolzano. From 1869 to 1870, he held the same position at the "23ern" in Petrovaradin and then, until 1871, with Infantry Regiment No. 20 in Kraków.

Success as conductor and composer in the military led Czibulka onwards to Kapellmeister for Infantry Regiment No. 25 in Prague from 1872 to 1880. In 1880 he was appointed representative of Austria-Hungary's military orchestra at the International Exhibition in Brussels. There he won First Prize at the exhibition’s Internationalen Musikkapellenkonkurrenz.

When Rudolf, Crown Prince of Austria became engaged, he dedicated to Princess Stéphanie of Belgium his Stephanie Gavotte, which became one of the most popular salon music pieces of the 19th century.

From 1880 to 1883 he was military bandmaster of Infantry Regiment No. 44 in Trieste. His opera Pentecost premiered in Vienna in 1884 and its success took it on to Florence and throughout Europe.

As a military bandmaster in the Infantry Regiment No. 31 in Vienna from 1883 to 1887 he held highly acclaimed composer-nights together with the musicians of the "30" under Carl Czerny (not related to the piano teacher). As a civilian he became music director in 1889 of the Concert House Flora in Hamburg. From 1891 to 1894 he again served as a military band conductor at the "19ern" in Vienna.

He conducted many giant Monstekonzerte at the Rotunda that had been built for the 1873 Vienna World Exhibition (Weltausstellung 1873 Wien).

Czibulka died in Vienna, and is buried at the Central Cemetery.

== Compositions ==
In the English-speaking world he is today best-remembered for his association with the famous piece "Hearts and Flowers" which was first a song created from the introduction 2/4 section of his work Wintermärchen Waltzes Op. 366 (1891). The soon-forgotten song was re-issued as a stand-alone instrumental under the same title as the song. "Hearts and Flowers" is the sentimental piece that has been frequently used to indicate mock tragedy in film and cartoon soundtracks.

Czibulka wrote over 300 works, especially Viennese-style dance music and marches. Of his stage works, his greatest successes were the operettas Pfingsten in Florenz (1884) and Der Glücksritter (1887). Other operettas include Der Jadjunker, Gil Blas, and Der Bajazzo. A substantial amount of his music is preserved in the music collection of the Vienna City Library.

One of his most well-known works, the composition, "Love's Dream After the Ball," is a charming and romantic waltz that gained popularity in the late 19th and early 20th centuries. The title suggests a dreamlike quality, and the music reflects the graceful and romantic atmosphere associated with waltzes of the time. This composition is often characterized by its melodic charm, expressive phrasing, and rhythmic vitality, which are typical features of the Viennese waltz tradition. The piece is well-suited for both dancing and listening, making it a favorite in ballrooms and concert halls alike.

In 1938 a street, Czibulkagasse, was named after him in Vienna's Simmering (11th District).

== Works ==
- Scene de Ballet op. 268
- Erzherzog Friedrich-Marsch op. 286 (1878)
- Stephanie-Gavotte op. 312 (1880)
- Vom Donaustrand, Marsch op. 339 (1887)
- Liebestraum nach dem Balle, Intermezzo op. 356 (1890)
- An Dich!, Walzer-Serenade op. 390 (1894)

== Literature ==
- Friedrich Anzenberger, Alfons Czibulka (1842-1894), Militärkapellmeister und Komponist, Wiener Stadt- und Landesbibliothek 2000, Publikationen der Wiener Stadt- und Landesbibliothek, Band 5.
- "Czibulka Alfons". In: Österreichisches Biographisches Lexikon 1815–1950 (ÖBL). Vol. 1, Austrian Academy of Sciences, Vienna 1957, p. 164.
