= Aldo Finzi (composer) =

Italian composer

Aldo Finzi (Milan, 4 February 1897 – 7 February 1945) was an Italian classical music composer.

== Biography ==
Aldo Finzi was born to an ancient Jewish family in Milan on February 4, 1897.

After completing his classical studies at the Parini high school in Milan, he graduated in law from the University of Pavia. Simultaneously, he graduated in composition as a private student at the Accademia S. Cecilia in Rome.

He soon achieved success and fame among young Italian musicians: operas, chamber music, symphonic music, a comic opera "La serenata al vento", a dramatic work inspired by anti-Semitic persecution, "Shylock", which remained unfinished and was performed in this form (Milan and Marseille), are among his compositions. At 24, he had become one of the authors whose works were published by Ricordi, while previously his publishers were Fantuzzi and Sonzogno.

In the 1931 Ricordi catalogue, his compositions include "Il chiostro" for female voices and orchestra, the symphonic poems "Cirano di Bergerac", nominated in a competition whose judging panel included Arturo Toscanini and Ildebrando Pizzetti, and "Inni alla notte", a "Sonata for violin and piano" (now published by Suvini & Zerboni), a "Quartet for strings", various lyrics (Barque d'or, Serenata), a comic comedy in three acts, precisely "La serenata al vento" (published by Ricordi).

In the following years, his most important works include "L'infinito," a symphonic poem from 1933; "Interludio," a concert for piano and orchestra from 1934; and "Numquam," a symphonic poem for piano and orchestra from 1937.

In 1937, La Scala announced a competition for a new work that would be performed in the following season: Finzi participated with "La serenata al vento"; among the members of the judging panel was Riccardo Pick-Mangiagalli, who confidentially approached his young colleague to announce his victory in the competition. The official announcement, expected in the spring of 1938, did not arrive due to the Italian racial laws. The work was then performed as a world premiere in 2012 at the Teatro Donizetti in Bergamo.

In 1939 he wrote a symphonic poem ("Come all'ultimo suo ciascuno artista"); in 1940 he composed "Danza", a concert for 2 pianos, saxophones and orchestra; in 1942 "Shylock", a dramatic opera with a libretto by Rossato. Only the first act was set to music: Finzi then wrote the rhythmic text of two other acts, which he did not have time to set to music (in November 2022, the integrated version was performed for the first time in Verona). In 1944, he wrote "Prelude and Fugue for Organ", composed during the Nazi occupation in Turin, where the author had taken refuge.

Between 1944 and 1945, he composed the "Psalm for Choir and Orchestra" to thank the Lord for the salvation he and his son obtained following the SS raid. ↵The works are published by Ricordi, Suvini & Zerboni, and Preludio, and the CDs are by Nuova Era, Bel Air, and Preludio. They can all be found on iTunes.

Aldo Finzi died on February 7, 1945.

His music has now been performed - in addition to many cities in Italy - in almost the entire European continent, as well as in the USA, Canada, Panama, Mexico, Israel, Japan, and Australia... Following recent great successes at Carnegie Hall (the latest of which featured guest star Plácido Domingo), the American press has defined Finzi as “the Italian Strauss”.
