= Hearts and Flowers =

1893 instrumental associated with melodrama in films

Song

Audio sample
- Hearts and Flowers (Instrumental violin version) by the Victor Orchestra, recorded in 1908: file; help

"Hearts and Flowers" (subtitle: "A New Flower Song") is a song composed by Theodore Moses-Tobani (with words by Mary D. Brine) and published in 1893 by Carl Fischer Music.

The famous melody is taken from the introductory 2/4 section of "Wintermärchen" Waltzes Op. 366 (1891) by the Hungarian composer Alphons Czibulka. Tobani arranged the piece in a 4/4 song form as Hearts and Flowers, a New Flower Song, Op. 245. The song as a vocal number was soon forgotten but the instrumental version gained popularity in its own right and it is in this form that it remains well known to this day. Tobani also arranged the tune as a waltz, featured in a medley published in 1900 entitled Beauties Charms, although this arrangement is now seldom heard.

"Hearts and Flowers" has an association in popular culture as melodramatic photoplay music. The practice of using the selection as a dramatic cue is documented as early as 1911, although complaints that the tune was becoming overplayed crop up as early as 1913 and 1914, and by 1915, the piece was being called "time worn".

Soon thereafter, "Hearts and Flowers" (along with Gustav Lange's "Flower Song") became more commonly associated with underscoring an over-the-top parody of melodrama in film. Around 1919, musical accompaniment cue sheets start suggesting the tune "a la burlesque" to mock-dramatic scenes. Even into the late 1920s, "Hearts and Flowers" continued to be suggested as a burlesque dramatic piece.

"Hearts and Flowers" was not only heard in theater as accompaniment to films, but played an integral part of on-set music for actors. Viola Dana famously requested the tune to be played in order for her to generate enough emotion for her to cry real tears. This was later parodied in the 1928 film Show People with Marion Davies.

The song eventually became a byword for maudlin love songs. It was used in the title of a chart hit for singer Johnny Desmond in 1954, "Play Me Hearts and Flowers (I Want to Cry)".

The term 'hearts-and-flowers' has entered the English language with the sense "extreme sentimentality, cloying sweetness".

The 1958 Jack Kirby comic story "Hearts and Flowers" makes direct reference to the song as outdated but still moving, prompting the hip, street-wise narrator to use the song as shorthand for his own romantic nature: "The music that came out was square as a frame. But it washed against me like the waters of a dark ocean..."

There is a reference to "Hearts and Flowers" in Amazing Spider-Man #19, published December, 1964 and Amazing Spider-Man #45, published February, 1967.

Although there is a song called "Hearts and Flowers" in Noël Coward's play Family Album, both lyrics and music were written by Coward. It is a slow waltz, sentimental in mood but not the same piece written by Moses-Tobani.

The song is also heard in the opening cutscene of the classic Apple IIGS game The Three Stooges, where Ma sadly informs the Stooges that the orphanage is going to be foreclosed by the evil banker, I. Fleecem, if she does not pay rent with in 30 days. After the song ends, Moe says "We got to figure out a way to get some money, and get it quick" (a soundbite from their short Three Sappy People).

In 1930, a stop motion silent film called "Hearts and Flowers" directed by Howard S. Moss references the original song, produced by Warner Brothers' Vitaphone Varieties. The plot follows a little girl named Dolly Daisy who goes on a wild date with two boys. One was a rascal named Morris and the other was a dapper dandy one named Victor.

In 1983, it was featured in A Christmas Story. When Ralph imagines himself as blind, the music of "Hearts and Flowers" plays in the short moment where he arrives at the door of his old house.

The song also appeared in the series Doctor Who during the 2025 episode "Lux", where the character Mr. Ring-A-Ding plays the song.
