= Tippin' In =

"Tippin' In" is an American song with music by Robert Lewis "Bobby" Smith and lyrics by Marty Symes. It was a 1945 instrumental hit by Erskine Hawkins and His Orchestra. The single went to number one on the Race Records chart for six non-consecutive weeks and became Hawkins's most successful pop hit, reaching number nine.

== Other Recordings ==
- A recording by Ralph Flanagan and His Orchestra was made at Manhattan Center, New York City, on July 18, 1952. It was released by RCA Victor Records as catalog number 20-4885 (in United States) and by EMI on the His Master's Voice label as catalog number B 10350.
