= 1899 in music =

Events in the year 1899 in music.

== Specific locations ==
- 1899 in Norwegian music

== Events ==
- January 25 – Adelina Patti marries her third husband, Baron Rolf Cederström.
- March 3 – Richard Strauss conducts the premiere of Ein Heldenleben with the Frankfurter Opern- und Museumsorchester.
- April 26
  - Jean Sibelius conducts the world première of his Symphony No. 1 in Helsinki.
  - Tenor Antonio Paoli makes his début in Rossini's William Tell in Paris.
- May 27 – Maurice Ravel conducts the first public performance of his 1898 Shéhérazade, ouverture de féerie at a concert of the Société Nationale de Musique in Paris; it receives a critical reception and is not published in his lifetime.
- June 19 – Edward Elgar's Enigma Variations (Variations on an Original Theme, Op. 36) are premiered at St James's Hall in London conducted by Hans Richter. A revised version is first heard on September 13 at the Three Choirs Festival in Worcester Cathedral with Elgar conducting.
- September 18 – Scott Joplin's Maple Leaf Rag is registered for copyright as ragtime music enjoys mainstream popularity in the United States.
- October 19 – Claude Debussy marries Rosalie Texier, having lived for nine years with her best friend; the marriage lasts only five years.
- December 30 – Samuel Coleridge-Taylor marries Jessie Walmisley.
- date unknown
  - Charles Hale's song "At a Darktown Cakewalk" includes an early appearance of the riff "Shave and a Haircut".
  - Billy Murray makes his singing debut.

== Published popular music ==
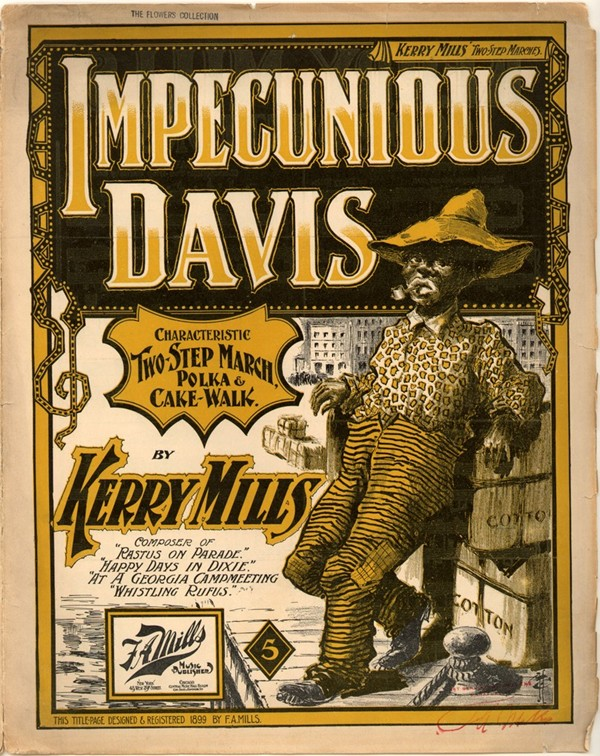

- "Absent" w. Catherine Young Glen m. John W. Metcalf
- "Always!" w. Charles Horwitz m. Frederick V. Bowers
- "Cake Walk in The Sky" by Ben Harney
- "Come Home Dewey We Won't Do a Thing to You" w.m. Paul Dresser
- "A Coon Band Contest" m. Arthur Pryor
- "Cotton Pickers Rag & Cakewalk" by William Braun
- "Doan Ye Cry, Mah Honey" w.m. Alfred W. Noll
- "Hands Across the Sea" m. John Philip Sousa
- "Hearts and Flowers" w. Mary D. Brine m. Theodore Moses Tobani
- "Hello! Ma Baby" w.m. Ida Emerson & Joseph E. Howard
- "I'd Leave My Happy Home for You" w. Will A. Heelan m. Harry Von Tilzer
- "If Only You Were Mine" w. Harry B. Smith m. Victor Herbert
- "I'll Be Your Sweetheart" w.m. Harry Dacre
- "Impecunious Davis" by Kerry Mills
- "Keep on the Sunny Side", w. A. Blenkhorn, m. J.H. Entwisle
- "Mandy Lee" w.m. Thurland Chattaway
- "Maple Leaf Rag" by Scott Joplin
- "Mosquito Parade" m. Howard Whitney
- "My Little Georgia Rose" w. Robert F. Roden m. Max S. Witt
- "My Wild Irish Rose" w.m. Chauncey Olcott
- "'O sole mio!" w. Giovanni Capurro m. Eduardo di Capua
- "A Picture No Artist Can Paint" w.m. J. Fred Helf
- "She Was Happy Till She Met You" w. Charles Graham m. Monroe H. Rosenfeld
- "Smoky Mokes" m. Abe Holzmann
- "Stay in Your Own Back Yard" w. Karl Kennett m. Lyn Udall
- "The Story of the Rose" (aka "Heart Of My Heart") w. "Alice" m. Andrew Mack
- "Telephone Me, Baby" w.m. George M. Cohan
- "There's Where My Heart Is Tonight" w.m. Paul Dresser
- "When most I wink" m. Frank Bridge
- "Where the Sweet Magnolias Grow" w. Andrew B. Sterling m. Harry Von Tilzer
- "Whistling Rufus" w. W. Murdock Lind m. Kerry Mills
- "You Tell Me Your Dream, I'll Tell You Mine" w. Seymore Rice & Albert H. Brown, m. Charles N. Daniels

== Recorded popular music ==
- "Abide With Me" (w. Rev Henry Francis Lyte m. William Henry Monk)
  – Frank C. Stanley on Edison Records
- "Always!" (w. Charles Horwitz m. Frederick V. Bowers)
  – May Kelso on Edison Records
  – Harry Macdonough on Edison Records
- "Asleep In The Deep" (w. Arthur J. Lamb m. Henry W. Petrie)
  – William Hooley on Edison Records
- "Ave Maria" (w. (Fr) Paul Bernard m. Charles Gounod)
  – M. A. Guarini on Edison Records
  – W. D. McFarland on Berliner Records
- "Because" (w. Charles Horwitz m. Frederick V. Bowers)
  – Albert C. Campbell on Edison Records
  – Sousa's Band on Berliner Records
- "Believe Me, if All Those Endearing Young Charms" (w. Thomas Moore m. trad)
  – J. J. Fisher on Edison Records
- "The Boy Guessed Right" (w.m. Lionel Monckton)
  – Albert C. Campbell on Edison Records & Berliner Records
- "The Cake Walk" (trad US)
  – Eugene Stratton with piano Leslie Stuart on Berliner Gramophone
- "Calvary" (w. Henry Vaughan m. Paul Rodney)
  – Albert C. Campbell on Berliner Records
- "Comin' Thro' The Rye" (w. Robert Burns m. trad)
  – Syria Lamonte with piano Fred Gaisberg on Berliner Gramophone
- "Cotton Blossoms" (m. M. H. Hall)
  – Sousa's Band on Berliner Gramophone
- "Curse of the Dreamer"
  – Dan W. Quinn on Columbia Records
- "Down The Road" (w.m. Fred Gilbert)
  – Gus Elen on Berliner Gramophone
- "Eli Green's Cakewalk" (w.m. David Reed & Sadie Koninsky)
  – banjo Vess L. Ossman on Edison Records
- "Emmet's Lullaby" (w.m. J. K. Emmet)
  – George P. Watson on Edison Records
- "Funiculi-Funicula" (w. G. Turco m. Luigi Denza)
  – Hotel Cecil Orchestra on Berliner Gramophone
- "The Future Mrs 'Awkins" (w.m. Albert Chevalier)
  – Albert Chevalier on Berliner Gramophone
- "God Save The Queen"
  – Frank C. Stanley on Edison Records
  – Sousa's Band on Berliner Records
- "Gypsy Love Song" (w. Harry B. Smith m. Victor Herbert)
  – Eugene Cowles on Berliner Records
  – William Hooley on Edison Records
- "Hands Across The Sea March" (m. John Philip Sousa)
  – Peerless Orchestra on Edison Records
  – Sousa's Band on Berliner Records
- "Hearts And Flowers" (w. Mary D. Brine m. Theodore Moses Tobani)
  – violin Chris De Arth on Berliner Records
- "Hello! Ma Baby" (w.m. Ida Emerson & Joseph E. Howard)
  – Arthur Collins on Edison Records
  – Len Spencer on Berliner Records & Columbia Records
  – Imperial Minstrels on Berliner
- "The Holy City" (w. Frederick Edward Weatherly m. Stephen Adams)
  – Harry Macdonough on Edison Records
- "Home Sweet Home" (w. John Howard Payne m. Sir Henry Rowley Bishop)
  – whistling John Yorke Atlee on Berliner Records
- "I Dreamt I Dwelt In Marble Halls" (w. Alfred Bunn m. Michael William Balfe)
  – J. W. Myers on Berliner Records
- "I Guess I'll Have To Telegraph My Baby" (w.m. George M. Cohan)
  – Arthur Collins on Edison Records
  – Edward M. Favor on Berliner Records
  – George J. Gaskin on Columbia Records
- "I'd Leave My Happy Home For You" (w. Will A. Heelan m. Harry Von Tilzer)
  – Arthur Collins on Edison Records
- "If It Wasn't For The 'Ouses In Between" (w. Edgar Bateman m. George Le Brunn)
  – Gus Elen on Berliner Gramophone
- "If Only You Were Mine" (w. Harry B. Smith m. Victor Herbert)
  – Albert C. Campbell on Edison Records
- "It's A Great Big Shame" (w. Edgar Bateman m. George Le Brunn)
  – Gus Elen on Berliner Gramophone
- "Jack's The Boy" (Greenbank, Jones)
  – H. Scott Russell with p. Fred Gaisberg on Berliner Gramophone
- "Just As The Sun Went Down" (w. Karl Kennett m. Lyn Udall)
  – J. W. Myers on Berliner Records
  – S. H. Dudley & Harry Macdonough on Edison Records
- "Just One Girl" (w. Karl Kennett m. Lyn Udall)
  – Sousa's Band on Berliner Records
  – Albert C. Campbell on Edison Records
  – H. Scott Russell with p. Amy Williams on Berliner Gramophone
  – J. W. Myers on Columbia Records
- "Kathleen Mavourneen" (w. Annie Crawford (Barry) m. Frederick William Nichols Crouch)
  – William F. Hooley on Edison Records
- "Kiss Me, Honey Do" (w. Edgar Smith m. John Stromberg)
  – Albert C. Campbell on Berliner Records
  – Len Spencer on Berliner Records & Columbia Records
  – Arthur Collins on Edison Records
- "Little Dolly Daydream" (w.m. Leslie Stuart)
  – Eugene Stratton on Berliner Gramophone
- "Little Old New York is Good Enough For Me"
  – Dan W. Quinn on Berliner Records
- "The Lost Chord" (w. Adelaide Anne Procter m. Sir Arthur Sullivan)
  – William F. Hooley on Berliner Records
- "Mandy Lee" (w.m. Thurland Chattaway)
  – Albert C. Campbell on Edison Records
  – Arthur Collins on Edison Records
- "'Mid The Green Fields Of Virginia" (w.m. Charles K. Harris)
  – Albert C. Campbell on Berliner Records
  – S. H. Dudley & Harry Macdonough on Edison Records
  – George J. Gaskin on Columbia Records
- "Mister Johnson, Turn Me Loose" (w.m. Ben Harney)
  – John Terrell on Berliner Records
- "Molly's The Girl For Me"
  – J. Aldrich Libbey on Columbia Records
- "The Moth And The Flame" (w. George Taggart m. Max S. Witt)
  – Albert C. Campbell on Edison Records
  – J. J. Fisher on Edison Records
- "My Little Georgia Rose" (w. Robert F. Roden m. Max S. Witt)
  – Jere Mahoney on Edison Records
- "My Old Dutch" (w. Albert Chevalier m. Charles Ingle)
  – Albert Chevalier on Berliner Gramophone
- "My Old New Hampshire Home" (w. Andrew B. Sterling m. Harry Von Tilzer)
  – Jere Mahoney on Edison Records
  – Byron G. Harlan & A. D. Madeira on Edison Records
  – Albert C. Campbell on Berliner Records
  – George J. Gaskin on Berliner Records
  – The Greater New York Quartette on Columbia Records
- "My Wild Irish Rose" (w.m. Chauncey Olcott)
  – Albert C. Campbell on Edison Records
- "Night Hymn At Sea"
  – Clara Butt & Kennerley Rumford on Berliner Gramophone
- "The Old Brigade" (w. Fred E. Weatherly m. Orlando Barri)
  – H. Scott Russell with piano Fred Gaisberg on Berliner Gramophone
- "Old Man's Story"
  – J. Aldrich Libbey on Columbia records
- "The Old Oaken Bucket" (w. Samuel Woodworth m. E. Kaillmark)
  – Haydn Quartette on Berliner Records
- "The Organ Grinder's Serenade"
  – J. Aldrich Libbey on Columbia Records
- "A Picture No Artist Can Paint" (w.m. J. Fred Helf)
  – Albert C. Campbell on Edison Records
  – George J. Gaskin on Columbia Records
- "She Is The Belle Of New York" (w. Hugh Morton m. Gustave Kerker)
  – Frank Lawton with p. Fred Gaisberg on Berliner Gramophone
- "She Was Bred In Old Kentucky" (w. Harry Braisted m. Stanley Carter)
  – Albert C. Campbell on Berliner Records
  – George J. Gaskin on Columbia Records
- "She Was Happy Till She Met You" (w. Charles Graham m. Monroe H. Rosenfeld)
  – Jere Mahoney on Edison Records
  – Dan W. Quinn on Columbia Records
- "Smoky Mokes" (m. Abe Holzmann)
  – Len Spencer on Columbia Records
  – Dan W. Quinn on Edison Records
  – Vess L. Ossman on Columbia Records
- "The Soldiers Of The Queen" (w.m. Leslie Stuart)
  – Albert Christian with p. Leslie Stuart on Berliner Gramophone
- "Sweet Rosie O'Grady" (w.m. Maude Nugent)
  – Lil Hawthorne on Berliner Gramophone
- "Take A Pair Of Sparkling Eyes" (w. William S. Gilbert m. Arthur Sullivan)
  – Herbert Scott Russell with p. Fred Gaisberg on Berliner Gramophone
- "'Tis The Last Rose Of Summer" (w. Thomas Moore m. Richard Alfred Milliken)
  – J. W. Myers on Berliner Records
- "Toreador Song" (w. H. Meilac, Ludovic Halévy m. Georges Bizet)
  – Montague Borwell on Berliner Gramophone
- "Whistling Rufus" (w. W. Murdock Lind m. Kerry Mills)
  – Len Spencer on Berliner Records
  – Sousa's Band on Berliner Records
  – banjo Vess L. Ossman on Columbia Records & Berliner Records
  – Dan W. Quinn on Edison Records
- "Yes, Let Me Like A Soldier Fall" (w. Edward Fitzball m. Vincent Wallace)
  – Ferruccio Giannini on Berliner Records
- "You've Been A Good Old Wagon" (Harney)
  – Len Spencer on Columbia Records & Berliner Records

== Classical music ==
- Hugo Alfvén – Symphony No. 2 in D
- Tor Aulin – 4 Aquarellen for Violin and Piano, Op. 12 or 15
- Amy Beach – Piano Concerto in C♯ minor, Op. 45 (198/9)
- Joseph Callaerts – Toccata, Op.29
- Frederick Delius – Paris, Nocturne
- Friedrich Diethe – Romanze for Bass Clarinet
- Ernő von Dohnányi – Sonata for Cello and Piano in B♭ minor
- Edward Elgar
  - Variations on an Original Theme (Enigma), Op. 36
  - Dry Those Fair, Those Crystal Eyes
  - Sérénade lyrique, for orchestra
- George Enescu – Violin Sonata No. 2 in F minor, Op. 6
- Axel Gade – Concerto No. 2 for violin and orchestra in F major
- Louis Glass – Symphony No. 2 in C minor
- Reinhold Glière – Symphony No. 1
- Leopold Godowsky – 3 Concert Studies, Op.11
- Theodore Gouvy – Paraphrases symphoniques, Op.89
- Edvard Grieg – Ave maris stella, EG 150
- Johan Halvorsen – Norwegian Festival Overture
- Siegmund von Hausegger – Barbarossa
- Hans Huber – Concerto No. 3 for piano and orchestra
- Scott Joplin – Maple Leaf Rag
- Ferdinand Kühne – Geburstags-Marsch, Op.41
- Max Laurischkus
  - Elegie, Op.2
  - Duos, Op.3
- Luise Adolpha Le Beau – Elegy, Op.44
- Ernst Mielck – Finnish Suite, Op. 10
- Ethelbert Nevin – En Passant, Op.30
- Maurice Ravel – Pavane pour une Infante défunte, for piano
- Vladimir Rebikov
  - 3 Morceaux, Op.7
  - Suite de ballet, Op.14
- Jean Sibelius – Symphony No. 1 in E minor
- Josef Suk – Symphony No. 1 in E major
- Arnold Schoenberg – Verklärte Nacht

== Opera ==
- Eugen d'Albert – Kain
- Antonín Dvořák – The Devil and Kate
- Josef Bohuslav Foerster – Eva
- Victor Herbert – The Ameer, premiered October 10 in Scranton
- Isidore de Lara – Messaline
- Jules Massenet – Cendrillon (composed 1894–5, premiered 1899)
- Nicolai Rimsky-Korsakov – The Tsar's Bride, (premiered November 3 in Moscow)
- Max von Schillings – Der Pfeifertag, Op.10 (premiered February 26 in Schwerin)

== Musical theater ==
Floradora

- Die Landstreicher – Karl Michael Ziehrer
- El Capitan London production
- Florodora (Music: Leslie Stuart Lyrics: Sidney Jones & Paul Rubens Book: Owen Hall) London production opened at the Lyric Theatre on November 11
- A Gaiety Girl London revival opened at Daly's Theatre on June 5
- Helter-Skelter Broadway production
- The Rogers Brothers In Wall Street Broadway production
- The Rose of Persia (music by Sir Arthur Sullivan, libretto by Basil Hood) London production opened at the Savoy Theatre on November 29
- San Toy London production opened at Daly's Theatre on October 21

== Births ==
- January 7
  - Al Bowlly, South African-born British singer (died 1941)
  - Francis Poulenc, French composer (died 1963)
- January 10 – Daniel Guilet, French-born American violinist (died 1990)
- January 14 – Herbert Sumsion, English composer and organist (died 1995)
- January 21 – Alexander Tcherepnin, Russian pianist and composer (died 1977)
- February 15 – Georges Auric, French composer (died 1983)
- February 21 – Clara Clairbert, Belgian operatic soprano (died 1970)
- March 5 – Patrick Hadley, British composer (died 1973)
- March 10 – Finn Høffding, Danish composer (died 1997)
- March 13 – Pancho Vladigerov, Bulgarian composer (died 1978)
- March 26 – William Baines, English composer and pianist (died 1922)
- April 5
  - Leonard Falcone, Italian-born American baritone/euphonium virtuoso, director of bands at Michigan State (died 1985)
  - Bernhard Kaun, American Hollywood filmscore composer (died 1980)
- April 7 – Robert Casadesus, French pianist and composer (died 1972)
- April 29 – Duke Ellington, American jazz musician and composer (died 1974)
- May 1 – Jón Leifs, Icelandic composer (died 1968)
- May 6 – Billy Cotton, English bandleader (died 1969)
- May 10 – Fred Astaire, American dancer, actor and singer (died 1987)
- May 25 – Panka Pelishek, Bulgarian pianist and music teacher (died 1990)
- May 30 – Jack Little, British-born American singer and songwriter (died 1956)
- June 1 – Werner Janssen, American conductor and composer (died 1990)
- June 9 – Signe Amundsen, Norwegian operatic soprano (died 1987)
- June 11 – George Frederick McKay, American composer (died 1970)
- June 13 – Carlos Chávez, Mexican composer and conductor
- June 16 – Helen Traubel, American opera singer (died 1972)
- June 19 – Pat Ballard, American songwriter (died 1960)
- June 21 – Pavel Haas, Czech composer (killed 1944)
- June 30 – Harry Shields, American jazz musician (died 1971)
- July 1 – Thomas A. Dorsey, American "father of gospel music" (died 1993)
- July 3 – Benny Nawahi, American ukulele player (died 1985)
- July 10 – André Souris, Belgian composer and writer (died 1970)
- July 17 – James Cagney, American actor, singer and dancer (died 1986)
- July 18 – Felipe Pinglo Alva, Peruvian composer (died 1938)
- July 30 – John Woods Duke, American composer (died 1984)
- August 6 – Margarete Klose, operatic mezzo-soprano (died 1968)
- September 6 – Billy Rose, Broadway producer and lyricist (died 1966)
- September 9 – Maria Yudina, pianist (died 1970)
- September 11 – Jimmie Davis, country and gospel singer-songwriter and politician (died 2000)
- September 13 – Ephraim Amu, composer, musicologist and music teacher (died 1995)
- September 25 – Ricard Lamote de Grignon, conductor and composer (died 1965)
- September 26 – William L. Dawson, composer (died 1990)
- October 9 – Mary Jarred, opera singer (died 1993)
- October 19 – Sidonie Goossens, harpist (died 2004)
- October 31 – Ted Shapiro, songwriter and pianist (died 1980)
- November 9 – Mezz Mezzrow, jazz musician (died 1972)
- November 17 – Toscha Seidel, violinist (died 1962)
- November 18 – Eugene Ormandy, violinist and conductor (died 1985)
- November 22 – Hoagy Carmichael, composer, pianist and singer (died 1981)
- November 29 – Gustave Reese, musicologist (died 1977)
- November 30 – Hans Krása, Czech-German composer (killed 1944)
- December 2 – Sir John Barbirolli, conductor (died 1970)
- December 11 – Julio de Caro, composer (died 1980)
- December 16 – Noël Coward, dramatist, actor, singer and composer (died 1973)
- December 18 – Muriel Brunskill, operatic contralto (died 1980)
- December 21 – Silvestre Revueltas, composer (died 1940)
- date unknown – Sadettin Heper, composer (died 1980)

== Deaths ==
- January 10 – Albert Becker, composer, 64
- February 3 – Amalie Joachim, contralto and voice teacher (born 1839)
- February 4 – Eduard Holst, Danish composer, playwright, actor, dancer and dance master, 52
- April 17 – Hans Balatka, composer, 72
- April 23 – Lucien Delormel, lyricist (born 1847)
- May 21 – Louise Tunison, composer and organist, 26
- May 29 – Frantz Jehin-Prume, violinist, composer, and music educator, 60
- June 3 – Johann Strauss II, composer, 73
- June 10 – Ernest Chausson, composer, 44 (bicycle accident)
- June 16 – August Winding, composer, 64
- August 17 – Erik Bøgh, journalist, dramatist and songwriter, 77
- August 28 – Guillermo Morphy, musicologist, 63
- October 10 – Allan James Foley, operatic bass, 62
- October 11 – John Troutbeck, musicologist (b. 1832)
- October 13 – Aristide Cavaillé-Coll, organ-builder, 88
- October 15 – Johann Nepomuk Fuchs, conductor and composer, 57
- October 18 – Gussie Davis, songwriter, 36
- October 22 – Ernst Mielck, composer, 21 (tuberculosis)
- October 23 – Ludwig Straus, violinist, 64
- October 31 – Hugh Talbot, singer and actor, 54
- November 16 – Vincas Kudirka, lyricist of the Lithuanian national anthem, 40 (tuberculosis)
- November 25 – Robert Lowry, hymn writer, 73
- December 7 – Anton de Kontski, pianist and composer, 82
- December 10 – Hans von Milde, operatic baritone, 78
- December 20 – Romain Bussine, poet, baritone, and voice teacher, 69
- December 21
  - Joseph Dupont, violinist, theatre director and conductor, 61
  - Charles Lamoureux, conductor and violinist, 65
- December 23 – Marietta Piccolomini, operatic soprano, 65
- December 31 – Carl Millöcker, conductor and composer, 57
