= Then you'll remember me =

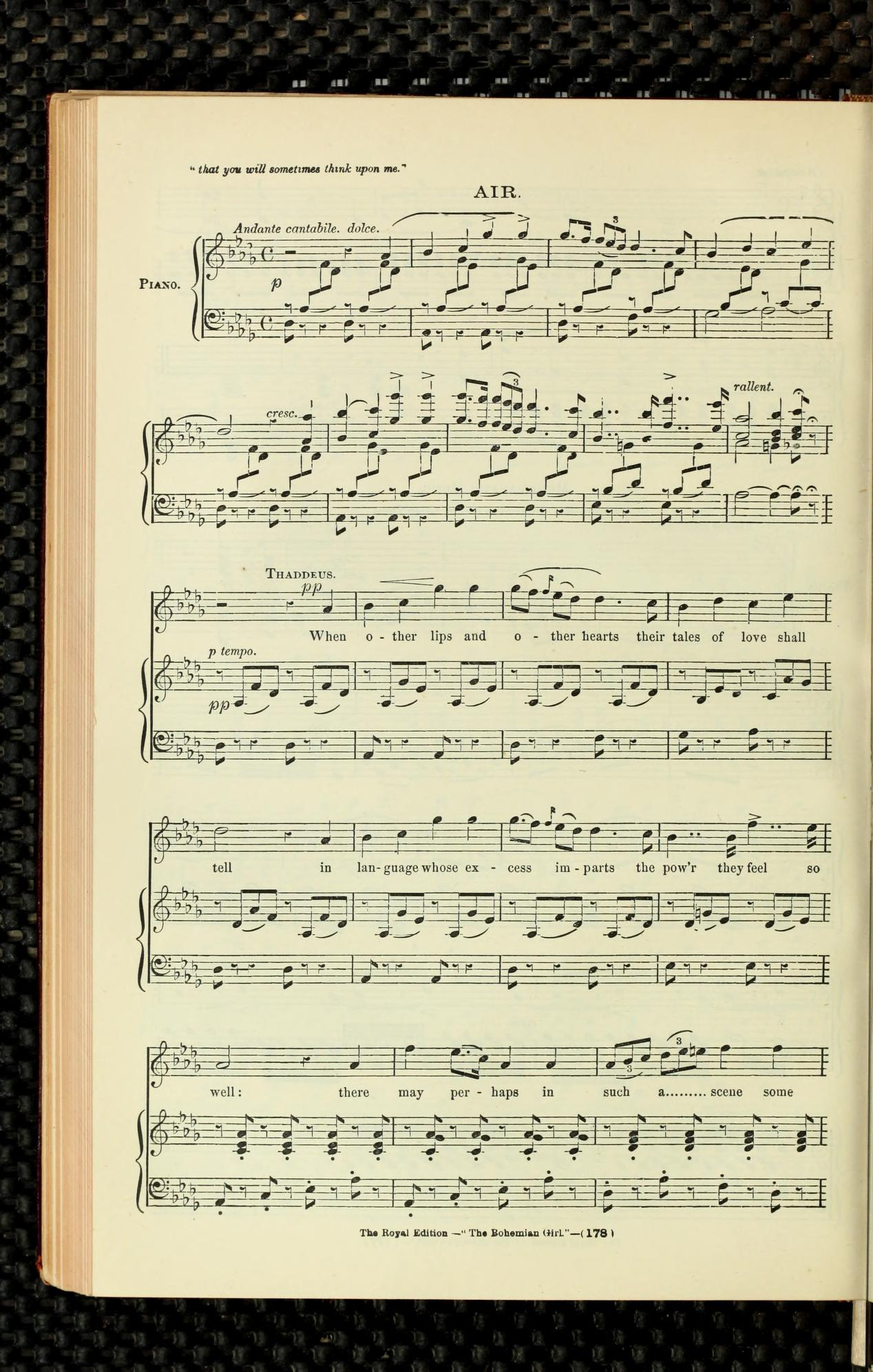
The opening page of the score

The tenor aria known as "Then you'll remember me" from its refrain (less commonly as "When other lips" or "When other lips and other hearts" from its first words) is one of the most noted and lastingly popular collaborations of the Irish composer Michael Balfe and the librettist Alfred Bunn. Different editions describe it variously as an air, a cavatina, a cavatine, a romance, and a ballad. Marked andante cantabile, it is sung by the character Thaddeus in Act 3 of the opera The Bohemian Girl (1843). It features an obbligato for the cornet, then a newly invented instrument. It has been recorded many times, both in its original form and in instrumental versions.

== Genesis ==
William Harrison, the tenor who created the role of Thaddeus, later remembered that Balfe had taken the aria through six or seven versions before coming up with one that satisfied him. This is confirmed by manuscript evidence, which shows that many things were altered in the process of composition, including the rhythm and the key. The first performance of The Bohemian Girl took place on 27 November 1843 at the Drury Lane Theatre. Harrison's performance of the aria produced a great uproar in the audience, favourable from the majority but unfavourable from others; in the end it was encored twice.

== Reception ==
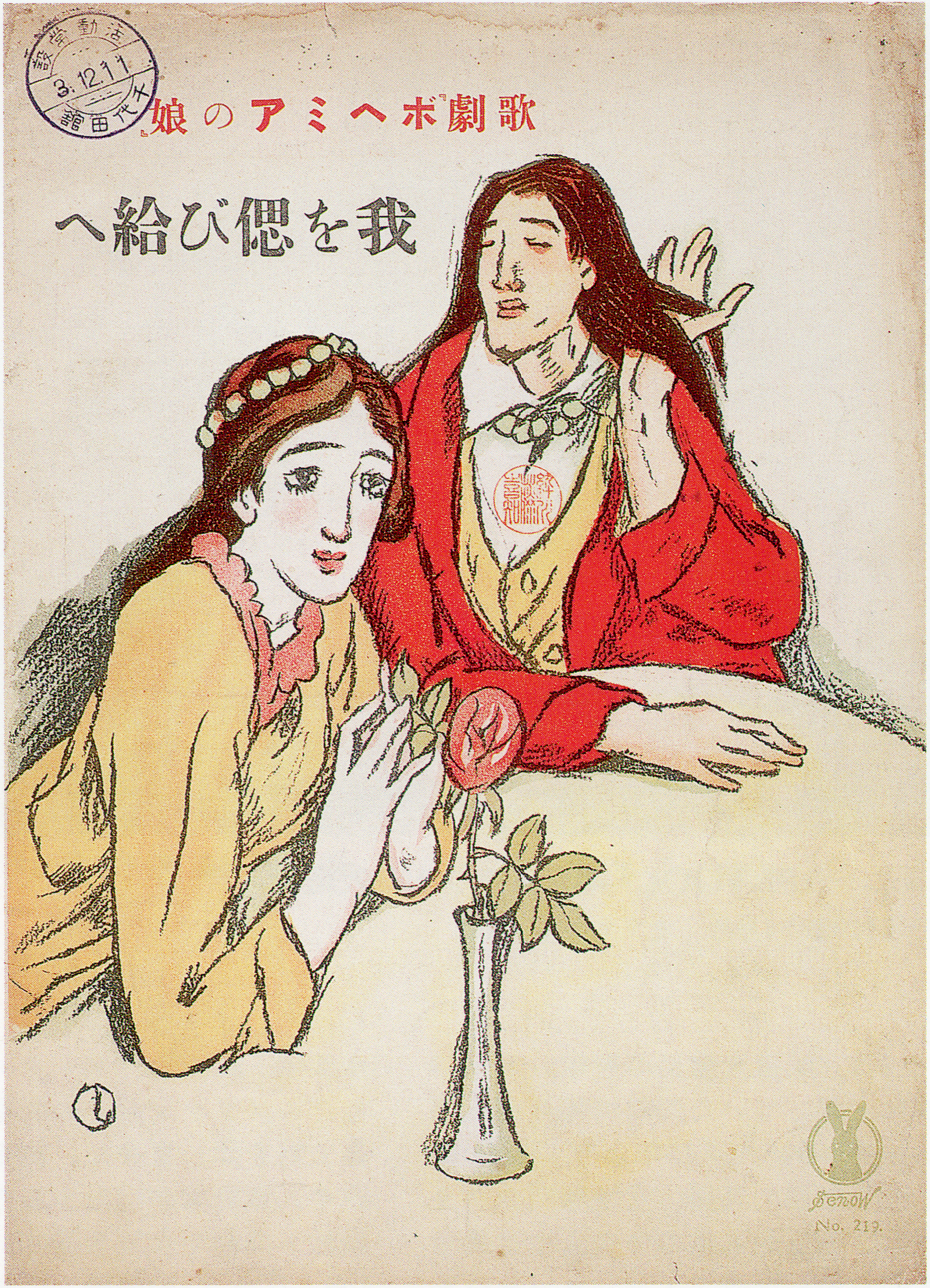
The cover illustration by Yumeji Takehisa of sheet music of "Then you'll remember me" published in the early 20th century in Japan

The publishing rights for the songs in The Bohemian Girl were bought by Chappell & Co. for £500. The score of "Then you'll remember me" was being advertised within weeks of the first performance, and was an immediate bestseller, 80,000 copies being sold within a year. It became a favourite of street musicians, including barrel-organists or cornetists. In 1885 George Bernard Shaw observed that as a duet for cornet and harp it could "draw tears from a crowd at the door of a gin-palace". In 1898 George du Maurier believed that it "seems destined to become immortal in this country", and indeed a century later, according to The Rough Guide to Opera, it remained "justifiably famous". It has been praised by the musicologist Nigel Burton, who considered that "Balfe's subtle use of accented passing notes perfectly expresses the genuine pathos of Bunn's lyrics."

== Legacy ==
The aria is performed by characters in Mrs Henry Wood's immensely popular novel East Lynne (1861), in George Bernard Shaw's play The Philanderer (1893), and in L. P. Hartley's novel The Go-Between. The lines "When other lips and other hearts" and "Then you'll remember me" appear many times, variously transmuted, in James Joyce's Finnegans Wake. The 1936 Laurel and Hardy film The Bohemian Girl features "Then you'll remember me" sung by Felix Knight. For its 1974 reissue, Charlie Chaplin had the final scene of his 1919 film Sunnyside accompanied by an orchestral arrangement of "Then you'll remember me" made for him by Eric Rogers. The song was featured in a cutscene in the 2015 game Assassin's Creed: Syndicate in which the main antagonist Crawford Starrick sings and plays the song on piano.

== Recordings ==
"Then you'll remember me" was recorded before 1895 on the Berliner Gramophone label. Since then, singers who have recorded it include Mario Chamlee, Richard Crooks, Charles D'Almaine, Ben Davies, Beniamino Gigli, Charles Hackett, Jerry Hadley, George Hamlin, Ruby Helder, Edward Lloyd, John McCormack, Marie Narelle, James Melton, Heddle Nash, Patrick Power, Thomas Round, Rosalie Sorrels, Louise Terrell, the Opera Babes, and the Irish folk group De Dannan. Instrumental versions have been recorded by, among others, Jesse Crawford, Charles Leggett, Fats Waller, Edna White, and the McKee Trio.
