= Ferruccio Giannini =

Italian opera singer (1868-1948)

- Born: 15 November 1868; Ponte d'Arbia, Tuscany, Kingdom of Italy
- Died: 17 September 1948 (aged 79); Bywood, Upper Darby, Pennsylvania, United States
- Occupations: Tenor; opera singer; theater director
- Spouse: Antonietta Briglia Giannini (m. 1894; died 1934)
- Children: 6, including: Dusolina Giannini; Vittorio Giannini
- Relatives: Margaret Giannini (niece)

Ferruccio A. Giannini (1868–1948) was an Italian-American tenor, opera singer and theater director, and member of the Giannini family.

== Early life and education ==
Ferruccio A. Giannini was born on 15 November 1868 in Ponte d'Arbia, to Givanni Giannini and Euphemia Cardosi.

In 1885, Giannini emigrated to the United States aged 17. In Boston Giannini studied singing under Eleodoro De Campi.

== Career ==
In 1891, Giannini made his debut in Boston. Before settling in Philadelphia in 1893, he performed in the Strakosch Opera Company until around 1892, when he met Antonietta Brigilia.

A singing teacher, he opened a small theater in Philadelphia where he organized operas and concerts with his students. He was then the founder of the Verdi Opera House in Philadelphia (1905). He also founded the Royal Marine Band of Italy (originally Banda Rossa) in the late 1890s.

Between 1896 and 1913 he recorded for numerous recording companies, namely Berliner, Victor, the Columbia Phonograph Co. and Rex.

Married to the violinist Antonietta Briglia, their three children all had brilliant careers in the world of opera. Dusolina Giannini was a famous dramatic soprano who performed on the main stages of Europe and America. Eufemia Giannini Gregory was a voice teacher at the Curtis Institute of Music for 40 years, counting celebrities such as Anna Moffo and Judith Blegen among her students . Vittorio Giannini was a renowned composer of operas.

== Recording sessions ==
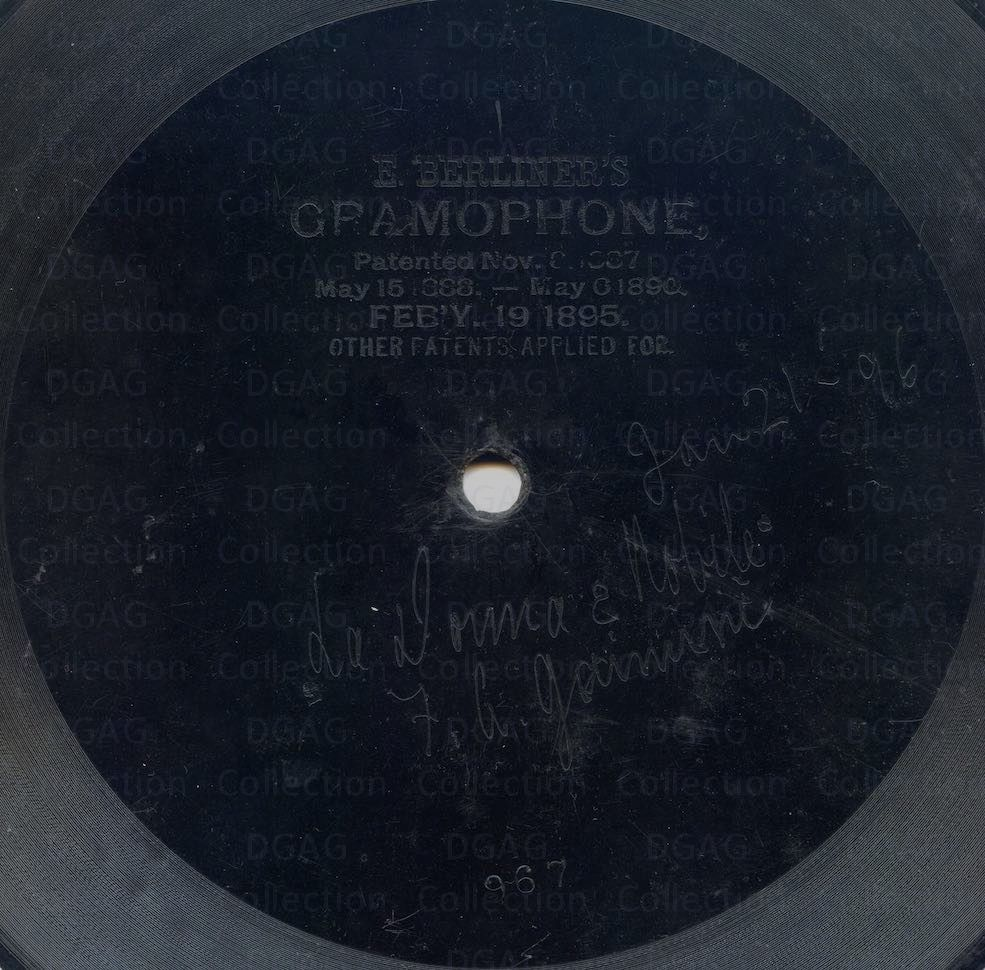
Berliner 967 - La Donna è Mobile. Notice Ferruccio's full name (F. A. Giannini)

In 1896, Ferruccio Giannini was contacted by Emile Berliner and offered to record opera excerpts for the Berliner Gramophone company's headquarters in Philadelphia. There, he recorded his first plate, an excerpt of Rigoletto's "La donna è mobile" (Berliner 967). A few months later, he returned and recorded numerous plates from March 1896 to November 1898, and in 1899 he participated in three recording sessions, totalling over 83 confirmed recordings (under numerous iterations of around 60 matrix numbers), of which less than half are preserved online.

He also recorded from June 1903 to October 1904 for the Victor Talking Machine Co. and the Columbia Phonograph Co. and from 1908 to 1913 for Rex records. Additionally, there are a few gold-moulded cylinders recorded for the Edison Phonograph Co. from ca. 1905.

== Notable recordings ==
Berliner 967 - La Donna è Mobile

Berliner 967 - "La Donna è Mobile" ("Rigoletto")

Berliner 902a - Siciliana

Berliner 902a - "Siciliana" ("Cavalleria Rusticana")

Berliner 903 - "Di Quella Pira" ("Il Trovatore")

Berliner 932 - "Viva il Vino" ("Cavalleria Rusticana")

Berliner 905a - M'appari

Berliner 905a - "M'appari" ("Martha")

Berliner 902/971 - "The Palms"

Berliner 983 - "Questa o quella" ("Rigoletto")

Berliner 985 - "Funiculi Funicula" (sic)

Berliner 1740 (?) - Quando le sere al placido

-Berliner 1740 (likely unreleased master) - "Quando le sere al placido" ("Luisa Miller")

+Berliner 0572 -"Miserere" (Il Trovatore")

Victor 2404 - Funiculi Funicula

-Victor 2404 - "Funiculi Funicula"

-Victor 2506 - "Violets"

Columbia 1738 - "Miserere" ("Il Trovatore")

Rex F 5088 - "E lucevan le stelle" ("Tosca")

== In popular culture ==
Berliner 0572 - Miserere

During his life, Ferruccio Giannini only achieved mild success, having to close his theatre in 1929 due to economical hardships (his theatre venue was meant to be for low-price opera sessions and events, so it had to work on an extremely tight budget) and not giving too many full opera concerts outside of student debuts and extra-ordinary events. Though, nowadays his popularity had been ever-so-slightly increasing due to the phenomenon of vintage resurrection, having uncovered some of his early records. It is remarkable the plate BeA 0572 ("Miserere"), having been used all over the album "Everywhere at the End of Time", representing an advanced stage of dementia (due to its extremely poor audio definition).

== Personal life ==
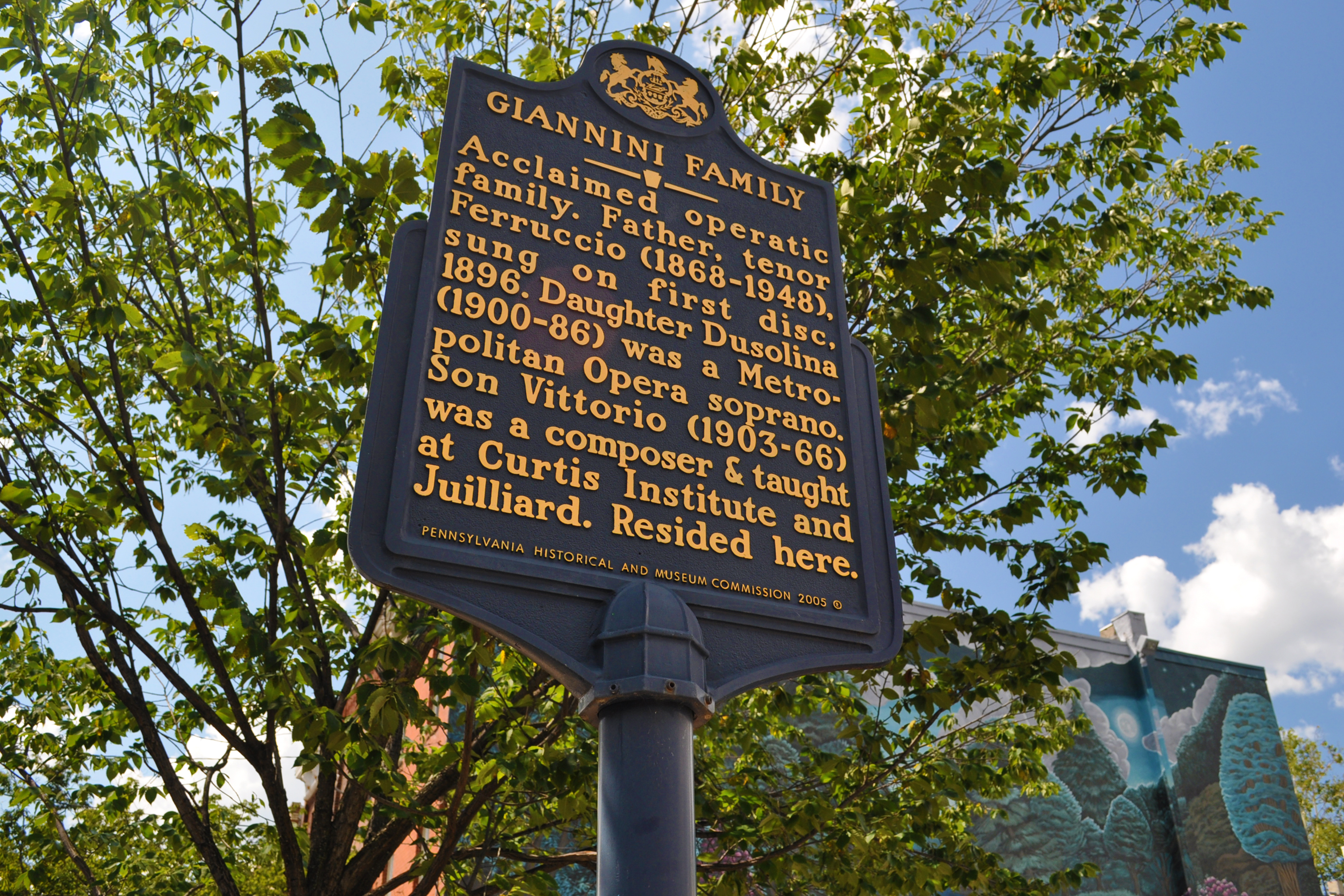
Giannini Family Historical Marker, 735 Christian Street, Philadelphia, Pennsylvania

In 1894, Giannini married the violinist Antonietta Briglia Giannini. Together the couple had six children:

- Euphemia Giannini Gregory (1895–1979), a voice teacher at the Curtis Institute of Music.
- Raimondo Giannini (1897–1900), died aged 2 years and 3 months.
- Dusolina Giannini (1899–1986), dramatic soprano, prima donna, opera singer and music teacher.
- Ferruccio Giannini (1902–1902), died age 10 months.
- Vittorio Giannini (1903–1966), a composer.
- Francis Ferruccio Giannini (1908–1982), physician.

Giannini's niece was Margaret Giannini. In 2005, the Pennsylvania Historical & Museum Commission erected a historical marker at the site of the Giannini family home.
