= Alan Kelly =

Alan Kelly may refer to:

- Alan Kelly (politician) (born 1975), Irish Labour Party politician
- Alan Kelly (discographer) (1928–2015), Scottish physicist considered a pioneer and of discographers
- Alan Kelly Sr. (1936–2009), Irish footballer
- Alan Kelly Jr. (born 1968), his son, Irish former footballer
- Alan Kelly (drummer), musician
- Alan Kelly (referee) (born 1975), football referee
- Alan Rowe Kelly (born 1959), American actor, director, writer and producer
