= Odeon Haymarket =

Former cinema in London, England

Coordinates: 51.5096°N 0.1330°W

The Odeon Haymarket was a cinema on Haymarket, London. Three cinemas occupied the site between 1925 and 1996, predecessors being Capitol Cinema (1925–1936) and Gaumont Haymarket (1937–1959). It became the Odeon Haymarket in 1962, before closing in 1996.

== Capitol Cinema (1925–1936) ==
Built by Sir Walter Gibbons and opened in 1925, this was a large and ornate cinema in a Neo-Classical style, created as part of a development of an island site on this major London thoroughfare.

Designed by Andrew Mather (architect of many later Odeon cinemas), the cinema used theatrical norms of stalls and circle seating, together with a number of boxes. An organ was installed and used during intermissions. Total seating was 1,700. In May 1928, Walter Gibbons company General Theatres Corporation was taken over by Gaumont British Theatres.

The cinema is noted as the location of the first run of the first British 'talkie', Alfred Hitchcock's Blackmail in 1929. In its basement the Kit Kat Club was located, one of the most famous London nightclubs of the Roaring Twenties (not to be mixed up with an older political club similarly named).

In 1935, Gaumont decided to completely reconstruct the Capitol, by lowering the auditorium to take in the former basement premises of the Kit Kat Restaurant. The last film to play at the Capitol Cinema was Tom Walls in Foreign Affaires, on 18 January 1936.

== Gaumont Haymarket (1937–1959) ==
The new cinema, known both as Gaumont Cinema and Gaumont Haymarket, was created by completely gutting the Capitol and turning the upper floors into offices. Seating was split between circle and stalls and totaled 1,328. A Compton organ was installed and the interior design was typical Art Deco. The entrance was moved from the north corner to the centre of the building, which had originally been the entrance to the Kit Kat Restaurant. The Gaumont opened on 4 February 1937 with a Royal premiere of The Great Barrier.

In 1941 all assets of Gaumont British were acquired by the Rank Organisation.

== Odeon Haymarket (1962–1996) ==
Following declining audience numbers, the Gaumont Haymarket was closed on 10 June 1959, with Robert Taylor in The Hangman being the last film. A second gutting then took place, creating a single-level, basement cinema with 600 seats and office space created above. Access to the cinema was from the southern corner of the building, leading to a small foyer and then stairs down to the screen. The cinema was spaciously raked and distinctively decorated in an alternating series of gold and tan wall stripped wall coverings and had a 'honeycomb' ceiling of circular holes. The new cinema, called Odeon Haymarket, opened in 1962.

The Odeon Haymarket specialised in more up-market attractions, often for exclusive seasons. Films included Jacques Tati's Playtime, Franco Zeffirelli's Hamlet with Mel Gibson, and Hugh Hudson's and David Puttnam's Chariots of Fire.

== Closure ==
The cinema was closed in 1996 nominally for a refurbishment but later gutted to become a nightclub. Planning permission was granted on appeal on 27 April 2007 for a nightclub in the basement, but the landlords have struggled to let the space as it is restricted to D2 use but is too low for a modern cinema. On 12 August 2010 the permission was extended to 27 April 2012.

Odeon Panton Street (a different cinema, a short walk from Haymarket) was renamed Odeon Luxe Haymarket in 2019.
