= Dusolina Giannini =

American opera singer (1899–1986)

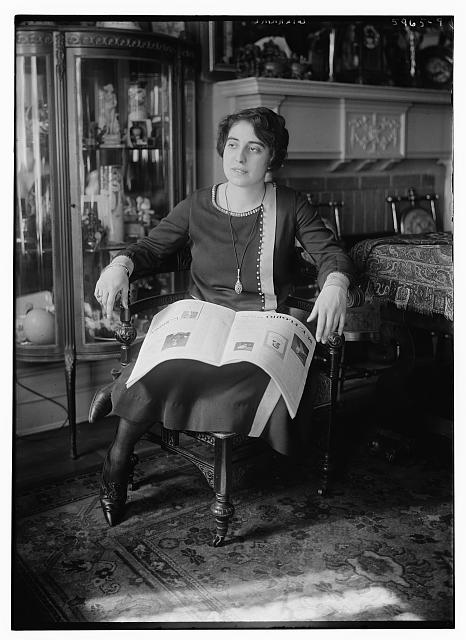
- Born: 19 December 1899; Philadelphia, Pennsylvania, United States
- Died: 29 June 1986 (aged 86); Zurich, Switzerland
- Other name: Dusolina Giannini Richter
- Occupations: Dramatic soprano; prima donna; opera singer; music teacher
- Spouse: Elmer Alan Richter (m. 1942; died 1974)
- Parents: Ferruccio Giannini (father); Antonietta Briglia Giannini (mother)
- Relatives: Vittorio Giannini (brother); Eufemia Giannini Gregory (sister); Margaret Giannini (cousin)

Dusolina Giannini (1899–1986) was an Italian-American dramatic soprano, prima donna, opera singer, music teacher, and member of the Giannini family.

== Early life and education ==
Dusolina Giannini was born on 19 December 1899 in Philadelphia, to Antonietta Briglia Giannini (1873–1934) and Ferruccio Giannini (1868–1948). Giannini's birth year is commonly miscited as 1902.

Giannini's mother, born in Marsicovetere, was a violinist. Giannini's father, born in Ponte d'Arbia, was an opera singer and tenor. Giannini had five siblings, three of which survived to adulthood. Her siblings included Eufemia Giannini Gregory (1895-1979), a voice teacher at the Curtis Institute of Music, and Vittorio Giannini (1903–1966), a composer. Giannini's paternal cousin was Margaret Giannini.

Giannini's first studied singing under her father, and later studied under Marcella Sembrich.

== Career ==
Giannini began in concert in 1923, appearing as a substitute to Anna Case in Manhattan. In 1924, Giannini appeared in London and Havana. In 1925, Giannini made her operatic debut in Hamburg as Aida.

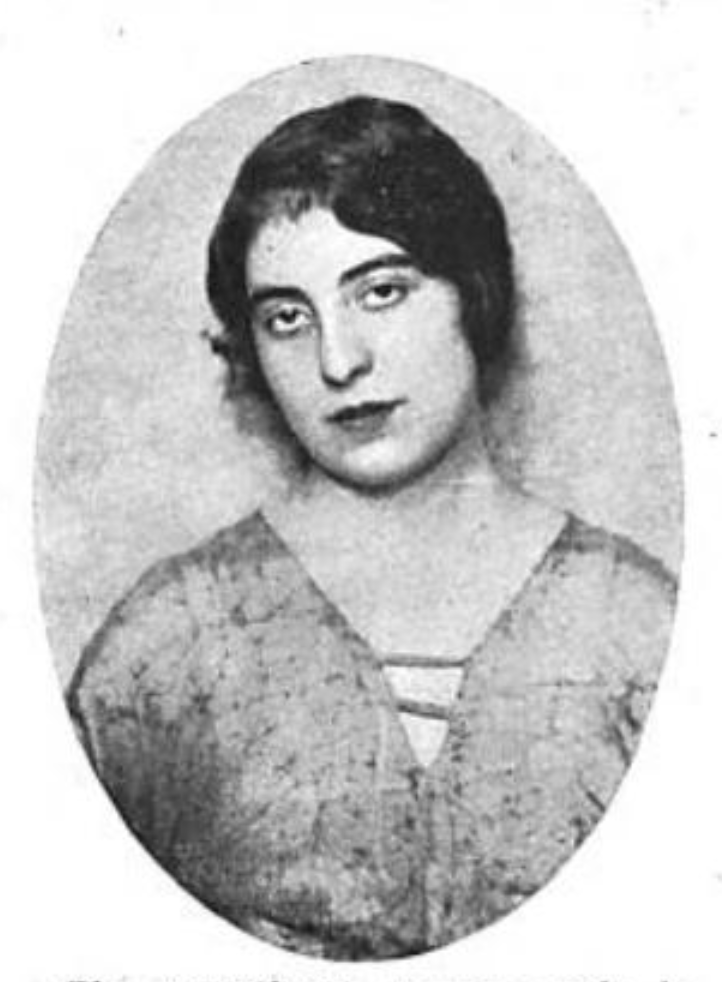
Giannini in 1924

She sang at the Salzburg Festival in 1934, as Donna Anna and Alice Ford, and made her debut at the Paris Opéra in 1936, as Donna Anna. In 1938, she created, in Hamburg, the role of Hester Prynne in The Scarlet Letter, an opera composed by her brother Vittorio Giannini.

She sang at the Metropolitan Opera from 1935 to 1942, also appearing at the Chicago City Opera Company (1938–42) and the San Francisco Opera (1939–43). She also took part in the first season of the New York City Opera in 1943, as Tosca. After the war, she continued appearing in Paris, London, Berlin, and Vienna.

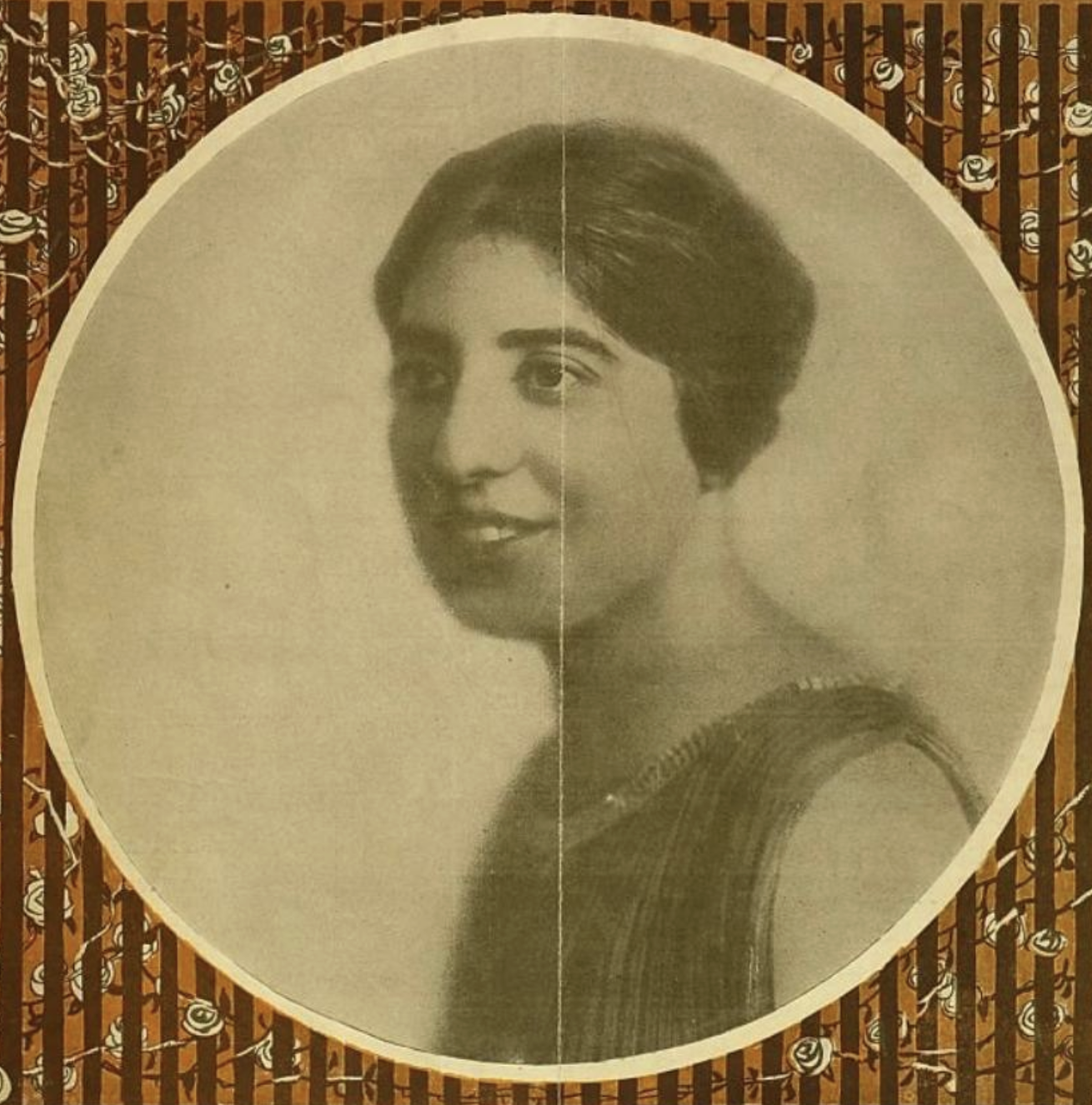
Giannini in 1924

In the 1960s Giannini retired from the opera, and became a music teacher.

=== Voice ===
Giannini's voice was a dramatic soprano, characterised by a strong temperament and fine musicianship. She can be heard on a complete recording of Aida from 1928, opposite Aureliano Pertile.

== Personal life and death ==
On the 26 December 1942, Giannini married Elmer Alan Richter (1888–1974) at her parents' home in Philadelphia.

Giannini died in Zurich on 29 June 1986 at the age of 86.

== Sources ==
- Le Guide de l'opéra, les indispensables de la musique, R. Mancini & J.J. Rouvereux, (Fayard, 1986), ISBN 2-213-01563-5
- Grove Music Online, Max de Schauensee, Oxford Press University, April 2008.
- Dusolina Giannini : [concert program], 1929, 1929
- Postcard: Dusolina Giannini - Desdemona : TOWN HALL, SYDNEY. / Direction: E.J. Gravestock
- Rasponi, Lanfranco (15 December 1979), "Con principio: Dusolina Giannini. (biography of American opera singer)", Opera News, v44, Metropolitan Opera Guild, Inc: 8 (4), ISSN 0030-3607
