= Margaret Giannini =

American physician (1921–2021)

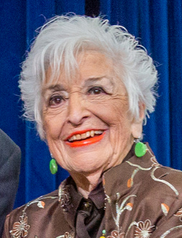
- Giannini at an awards event in 2018
- Born: Margaret Joan Giannini; May 27, 1921; Camden, New Jersey, U.S.
- Died: November 22, 2021 (aged 100); San Diego, California, U.S.
- Other names: Peg Giannini
- Occupation(s): Physician, medical researcher, government official
- Relatives: Vittorio Giannini (cousin), Dusolina Giannini (cousin)

Margaret Joan Giannini (May 27, 1921 – November 22, 2021) was an American physician and a specialist in assistive technology and rehabilitation. She was the first director of the National Institute of Disability Rehabilitation Research (NIDRR).

== Early life and education ==
Margaret Giannini was born in Camden, New Jersey, the daughter of Francesco (Francis) and Rose Antonia Giordano Giannini. Both of her parents were born in Italy. Composer Vittorio Giannini and his sister, singer Dusolina Giannini, were her older cousins. She attended Camden High School, Boston University and Temple University, and earned her medical degree in 1945 at Hahnemann Medical College and Hospital.

== Career ==
=== Medical career ===
Giannini served her internship at the New York Medical College, where she became a professor of pediatrics, with an early specialty in pediatric oncology. In 1950, after hearing the frustrations of her patients' families, she founded the Mental Retardation Institute, a multidisciplinary clinic to treat people with intellectual disabilities, including classrooms, dental care, and social work services. As the center's director, she raised funds, hired specialists, and oversaw research projects. The institute served as a model for research centers funded under Public Law 88–164. The Mental Retardation Institute is now the Westchester Institute for Human Development.

Giannini helped organize and lead the Association of University Centers on Disabilities (AUCD), and University Centers for Excellence in Developmental Disabilities Education, Research and Service (UCEDD). She was president of the American Association on Mental Deficiency, and the American Association of University Affiliate Programs. She was inter-regional advisor to the United Nations on disability and technology.

Giannini appeared in medical videos including The Seattle Foot (1980), Audiology (1984), and Environmental Medicine (1985). She co-wrote a manual, Choosing a Wheelchair System (1990). She also co-wrote the textbooks Neonatal Neurology (1981) and Behavioral Neurology in the Elderly (2001). Her scholarly articles appeared in journals including Clinical Prosthetics and Orthotics, the American Journal of Orthopsychiatry, and Cortex. She chaired the editorial board of the Journal of Rehabilitation Research and Development.

=== Presidential appointments and awards ===
Giannini became director of the National Institute of Handicapped Research (now NIDRR) in 1980, appointed by Jimmy Carter. In 1981, she became director of the Veterans Administration's Rehabilitation Research and Development Service, during the Reagan administration; she received a Distinguished Service Award for her "pioneering and innovative efforts in the disability field", presented to her by Harold Russell. She retired from the Department of Veterans Affairs in 1991. In 2001 she became the Principal Deputy Assistant Secretary for Aging, appointed by George W. Bush. She became Director of the Office on Disability when the office was launched in 2002.

In 1960, Giannini was named Woman of the Year by the American Women's Medical Association. The Seton Hill College Alumnae Association awarded Giannini the Elizabeth Seton Medal in 1983. In 1987, she won the Goldenson Award for Technology from United Cerebral Palsy, and the Everest & Jennings Distinguished Lecturer Award from the Rehabilitation Engineering Society of North America. In 2018, she was the first recipient of the Award for Lifetime Achievement in Advancing Community Living, presented to her by Health and Human Services Secretary Alex Azar at an event marking the fortieth anniversary of the NIDILRR (formerly NIDRR).

== Personal life ==
Giannini married fellow physician Louis Joseph Salerno in New York City in 1948. They had four sons, Salerno died in 1988.

She died at home in San Diego, California on November 22, 2021, at the age of 100.
