= Irwin Swack =

American composer (1916–2006)

Irwin Swack (November 8, 1916 – January 2, 2006) was an American composer of contemporary classical music from West Salem, Ohio.

He held degrees from the Cleveland Institute of Music (where he studied violin, graduating with a B.M. in 1939), the Juilliard School, Northwestern University (master's degree), and Columbia University (doctorate). He studied with Henry Cowell (at Columbia University), Gunther Schuller (at Tanglewood), Vittorio Giannini (at Juilliard), Paul Creston (at Columbia University), and Normand Lockwood. Swack also worked as an assistant professor of music at Jacksonville State College. His music was recorded on the Centaur, CRS, Opus One, and Living Artist Recordings labels.

His music is published by Carl Fischer, Shawnee Press, Theodore Presser, and Galaxy Music.

His last residence was in Bellmore, New York.

== Awards and grants ==
- ASCAP Standard Awards
- Ford Foundation grant
- Meet-the-Composer grant
- New York State Council on the Arts grant

== Works ==
- Duets for Violin and Viola
- Fantasie Concertante, string orchestra
- Profiles, clarinet, violin and cello
- Sonata for Flute and Piano
- String Quartet no. 1
- String Quartet no. 2
- String Quartet no. 3
- String Quartet no. 4
- String Quartet no. 5
- Symphony no. 1
- Symphony no. 2
- The Visions of Isaiah, mixed choir and orchestra
