= Maude Nugent =

American singer and composer (1873 or 1874–1958)

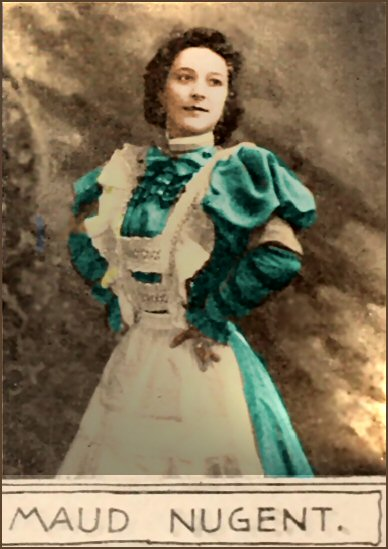
Nugent, c. 1897 from a theater magazine ad

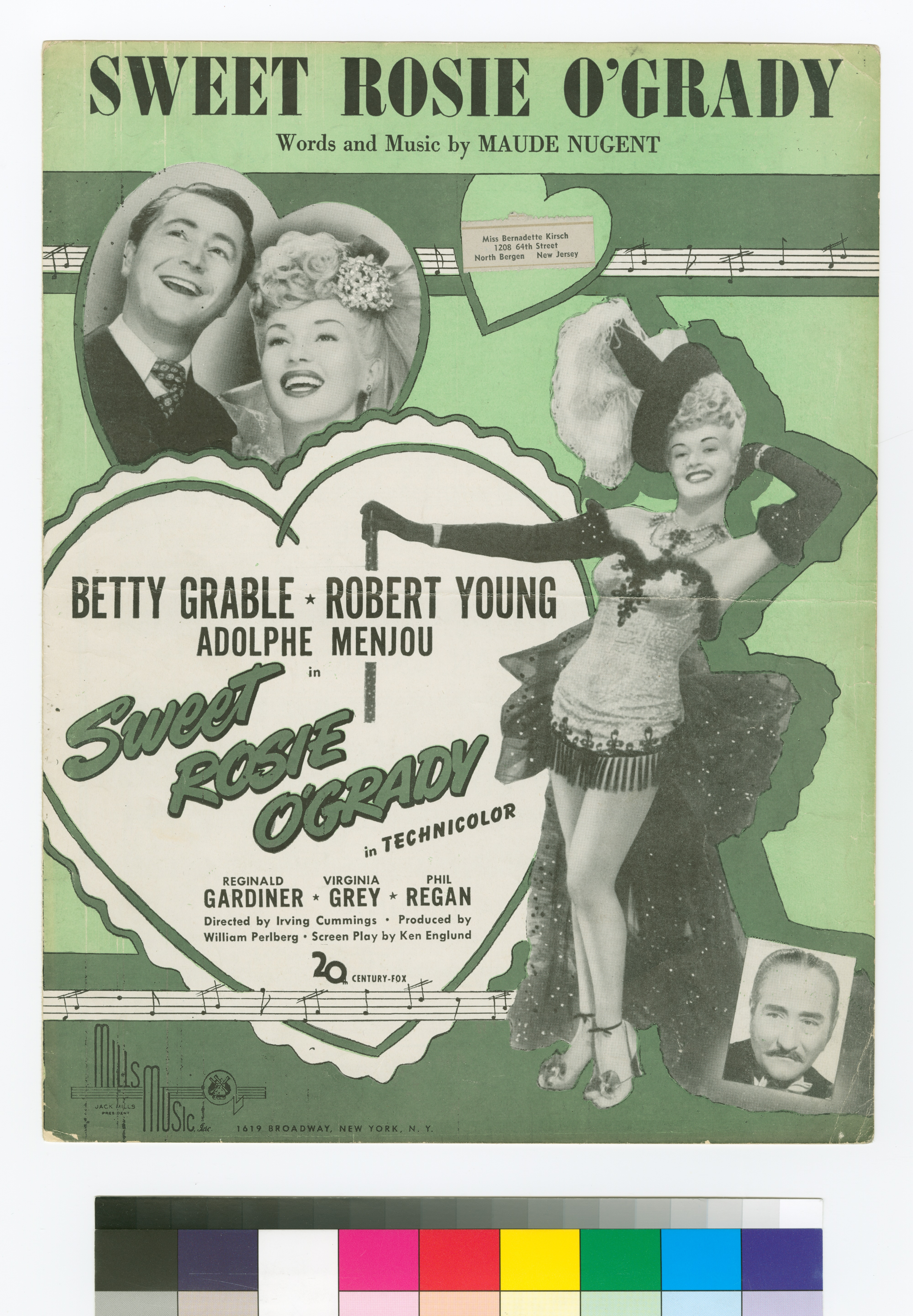
The cover of sheet music for the song from the 1943 movie

Maude Nugent (January 12, 1873 or 1874 – June 3, 1958) was an American singer and composer.

== Biography ==
Maude Nugent was born in Brooklyn, New York. She became a vaudeville singer, singing at venues like The Abbey and Tony Pastor's.

In 1896, she composed and wrote the lyrics to "Sweet Rosie O'Grady", which became one of the most popular waltz standards of the time. The song was initially rejected when she tried to sell it to Tin Pan Alley publisher Joseph W. Stern & Co. Stern's partner Edward Marks recounted that they changed their minds as soon as she left their office to market it elsewhere, and he chased her down the street to make an offer. The sheet music for the song sold over a million copies. In 1899, it was recorded by Lil Hawthorne for Berliner Gramophone. It was the main song in the 1943 Betty Grable film Sweet Rosie O'Grady.

Nugent continued to compose songs for a number of years, but none approached the success of "Rosie O'Grady". Nugent performed her own songs, introducing many of them to audiences in this manner. Occasionally she collaborated with her husband, fellow-songwriter William Jerome.

Nugent retired from performing when she was 28 in order to raise a family; however, she continued to write music. In the 1940s and 1950s, "Gay Nineties" revues came into vogue and Nugent began to perform again on television, including The Ed Sullivan Show.

She died June 3, 1958, in New York.

The song "Sweet Rosie O'Grady" has a few lines in the musical Hello, Dolly!.
