= Alexander Heinemann =

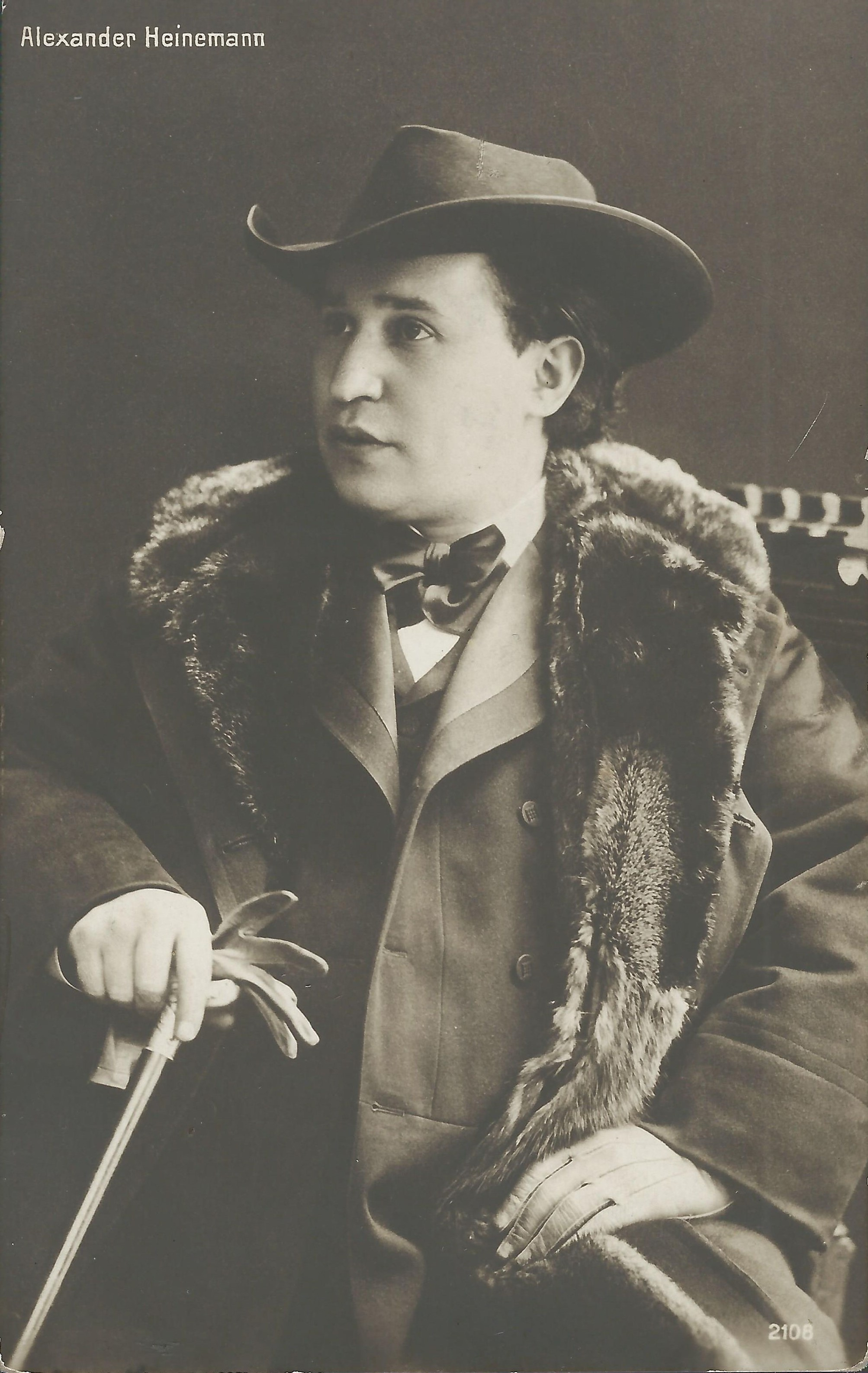
- Alexander Heinemann around 1907

Background information
- Born: May 26, 1873; Berlin
- Died: October 26, 1918 (aged 45) Berlin
- Genres: Lied
- Occupation: Singer
- Instrument: Baritone

Alexander Heinemann (1873 – 1918) was a German baritone who specialized in Lieder and Oratorio. He recorded a large number of phonographs between 1908 and 1913. He toured the United States in 1910 and performed at the White House for President Taft.

== Career ==
Heinemann learned to play piano, violin and trombone in his youth, before he started his formal education as a singer at the Stern Conservatory in Berlin. He started to perform in public in 1895, specializing in Oratorio and Lieder. Between 1908 and 1913 he recorded many phonographs for the record companies Berliner Gramophone, Odeon Records, His Master's Voice and Edison-Amberol.

Between 1906 and 1910, Heinemann toured Europe, including Stockholm, London and Vienna. Between 1910 and 1913 he toured the United States. In 1910 and 1911 he performed at the Sunday night concerts of the Metropolitan Opera and sang at the White House for President Taft.
