= Mary Lynn Twombly =

American composer

Mary Lynn Twombly Aprahamian (born 8 January 1935) is an American composer, conductor, and pianist who publishes under the name Mary Lynn Twombly.

== Life and career ==
Twombly was born in New York. From 1952 to 1954, she studied with Meyer Kupferman at Sarah Lawrence College; from 1954 to 1958 with Vittorio Giannini at the Manhattan School of Music; and from 1971 to 1972, she studied electronic music with Elias Tanenbaum. In 1973 she attended music workshops at Fairleigh Dickinson University.

Twombly received the Harold Bauer Piano Award from the Manhattan School of Music in 1957. She received at least one commission from the Little Orchestra Society in 1960, possibly for Alice in Wonderland, which was published and performed in New York that year. She conducted and composed music for films and recordings for Weston Woods Studios from 1966 to 1967. She was a member of the American Society of Composers, Authors, and Publishers (ASCAP).

== Works ==
Twombly's compositions include:

=== Ballet ===
- Alice in Wonderland (with optional narrator; choreography by Herta Payson)

=== Operetta ===
- Little Match Girl
- Who Are The Blind?

=== Orchestra ===
- Symphonic Statements (piano and string orchestra)

=== Vocal ===
- Eternal Word (narrator, chorus and orchestra)
- Songs of Christmas (chorus)
