= Walter Gibbons (theatre owner) =

English theatre owner

Sir Walter Gibbons KBE
- Born: 14 May 1871; Wolverhampton, England
- Died: 22 October 1933 (aged 62); London, England
- Occupations: Theatre owner, cinema pioneer, performer
- Years active: 1890s–1933

Sir Walter Gibbons, KBE (14 May 1871 – 22 October 1933) was an English theatre proprietor who owned a number of music halls at the beginning of the twentieth century. Along with Oswald Stoll, he led the employers' side in the Music Hall Strike of 1907, which was settled broadly in favour of the artists, musicians and stage hands who were demanding better wages and conditions.

== Life ==
Born in Wolverhampton, he worked in a local nail factory and in an accountant's office, before joining the Calder O'Berne Opera Company, and then working as a music hall singer. After moving to London, he acquired an Urban Bioscope projector and, in 1898, launched the Anglo-American Bio-Tableaux, a variety film show that initially concentrated on news subjects.

In 1900 he produced the Phono-Bio-Tableaux, a series of films synchronized to phonograph cylinders that presented famous music hall artists such as Vesta Tilley, Lil Hawthorne, Alec Hurley and G. H. Chirgwin. The Lil Hawthorne film survives. Gibbons experimented with artificial lighting and, in 1901, was reported to have a London studio and plant capable of processing and dispatching a film in sixty-five minutes. He is also reported to have sent cameramen out to film the later stages of the Boer War, including C. Rider Noble.

On the death of his father-in-law, G. Adney Payne, he succeeded to the directorship of the London Syndicate Halls. From 1903, he greatly increased his holdings by buying suburban and provincial halls and turning them into variety theatres. He also attempted to corner the market in leading performers by offering them increased salaries, but tough contracts. He opened the London Palladium as a flagship of his music hall empire in 1910, by which time he owned some 40 music halls, half of them in London. Gibbons severed his connection with the Palladium in 1912.

During the First World War, he was active in the Royal Army Service Corps as a Lieutenant-Colonel, and later organised food and emergency supplies during strikes affecting the railway system.

He was knighted for public services in the 1920 New Year Honours List.

In 1928, he returned as managing director of the General Theatres Corporation which initiated a programme of cine-variety at the theatre. Within a few months, a boardroom wrangle led to his resignation. His considerable fortune was dissipated on other theatrical projects, leading to bankruptcy shortly before his death in London in 1933, aged 62.

He was married twice: to Nellie Payne, who died in 1911, and then to Doris Lee; they were later divorced.
