= John Woods Duke =

American musician

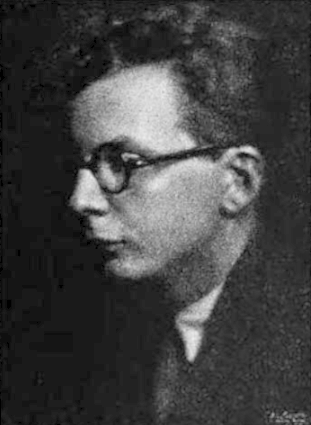
- Born: July 30, 1899; Cumberland, Maryland, US
- Died: October 26, 1984 (aged 85); Northampton, Massachusetts, US
- Education: Peabody Conservatory
- Occupations: Composer, pianist
- Spouse: Dorothy Macon (m. 1922)
- Children: 2

John Woods Duke (July 30, 1899 – October 26, 1984) was an American composer and pianist. He is best known for his large output of art songs.

== Biography ==
John Woods Duke was born in Cumberland, Maryland on July 30, 1899, the oldest child in a large musical family. After teaching him to read music at an early age and starting him on piano lessons at age 11, Duke's mother (a talented singer herself) enrolled him in the Cumberland, MD Allegany Academy. By age 16 he had won a three-year scholarship to the Peabody Conservatory in Baltimore.

While at Peabody, Duke studied composition and theory under Gustav Strube and piano with Harold Randolph (whose own tutors had included Hans von Bülow, Clara Schumann, and Franz Liszt). He graduated in 1918, and, in the midst of wartime, volunteered his services to the Student Army Training Corps at Columbia University.

Duke stayed in New York City after the war. He debuted as a concert pianist in Aeolian Hall and wrote his first art song. Within a few years he began playing as a soloist with the New York Philharmonic. He married Dorothy Macon in 1922, with whom he had two children and who collaborated with him as a librettist on several art songs.

In 1923, Duke accepted a position on the music faculty at Smith College in Northampton, Massachusetts. He gained a full professorship at Smith in 1936, and remained at the institution until 1967 when he received the Peabody Alumni Association Award for Distinguished Service in the field of music following his retirement. His prodigious output of art songs continued, including such well-known pieces as "Loveliest of Trees", "I've Dreamed of Sunsets" and "Lullabye". Pursuing compositional studies, Duke took a year's sabbatical in 1929 to work with Nadia Boulanger in Paris and Artur Schnabel in Berlin. Returning to the United States, he spent a summer at the Yaddo artists' colony in Saratoga Springs, New York.

Professor Duke's lectures, particularly those on his own work (which would eventually total approximately 260 art songs) became very popular. His pieces were later selected for inclusion in such classic anthologies as Music for the Voice by Sergius Kagen and The Singer's Repertoire by Berton Coffin.

Donald Gramm notably sang John Duke's settings of Edwin Arlington Robinson narrative poems, Three Poems by Edwin Arlington Robinson.

Although Duke's work covered a wide range of styles, it showed the particular influence of 19th-century German Lieder. Like those who influenced him, Duke had a passion for setting poems in his native language to music. Though he himself trained in piano, John Duke wrote almost all of his compositions for voice. When asked why, the composer replied, "I think it is because of my belief that vocal utterance is the basis of music's mystery."

He died at Cooley Dickinson Hospital in Northampton on October 26, 1984.
