= Dry those fair, those crystal eyes =

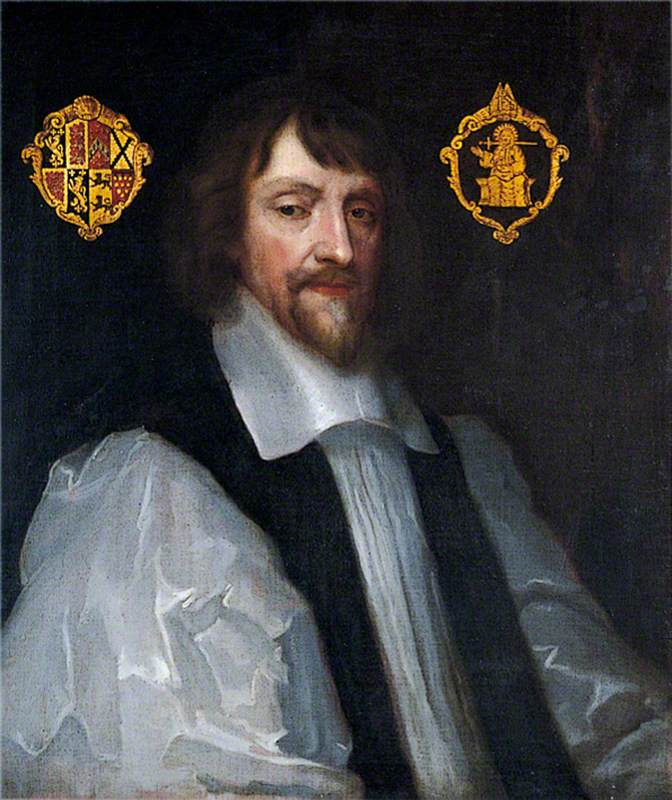
Henry King

"Dry those fair, those chrystal eyes" is a sonnet by Henry King (1591-1669), Bishop of Chichester. The poem (with modern spelling) was set to music by the English composer Edward Elgar in 1899, published in the Souvenir of the Charing Cross Hospital Bazaar, with its first performance at the Royal Albert Hall on 21 June 1899. The poem was set for mixed voice choir (SATB) by the organist John E. West.

== Lyrics ==
Sonnet: DRY THOSE FAIR, THOSE CHRYSTAL EYES

Dry those fair, those chrystal eyes,
Which like growing fountains rise
To drown their banks. Griefs sullen brooks
Would better flow in furrow’d looks.
Thy lovely face was never meant
To be the shoar of discontent.
Then clear those watrish starres again
Which else portend a lasting rain;

Lest the clouds which settle there
Prolong my Winter all the Year:
And the example others make
In love with sorrow for thy sake.

Elgar's version:

Dry those fair, those crystal eyes,
Which like growing fountains rise
To drown their banks : Grief’s sullen brooks
Would better flow in furrow’d looks;
Thy lovely face was never meant
To be the shore of discontent.
Then clear those wat'rish stars again,
Which else portend a lasting rain;

Lest the clouds which settle there
Prolong my winter all the year,
And thy example others make
In love with sorrow for thy sake.

== Recordings ==
- "The Unknown Elgar" includes "Dry those fair, those crystal eyes" performed by Teresa Cahill (soprano), with Barry Collett (piano).
- Songs and Piano Music by Edward Elgar has "Dry those fair, those crystal eyes" performed by Peter Savidge (baritone), with David Owen Norris (piano).
- Elgar: Complete Songs for Voice & Piano Amanda Roocroft (soprano), Reinild Mees (piano)
