= Vittorio Giannini =

American composer (1903–1966)

Vittorio Giannini (October 19, 1903 – November 28, 1966) was an American neoromantic composer of operas, songs, symphonies, and band works, and member of the Giannini family.

== Life and work ==
Giannini, who was of Italian heritage, was born in Philadelphia on October 19, 1903. His father, Ferruccio, was born in Ponte d'Arbia, Tuscany, and his mother, Antonietta (née Briglia), was born in Marsicovetere, Basilicata; both immigrated to the U.S. in the 1880s. He began as a violinist under the tutelage of his mother; he would go on to study violin and composition at the Milan Conservatory on scholarship, and then to take his graduate degree at the Juilliard School. He returned to Juilliard to teach, moving on to the Manhattan School of Music, the Juilliard School of Music, and the Curtis Institute of Music. His students included Herbie Hancock, Nicolas Flagello, David Amram, Mark Bucci, Alfred Reed, Anthony Iannaccone, M. William Karlins, Irwin Swack, John Corigliano, Adolphus Hailstork, Rolande Maxwell Young, Thomas Pasatieri, Avraham Sternklar, Mary Lynn Twombly, Michele Levin, Jórunn Viðar, and Nancy Bloomer Deussen. Giannini was the founder and first president of the North Carolina School of the Arts in 1965, which he envisioned as a type of Juilliard of the South, bringing artists such as cellist Irving Klein and violinist Ruggiero Ricci to teach there. He remained there until his death in 1966.

Giannini's father, Ferruccio Giannini, was an opera singer and founder of the Verdi Opera House in Philadelphia. Vittorio's two sisters were celebrated singers as well. Euphemia Giannini Gregory taught Voice at the Curtis Institute for 40 years counting among her students the opera divas Anna Moffo and Judith Blegen. Dusolina Giannini was a dramatic soprano and prima donna who performed throughout Europe, until moving to the United States to sing with the Metropolitan Opera, and finally to spend her remaining years teaching. Dusolina was a pivotal figure in the success of some of her brother's operas. Her career was already well underway when she took the lead in the 1934 premiere (Munich) of his first opera, Lucedia, as well as the lead (Hester Prynne) in his 1937 opera based on Nathaniel Hawthorne's The Scarlet Letter (Hamburg, 1938). Both operas enjoyed successful premieres, but have never been produced again. His most successful opera proved to be a 1950 adaptation of The Taming of the Shrew.

Giannini's partnership with poet Karl Flaster was a fruitful one. In addition to his work on The Scarlet Letter, Flaster was the librettist for several of Giannini's operas, including Lucedia and The Harvest. Flaster also provided the lyrics for dozens of Giannini's art songs, including several that have become staples of the song recital repertoire, most notably "Tell Me, Oh Blue Blue Sky," recorded by Mario Lanza, Leonard Warren, and others.

His operas and songs brought Giannini his initial success during the 1930s and early 1940s. (Beauty and the Beast was commissioned by CBS in 1938--the first opera composed specifically for radio.) He then began to focus on instrumental works, many of a diverting nature. Some of these works show a fondness for infusing Baroque forms with a romantic warmth. During his last few years he revealed a more serious side to his creative personality, broadening his tonal language with greater harmonic dissonance and melodic chromaticism, in the service of greater expressive depth, all within a romantic aesthetic framework. Among those considered his greatest works are the vocal monodrama The Medead, Psalm 130 for double-bass or cello and orchestra, and his Symphony No. 5. In addition to his seven symphonies (of which only the last five were numbered), he composed 15 operas and several concerti, as well as music for chorus, solo piano, and chamber ensembles. During the last eight years of his life he composed five works for wind band and, ironically, they are his most widely performed compositions today. One, his Symphony No. 3 (1958), has become a staple of the band repertoire. Despite the wide range of his output, little of his other music is in the active repertoire. However, today a representative sample of all aspects of his work is available on recording.

Giannini died in New York City on November 28, 1966, at the age of 63.

== Selected works ==
- Stabat mater (1922), SATB and orchestra
- "Tell Me, O Blue, Blue Sky" (1927), voice/piano
- String Quartet (1930)
- Suite (1931), orchestra
- Piano Quintet (1932)
- Lucedia (1934), opera, libretto K. Flaster
- Piano Concerto (1935)
- Symphony ‘In memoriam Theodore Roosevelt’ (1935)
- Organ Concerto (1937)
- Triptych (1937), soprano choir and strings
- IBM Symphony (1937), orchestra
- Requiem (1937), choir and orchestra
- The Scarlet Letter (1938), opera, libretto Flaster after Nathaniel Hawthorne
- Beauty and the Beast (1938), radio opera in one act
- Blennerhassett (1939), radio opera in one act
- Sonata No. 1 (1940), violin and piano
- "Sing to My Heart a Song" (c. 1942), voice/piano
- Sonata No. 2 (1944), violin and piano
- Concerto Grosso (1946)
- Variations on a Cantus firmus (1947), piano
- The Taming of the Shrew (1950), opera, libretto by Giannini and D. Fee after Shakespeare
- Symphony No. 1 (1950)
- Divertimento No. 1 (1953), orchestra
- Symphony No. 2 (1955), orchestra
- Prelude and Fugue (1955), string orchestra
- Fantasia for Band (1963), band
- Preludium and Allegro (1958), symphonic band
- Symphony No. 3 (1958), symphonic band
- Symphony No. 4 (1959), orchestra
- The Medead (1960), soprano and orchestra
- The Harvest (1961), opera, libretto Flaster
- Divertimento No. 2 (1961), orchestra
- Antigone (1962), soprano and orchestra
- Psalm cxxx (1963), bass/cello and orchestra
- Sonata for Flute and Piano (1964), flute/piano
- Variations and Fugue (1964), symphonic band
- Symphony No. 5 (1965)
- Servant of Two Masters (1966), opera, libretto B. Stambler, after C. Goldoni
