= Charles D'Almaine =

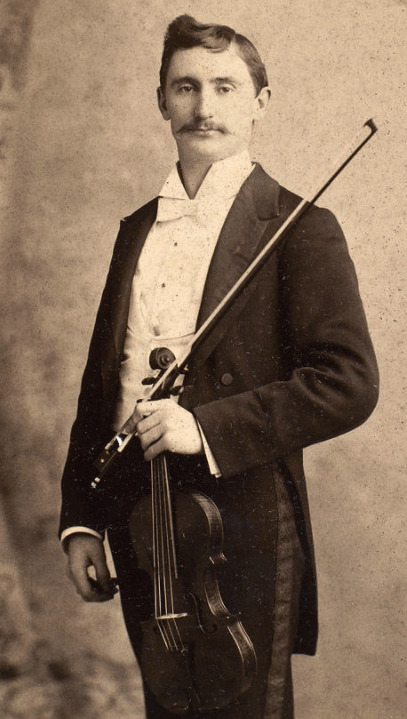
- Charles D'Almaine in 1900

Background information
- Born: June 13, 1871; Kingston upon Hull
- Died: June 17, 1943 (aged 72); Newark, New Jersey
- Genres: classical, popular, old-time
- Occupation(s): violinist, chiropractor
- Years active: 1890s–1920s
- Labels: Edison Records, Berliner Gramophone, Victor Records, Columbia Records
- Formerly of: Len Spencer

Charles D'Almaine (/dælmeɪn/; June 13, 1871 – June 17, 1943) was an American violinist with the New York Metropolitan Opera, a chiropractor, and a pioneer recording artist.

== Biography ==
Charles D'Almaine was born in Kingston upon Hull on June 13, 1871. He grew up an orphan in the London area. At some point he came to the United States and played first violin at the Grand Opera House in Chicago in the 1890s.

He married his second wife, Cornelia Helen (d. September 25, 1933, known as "Helen") on December 24, 1897. After his marriage he stayed in Chicago a short time to teach violin students. In 1898 he relocated to New York City, the only major recording center of the time.

One of the earliest violinists to make recordings, D'Almaine's first ("Miserere") was recorded in 1899 and released on Edison cylinder #7324. He went to the Berliner Gramophone studios in January and February 1900, where at least 13 of his recordings were issued. When a standing orchestra was established at the Edison studios, D'Almaine was made concertmaster.

Beginning his association with the Victor company in 1901, he eventually became concertmaster of the house unit, the Victor Orchestra. He also made recordings for Columbia, where sometimes the pseudonym Charles Gordon was used. His musical duties outside the recording studio included positions at the Metropolitan Opera House. In addition to performing, he also made several violins.

In April 1914 he and his wife Helen enrolled at the Palmer College of Chiropractic in Davenport, Iowa, where he obtained his Doctor of Chiropractic. He made his final recordings for Pathé Records. He and his wife operated chiropractic practices in New York City and Newark, New Jersey.

In addition to his medical duties, he continued his musical career. He was second-violinist with the New York Metropolitan Opera orchestra. for the 1921–1922 season, and was employed there until the 1924–1925 season in the violin section. He was released, having spent 17 years at the Met, when a new conductor brought in many new players he was familiar with. D'Almaine spent the following summer season with the Arthur Pryor band. His last professional musical activity was to tour with Harry Lauder, after which he abandoned music to devote himself to his chiropractic practice. On June 17, 1943 he died, childless, in Newark, and was cremated.

== Style and recordings ==
Many of D'Almaine's recordings used the Stroh violin, and he was the first to record using that instrument. In addition to classical pieces and straight renditions of popular songs, his output of fiddle-tunes was significant to the genre, often because of Edison's penchant for marketing to rural markets. D'Almaine was the fiddle player on Len Spencer's immensely popular "Arkansas Traveler", as well as the first to record "The Irish Washerwoman" (1904), "Flowers of Edinburgh" (1905), and "Tom and Jerry" (1905). He also made novelty records such as "Donkey and Driver", which includes sound effects generated on his instrument. As the violin soloist of choice for Victor Records and Edison Records, D'Almaine's output was prolific. His wide repertoire and varied duties demanded a formidable technique, which he rarely got to fully display; the most virtuosic of his "classical" recordings is probably his 1906 rendition of Jean-Delphin Alard's "Brindisi-Valse" for violin and piano, opus 49 no. 16 (recorded with orchestral accompaniment and released as Victor 31542). He also recorded for Berliner Gramophone, Columbia Records, and other, smaller companies. Among his most popular recordings were "Shepherd's Dance", a 1902 release on cylinder for Edison, and "Medley of Old-Time Reels", a 1906 release on a 12-inch Victor disc.
