= Charles Leggett =

English cornetist

Sergeant Charles Leggett (20 September 1874 – 29 November 1934) was a Brighton-born cornetist who became known as "The World's Finest Cornet Soloist," and who was the favorite cornet soloist of King Edward VII.

He joined the Scots Guards Regimental Band a year after first hearing them at the Hove Exhibition in 1890, rising to become Band-Sergeant of the Scots Guards, and Principal Professor of Cornet at Kneller Hall of the Royal Military School of Music.

He was renowned in his day as the world's finest cornet soloist, and performed often at Buckingham Palace and Marlborough House for King Edward VII, who especially prized his rendition of "Softly Awakes My Heart," from Samson and Delilah. This is recorded on a Rena Double-Face Record (1266) as "Cornet Solo. By Sergt. Leggett. BAND OF H.M. SCOTS GUARDS. Conducted by Mr. F. W. Wood." He also recorded Luigi Arditi's Il Bacio in 1905.

He was one of the first musicians hired by the BBC, in 1927, and stayed with them until his death, becoming principal cornet, deputy conductor and general supervisor of the BBC Wireless Military Band. Various recordings of him with the Orchestra are extant.

He lived at 87 Melody Road, Wandsworth.

== Reception ==
A 1927 review in The Gramophone noted that "Charles Leggett, needless to say, plays cornet solos of Love's old sweet song and Oh that we two were maying, as almost only he can play the cornet." A 1911 review in The Music Hall and Theatre Review called him a "clever cornet player".

In 1930, a review in The Musical Times praised Leggett's turn as a conductor:

Among the very best of recent military band records is that of Dan Godfrey's arrangement of Elgar's ‘ Wand of Youth’ Suite No. 2, played by the Decca Military Band conducted by Charles Leggett. This is first-rate from start to finish. The music stands transcription extraordinarily well, the playing is full of life and colour, and the recording beautifully clear.

== Legacy ==
His name lives on in the Professor Charles Leggett Award. The Leggett Award of £5,000 is administered by the Musicians' Benevolent Fund for "outstanding brass and woodwind players".

He was buried with full military honours in Wandsworth Cemetery.
