= Lil Hawthorne =

American actress

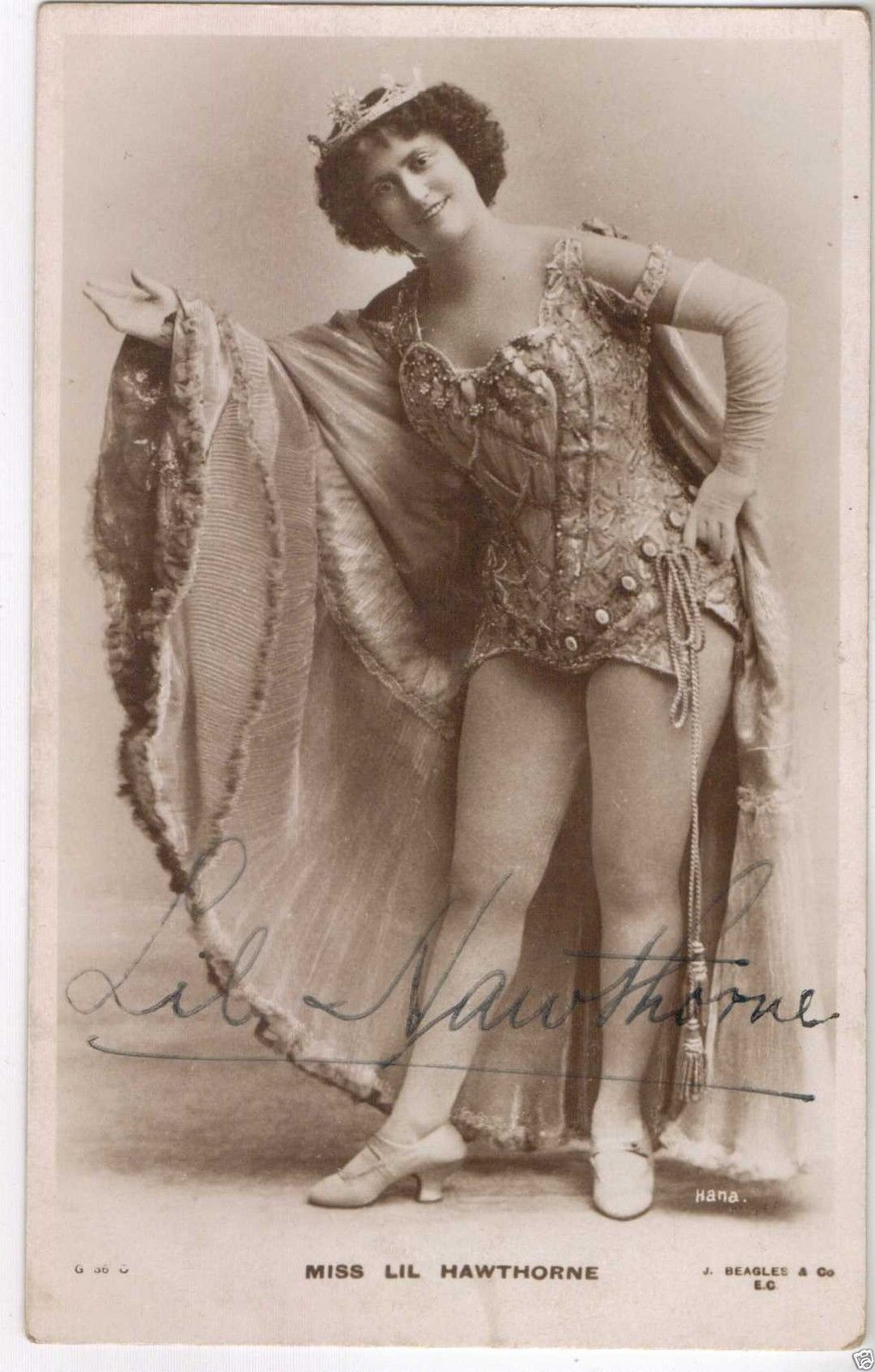
Lil Hawthorne

Lil Hawthorne (4 July 1877 – 22 March 1926) was an American-born British stage beauty, music hall performer and pantomime Principal Boy. In 1910, Hawthorne was involved in bringing Dr. Crippen to justice for the murder of his wife, Cora Henrietta Crippen, whom she had regarded as a good friend prior to her death.

== Early years ==
Born in Nashville, Illinois, as Lillian Hawthorne, she was one of four daughters of New Orleans estate agent Tazwell Wolfe (known as Hawthorne) and his wife Adrianna or Ada née Rogers, a farmer's daughter from Pontotoc, Mississippi. In 1889 aged 12 Lilian Hawthorne was cast in the role of a small boy in the comic opera Paola after which she and her younger sister Adelaide joined the theatrical company, The Bostonians, for whom they appeared in The Knickerbockers, Robin Hood, and The Ogallalas. In 1892 they played Leila and Fleta in Iolanthe with Henry Dixey's company at Palmer's Theatre. She started her variety career in America at the age of 14, as part of the song and dance trio, "The Hawthorne Sisters," with her sisters Eleanor and Adelaide (1892–1898). She performed with her sisters in Boston and New York before transferring to England, making her first appearance in London at the Palace Theatre in 1896, singing Leslie Stuart's popular song, "Willow Pattern Plate".

== Career ==
After her sisters' marriage and retirement, Hawthorne remained in the United Kingdom where she soon became popular in music halls all over the country. She made the first of many appearances in pantomime at the Empire Palace Theatre, Edinburgh in 1898. Hawthorne's repertoire of songs included 'Lucy Loo', 'Tessie, You are the Only, Only, Only' and 'Mamie May,' all of which she recorded, as well as 'Kitty Mahone' and 'Don't Cry Little Girl, Don't Cry'.

In 1899, she married John Edward Nash (1863–1934), who became her manager. Also in 1899 she recorded the song "Sweet Rosie O'Grady" (written by Maude Nugent) for Berliner Gramophone and "I'll Be Your Sweetheart". In 1900 she starred in Walter Gibbon's Anglo-American Bio-Tableaux film Kitty Mahone. She was the Principal Boy in the pantomimes Puss in Boots (1903–1904) and Sleeping Beauty (1904–1905), both at the Prince's Theatre in Bristol. On 6 December 1909 Hawthorne topped the bill at the opening night of the Hippodrome Theatre in Bishop Auckland.

== Dr. Crippen ==
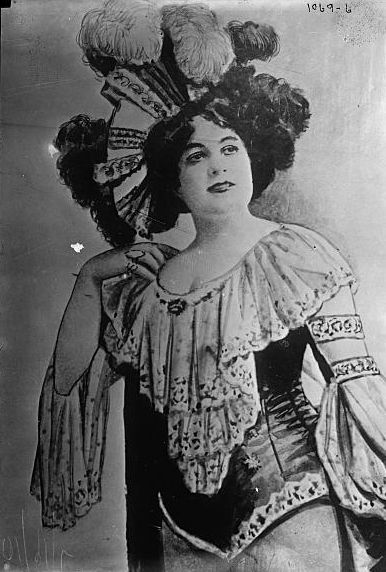
Belle Elmore – wife of Dr. Crippen

Hawthorne was a close friend of Cora Henrietta Crippen (née Corrine Turner and stage name Belle Elmore), the estranged wife and murder victim of Hawley Harvey Crippen. She and Elmore were members of the Music Hall Ladies' Guild. Police first heard of Elmore's disappearance from her friend, strongwoman Kate Williams, better known as Vulcana, but began to take the matter more seriously when asked to investigate by Hawthorne and her husband, who were personal friends of Scotland Yard Superintendent Frank Froest. They were able to prove that, despite Crippen's assertion to the contrary, his wife had not died in America.

As they lost professional engagements due to appointments with the police and the nervous strain Hawthorne suffered because of these and giving evidence at the trial, on 7 April 1911 HM Treasury authorised the payment of £100 in respect of expenses incurred and loss sustained by the couple in connection with the case of Rex v. Crippen.

In about 1915 Hawthorne and her husband finally left Britain and returned to America to Manhattan Beach. After various business enterprises including beach catering and owning a garage her husband found a new career in writing film screenplays.

Lil Hawthorne died of heart trouble in 1926 aged 49.
