= Louise Tunison =

American composer and organist (1872–1899)

Clara Louise Tunison (September 22, 1872 – May 21, 1899) was an American composer and organist, who is best known for composing songs which she published under the name Louise Tunison.

Tunison was born in New Jersey to Edward and Emily A. Tunison.

== Career ==
Her song "Memories" was sung on Broadway by Dorothy Morton in the 1899 production of An Arabian Girl and 40 Thieves at the Herald Square Theatre. The same year, the music and lyrics to "Forget Me Not," "Memories," and "'Twas But a Dream" were published in the New York Journal newspaper. "Twas But a Dream" was performed in vaudeville shows. "Dying Rose" and "Song of a Heart" were produced on piano rolls by the Aeolian Company, and "Song of a Heart" was recorded on Victor 31692.

== Discography ==
Her songs were published by T. B. Harms & Co. They include:

- "Dying Rose"
- "Forget Me Not"
- "Good Night"
- "Memories"
- "Next Summer"
- "Song of a Heart"
- "'Twas But a Dream"

== Death ==
Tunison died of heart disease at age 26 in New York City on May 21, 1899.
