= Berliner Gramophone =

First disc record label

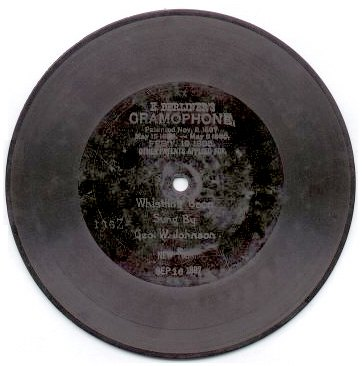
1897 Berliner Gramophone Record by George W. Johnson

Berliner Gramophone was an American record label which was the first and for nearly ten years the only disc record label in the world. Its records were played on Emile Berliner's invention, the Gramophone, which competed with the wax cylinder–playing phonographs that were more common in the 1890s and could record. Its discs were identified with an etched-in "E. Berliner's Gramophone" as the logo.

== History ==
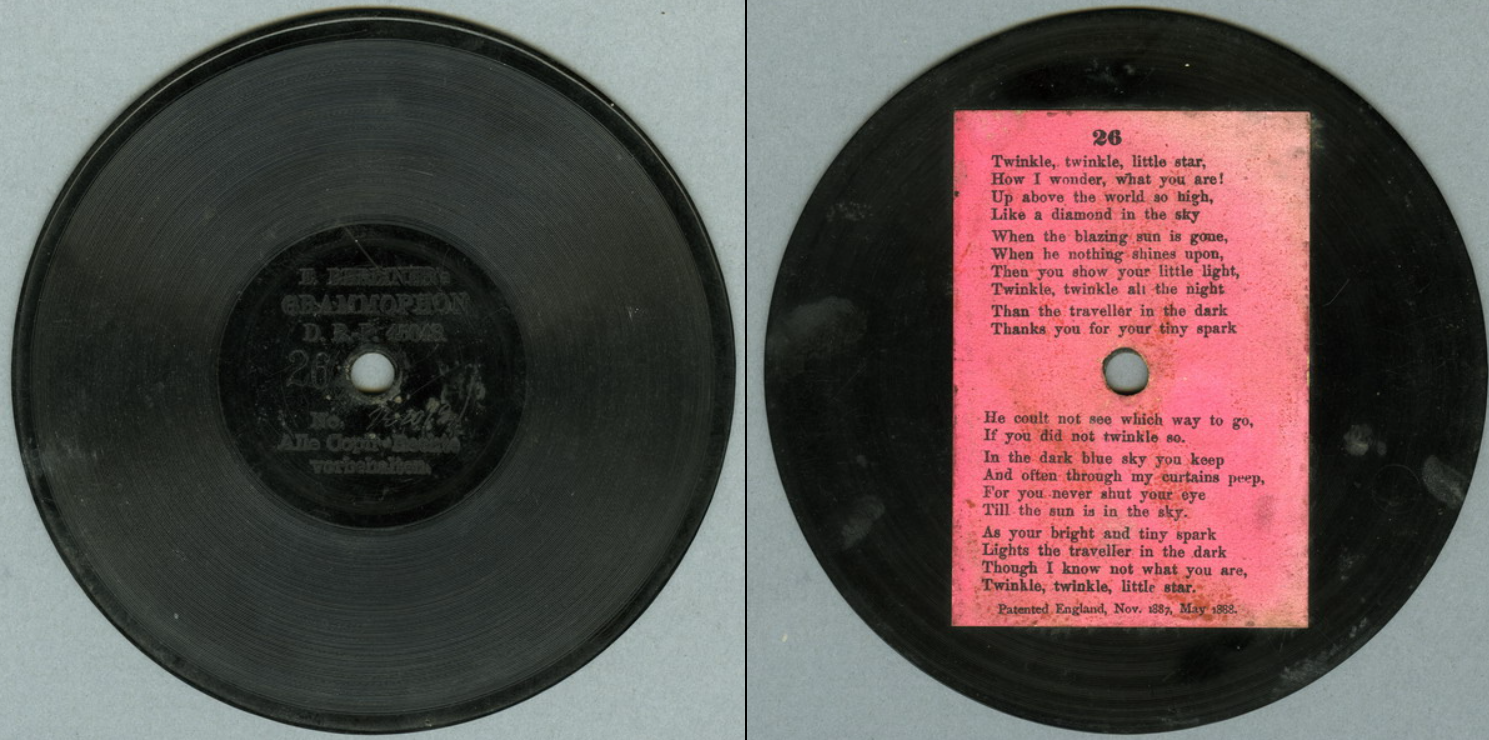
1891 (ca.) recording of "Twinkle Twinkle, little star", attributed to E. Berliner

Emile Berliner received U.S. patents 372,786 and 382,790 on the Gramophone on November 8, 1887, and May 15, 1888, respectively. This was before the organization of the North American Phonograph Company, which first produced cylinder recordings for public use, and thus Berliner's flat disc record is roughly contemporary with the exploitation of the cylinder medium, though it took longer for Berliner to commence production of his discs in America. Although based in Washington, D.C., Berliner's first joint venture was undertaken in Germany in 1889 with the manufacturer Kämmer & Reinhardt, a maker of toys.

The Kämmer & Reinhardt machine utilized 5" hard rubber discs, and some machines and discs were exported to England. An 1890 recording of Twinkle, Twinkle Little Star, likely made by Berliner himself, is the oldest disc in the BBC Library or in the Bibliothèque nationale de France and was once touted as the oldest commercial disc in the world, though this has since been disproven. The Kämmer & Reinhardt venture did not last very long, though just how long is unclear.

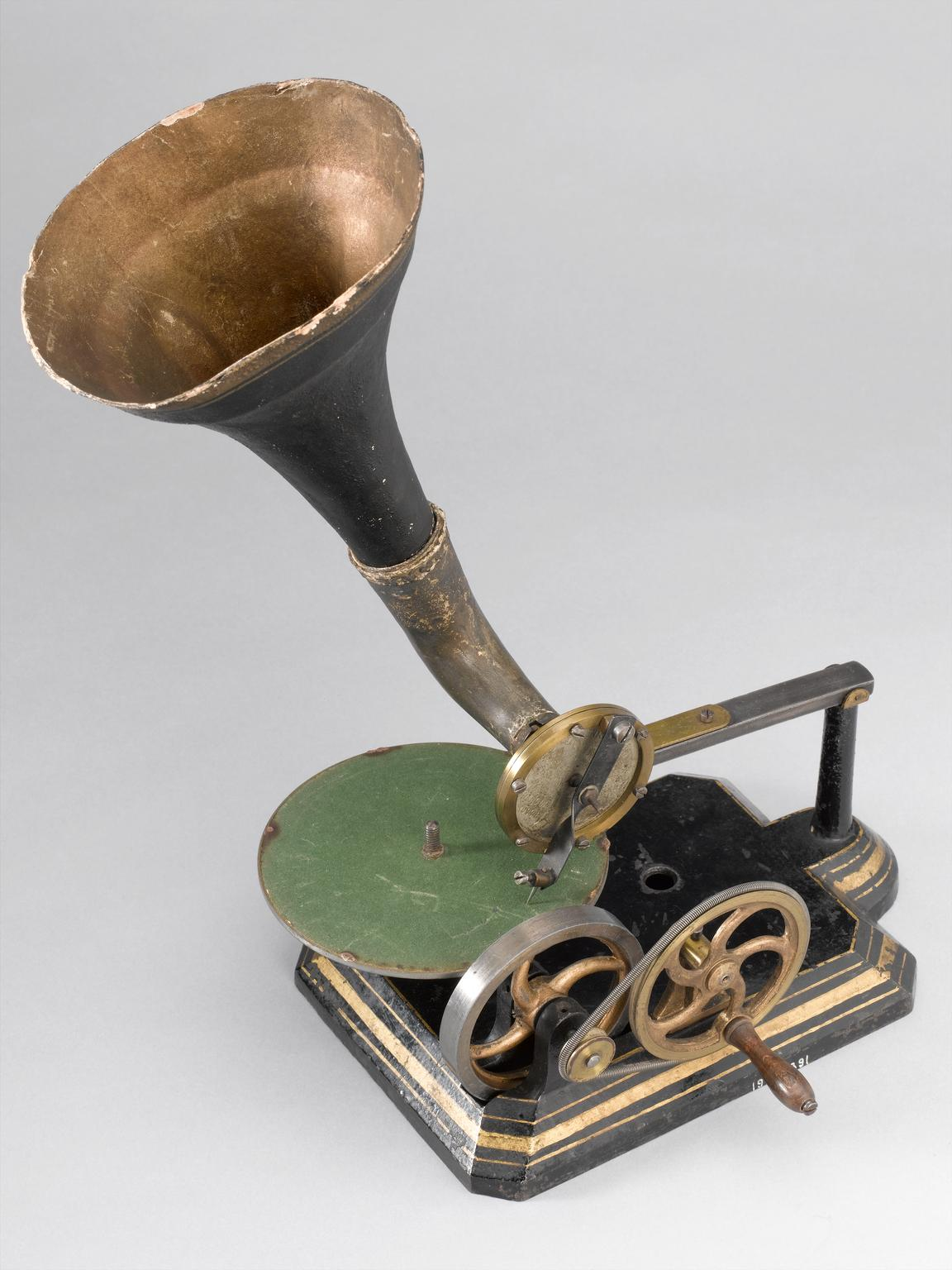
Photo of ca. 1890 Kämmer & Reinhardt hand-crank gramophone in the collection of the Science Museum (UK).

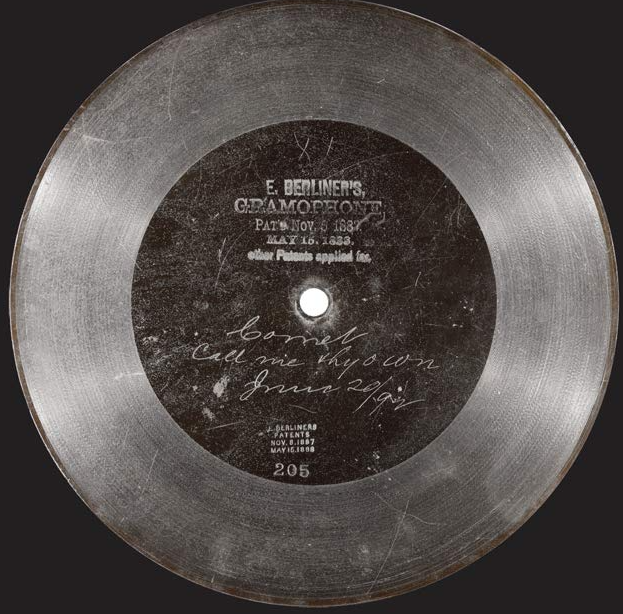
One of the earliest-known preserved 7" American disc record; cornet solo "Call me thy Own", recorded on Jun 20, 1892

In the early 1890s, Berliner attempted to found his first American company, the American Gramophone Company, in New York City, but it fell apart before issuing a single machine or disc. Back in Washington, D.C., Berliner tried again under the name of the United States Gramophone Company and began to manufacture machines and record 7-inch hard rubber discs in 1892 and in 1894 (though commercially available plates would only appear since 1894). Some celluloid discs were also made. In 1895, hard rubber was replaced by a shellac compound, which in various formulations remained the standard disc record material until the first vinyl records – initially made only for radio use and other special applications – were introduced in the 1930s.

Beginning in 1896, Berliner's gramophone players were made by Philadelphia-based machinist Eldridge Johnson, who added a spring motor to drive the previously hand-rotated turntable. Berliner also opened an office in New York City, staffed by Frank Seaman and O. D. LaDow and organized as the National Gramophone Company.

Master recordings were made onto zinc plates, which were then electroplated and a negative-image "mother" made from them to stamp discs. A major reversal of Berliner's fortunes occurred when the mastering plant in Washington, D.C. burned down on September 29, 1897, destroying a hundred unissued masters and all of his record manufacturing equipment. Within a few months, however, Berliner was up and running again, with some record production aspects moved to Philadelphia.

Berliner records were short-playing. Only about two minutes could comfortably fit on each single-sided 7-inch disc. The absolute maximum depended on the speed, which was not standardized and ranged from about 75 rpm to a more typical 70 rpm down to as slow as 60 rpm. During most of the 1890s, the competing small-diameter brown wax cylinder records were recorded at about 120 rpm and could play for as long as three minutes, although recordings fully that long were uncommon. At the end of the decade, cylinder record makers began a transition to higher speeds, mainly to produce louder-playing cylinders that could better compete with the considerably louder gramophone – cylinders had usually been heard through individual stethoscope-like listening tubes, rather than through a horn that yielded relatively feeble sound. A new standard cylinder speed of 160 rpm was soon established, reducing the maximum playing time to a little over two minutes and losing an advantage over Berliner's discs.

As the popularity of the gramophone began to pick up, Berliner found himself having to deal with infringers on his patents. In 1898, Berliner shut down at least two firms that were leeching off his business models and, in the first case, products. In 1899, Berliner discovered that Frank Seaman was behind a machine called the Zonophone that seemed an exact replica of the Gramophone. Furious, Berliner cut off all supply to New York, which proved a fatal error.

Seaman countersued for breach of contract, and in June 1900 the court granted an injunction against Berliner and United States Gramophone Company. Though he would attempt in several proceedings afterward to have the injunction overturned, it was allowed to stand and it compelled Emile Berliner's exit from the gramophone business in the United States of America.

Berliner transferred his patents to Eldridge Johnson, who then changed the name over the door to his own, though Berliner retained a share in the new company. In March 1901, Johnson registered the name Victor Talking Machine Company and launched the brand later in the year. By 1905 it had regained the lead in the American disc record business, while by 1906 Seaman's Zonophone was on a receiver's index.

== Foreign interests ==
In 1895, comic Billy Golden introduced Berliner to Fred Gaisberg, who, with Barry Peter Owen – a trusted associate within the National Gramophone Company – helped to establish Berliner's overseas interests. Although the German partnership with Kämmer & Reinhardt had long since ended, Berliner still held patents in Germany and England. In 1898, Owen founded the Berliner subsidiary in England which eventually took the name of Gramophone & Typewriter Ltd.; in 1931, this was one of the companies that was folded into EMI. That same year, Gaisberg established Berliner's German subsidiary as Deutsche Grammophon; this was the longest-lasting record company in history under its original charter, until finally being acquired by Universal Music Group in 1999. Gaisberg also founded a Berliner subsidiary in St. Petersburg, Russia in 1901.

E. Berliner Gramophone of Canada was established in 1899. It was first located in the Aqueduct Street building of Northern Electric in Montreal, and commenced marketing records and gramophones the following year. In 1904, the company received its charter as the Berliner Gram-o-phone Company of Canada. Early recordings were imported from masters recorded in the United States until a recording studio in Montreal was established in 1906.

The Berliner name as a record label lasted longest in Canada. In 1918, Emile Berliner's son Herbert Berliner left Berliner Gram-O-Phone and founded the Compo Company. Herbert's younger brother, Edgar, continued as chief executive of Berliner Gram-o-phone. In 1924, Canadian Berliner was bought out by USA's Victor and became Victor Talking Machine Company of Canada. Emile Berliner died in 1929 – the same year RCA bought out Victor – and Edgar Berliner resigned from Canadian RCA in 1930.

Berliner Gram-o-phone's facilities in Montreal, a complex of buildings at 1001 rue Lenoir and 1050 rue Lacasse in the St-Henri district, became home to RCA Victor Canada over the next several decades, developing and producing such high-tech products as microwave radio relay systems, communication satellites, television broadcast equipment, etc. Since the dissolution of RCA in 1986, the buildings have been turned into a multi-use office/commercial development, in which the Musée des ondes Emile Berliner, is documenting the history of the man, his company and the building complex, occupies part of the space. The historic Studio Victor located there was until 2014 an active recording studio. In 2015 the La hacienda creativ used the studio for recordings until 2021.

== Legacy and preservation ==
The range of material on Berliner records was wider than that available from cylinder companies in the 1890s. As may be expected, Berliner was well-supplied with the typical band and song selections commonly found on cylinders, but he also branched out into piano music, ragtime, speeches, sermons, instrumental solos and some ethnographic material on a greater scale than his competitors. From the beginning, Berliner's European subsidiaries were deeply invested in opera and classical music, only indirectly exploited by American cylinder companies, at least in the 1890s.

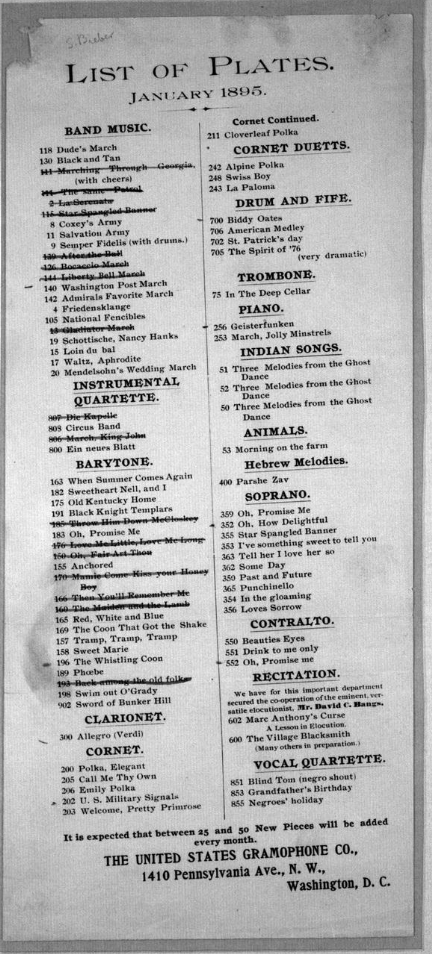
Catalogue of commercially available records released in Jan 1895. Some of the 1892 recordings can be seen (namely BeA 205, 256 and 300)

Documenting the output of American Berliner has proved a daunting task, as original records are scarce collector's items and the company employed a system of block numbering that seems to make little sense. Although referred to commonly as "Berliner matrices", they are not true matrix numbers, but catalog numbers concerned with preserving the same number for each selection even if a given title was re-recorded by another artist. Subsequent re-recordings are usually given a letter suffix, usually "Z-W" for early releases. Helpfully, the recording or matrix processing date is usually inscribed in the label area, but as Berliner did not employ paper labels sometimes the information is difficult to read. Many times the matrix numbers were reused to fit new records into the crumbling block system, such as the case of block 900 (which was meant to be for popular and international songs, only to be completely scrapped and refocused on opera excerpts, granting most matrix numbers to opera singer Ferruccio Giannini).

A simple new more or less sequential numbering system was started in March 1899, in which every number had a leading zero (never used previously) and the letter suffix, when present, denoted the category, e.g., "A" for marching band, "F" for banjo, "N" for vocal quartet. Berliner's foreign matrices employed entirely different strategies, and many to most of those have been documented by discographer Alan Kelly.

In 2014, the EMI Archive Trust announced an online initiative that would collect information on Berliner records worldwide. They have what appears to be the largest concentration of Berliner records in one place, numbering close to 18,000 items and largely collected by Fred Gaisberg in the early years of the company. Another large concentration of Canadian Berliners are held by the National Library of Canada, which has set up the Virtual Gramophone on the web to provide access to them, though their focus is primarily on Canadian artists.

There is a notable collection of Berliner records and gramophones housed at the Musée des ondes Emile Berliner, located in Montreal, QC, in one of the old RCA Victor factories.

== Berliner recording artists ==
Some of the notable artists who recorded for Berliner include:

- Auguste Aramini
- John Yorke Atlee
- Buffalo Bill
- Albert Campbell (singer)
- George Club
- Arthur Collins
- Cousins and DeMoss
- Cullen and Collins
- Charles D'Almaine
- Will F. Denny
- Virginia Powell Goodwin
- Diamond Quartette
- S.H. Dudley
- Edward M. Favor
- George J. Gaskin
- Billy Golden
- Alexander Heinemann
- George Graham (comic)
- Graus Mountain Choir
- Lil Hawthorne
- Russell Hunting
- George W. Johnson
- Dwight L. Moody
- Vess L. Ossman
- Arthur Pryor
- Dan W. Quinn
- Len Spencer
- Sousa's Band
- U.S. Marine Band

== Notable recordings ==
Below is a small selection of the most notable or popular 7" records strung by the company, most times the first iteration of the songs played. While these were not the most influential or historic records ever released, they certainly are highlights of a typical Berliner collection.

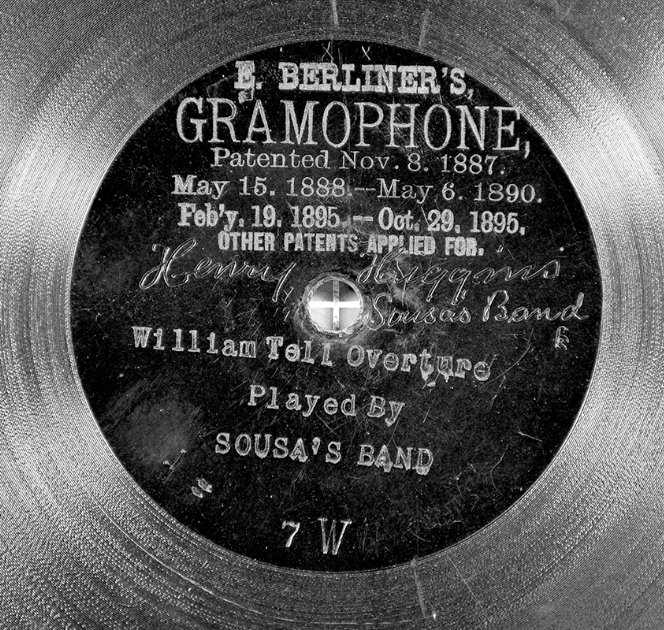
William Tell Overture (reduction), played by Sousa's band and released in August 1897

- Berliner 7W ("William Tell Overture", played by Sousa's Band)
- Berliner 140 ("Washington Post March", played by Sousa's Band)
- Berliner 830 ("Morning Serenade", played by the Boston Fadettes)
- Berliner 967 ("La Donna è Mobile", sung by F. A. Giannini (sic)), commonly considered to be the first serious opera record
- Berliner 932X ("Viva il Vino", sung by Ferruccio Giannini)
- Berliner 196 ("Whistling Coon", sung by George W. Johnson)
- Berliner 404 ("The Laughing Song", sung by G. W. Johnson)

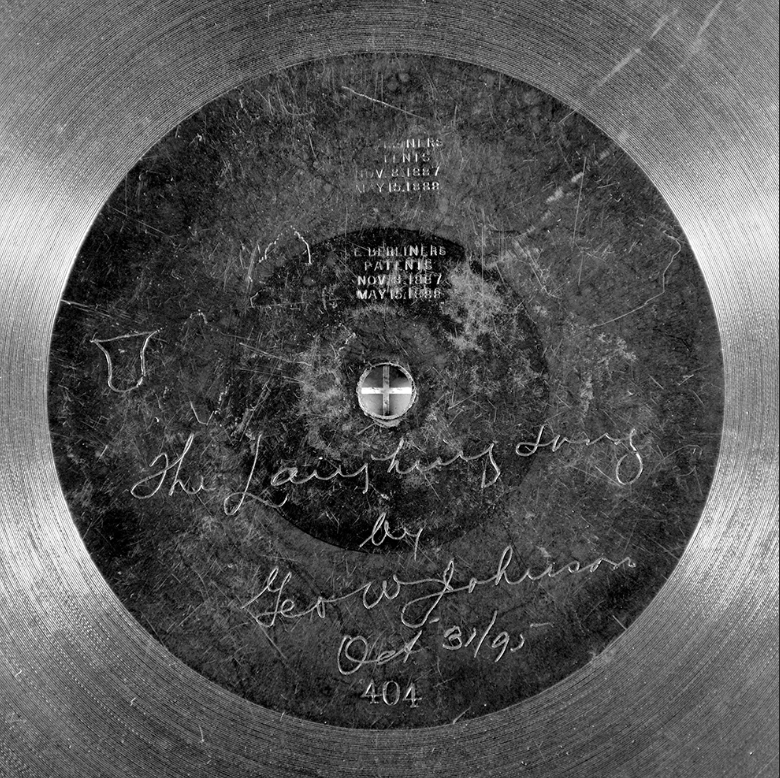
George W. Johnson's first gramophone recording of "The Laughing Song", pressed into an extremely crude plate and released in Oct. 31, 1895

- Berliner 930Y and 0572 ("Miserere", sung by Ferruccio Giannini)
- Berliner 940 ("Drill Ye Tarries, Drill", sung by George J. Gaskin)
- Berliner 3312 ("Blue Bells of Scotland", trombone solo by Arthur Pryor)
- Berliner 230 ("Commodore Polka", cornet solo by W. Paris Chambers)
- Berliner 3900 ("Carnival of Venice", saxophone solo by Jean Moeremans)
- Berliner 62 ("Romance for Trombone", trombone solo with band accompaniment)

== See also ==
- Emile Berliner
- Gramophone record
- Gramophone Company (British company)
- Deutsche Grammophon
- List of record labels
- Musée des ondes Emile Berliner
