= Alan Kelly (discographer) =

Scottish physicist and discographer (1928–2015)

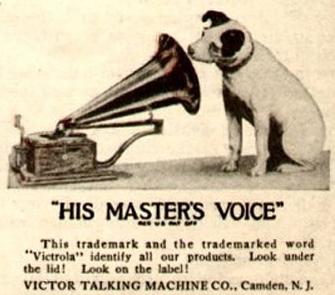
Logo of the label His Master's Voice

Alan Kelly (Girvan, Scotland, 27 June 1928 - ?, December 2015) was a Scottish physicist who was also considered a pioneer of discographers.

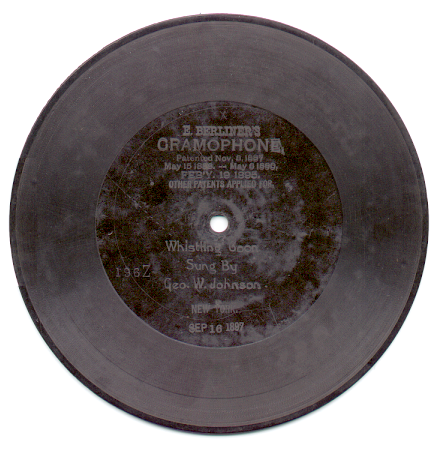
Disc of Berliner Gramophone

Kelly achieved his MA in Glasgow in 1948 and took the position of Head of Physics and Head of the Department of Professional Studies at the City of Sheffield College of Education. Kelly and his Department were made redundant when the College joined another to form Sheffield Polytechnic, currently Sheffield Hallam University. From this time, he developed his passion for old recordings.

In the 1940s he started collecting and listing opera recordings and 50 years later he was still doing so. As he wrote in the introduction to his Spanish catalogue: “since records were expensive, I also made lists of what was or had been available”. He contributed supplying much of the information to the study of John R Bennett about red label double-sided records issued in His Master's Voice’s (HMV) DA and DB series.

In 1988 Greenwood Press started publishing Kelly’s numerical catalogues of recordings made between 1898 and 1929 by HMV and its predecessor companies. The first volume was devoted to Italian recordings, the second to French recordings in 1990 and then in 1994 the long volume of German recordings. However an illness prevented him completing the Dutch and Belgian catalogue, which were in the end finished by Jacques Klöters in 1997. The following catalogues were issued by Kelly himself on CD-ROMs: Russian, Spanish, Czech and Hungarian, Australian and English. They all included listings of matrix numbers and unpublished recordings. He also accurately documented artists’ discographies. Kelly researched not only edited recordings, but also unpublished recordings.

He became a regular visitor both at the British Institute of Recorded Sound (now the British Library Sound Archive) and the EMI Archive at Hayes putting the data in a logical order and discovering the hidden code of the matrix numbers. In the end, Kelly, John Ward and John F Perkins revealed the code, and Kelly could develop the complete catalogue supplying essential data for the study of the European records until 1929: number or catalogue number, matrix number, date and place, artist/s, title and author. Nevertheless, there are still some gaps. Kelly’s research has become essential for scholars and librarians.

The importance of his work was first recognised in 2007 by the Association for Recorded Sound Collections in the USA and then later by an honorary doctorate of music by Sheffield University.

== Bibliography of catalogues ==
- Alan Kelly: His master's voice - La voce del padrone, the Italian catalogue; a complete numerical catalogue of Italian gramophone recordings made from 1898 to 1929 in Italy and elsewhere by the Gramophone Company Ltd.. New York; NY [et al.], Greenwood Press, 1988. ISBN 0-313-26498-8
- Alan Kelly: His master's voice, the French catalogue; a complete numerical catalogue of French gramophone recordings made from 1898 to 1929 in France and elsewhere by the Gramophone Company Ltd. New York; NY [et al.], Greenwood Press, 1990. ISBN 0-313-27333-2
- Alan Kelly: His master's voice, the German catalogue; a complete numerical catalogue of German gramophone recordings made from 1898 to 1929 in Germany, Austria, and elsewhere by The Gramophone Company Ltd. New York; NY [et al.], Greenwood Press, 1994. ISBN 0-313-29220-5
- Alan Kelly; Jacques Klöters: His master's voice, the Dutch catalogue; a complete numerical catalogue of Dutch and Belgian gramophone recordings made from 1900 to 1929 in Holland, Belgium, and elsewhere by the Gramophone Company Ltd. Westport, Conn. [et al.], Greenwood Press, 1997. ISBN 0-313-29883-1
