= Ponte d'Arbia =

- Frazione
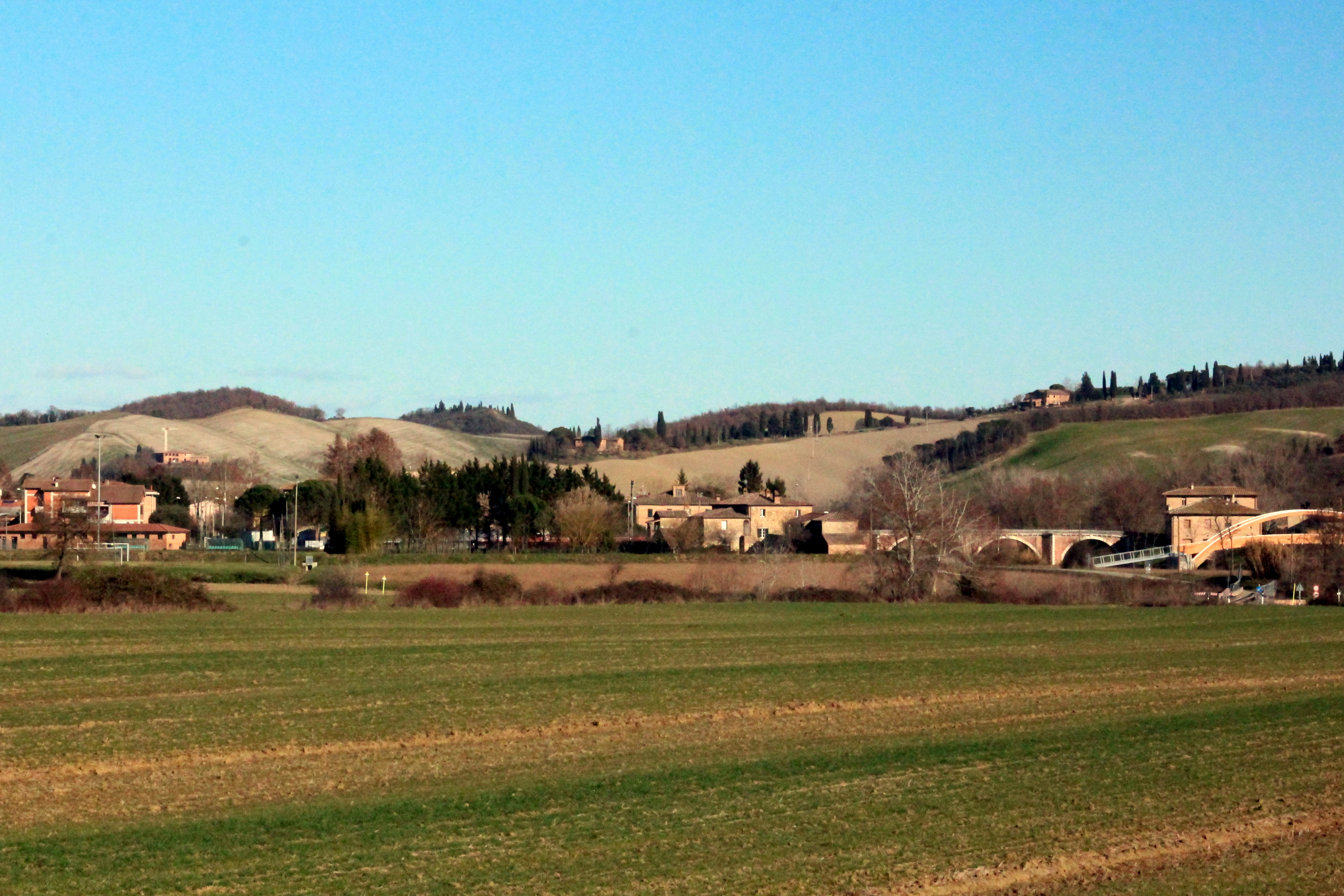
- View of Ponte d'Arbia

- Location of Ponte d'Arbia in Italy
- Coordinates: 43°10′5″N 11°27′56″E
- Country: Italy
- Region: Tuscany
- Province: Siena (SI)
- Comune: Buonconvento; Monteroni d'Arbia
- Elevation: 147 m (482 ft)

Population (2011)
  - Total: 499
- Demonym: Pontedarbini
- Time zone: UTC+1 (CET)
  - Summer (DST): UTC+2 (CEST)

Ponte d'Arbia is a village in Tuscany, central Italy, administratively a frazione of the comuni of Buonconvento and Monteroni d'Arbia, province of Siena. At the time of the 2001 census its population was 496.

Ponte d'Arbia is about 23 km from Siena, 4 km from Buonconvento and 9 km from Monteroni d'Arbia.

== Gallery ==
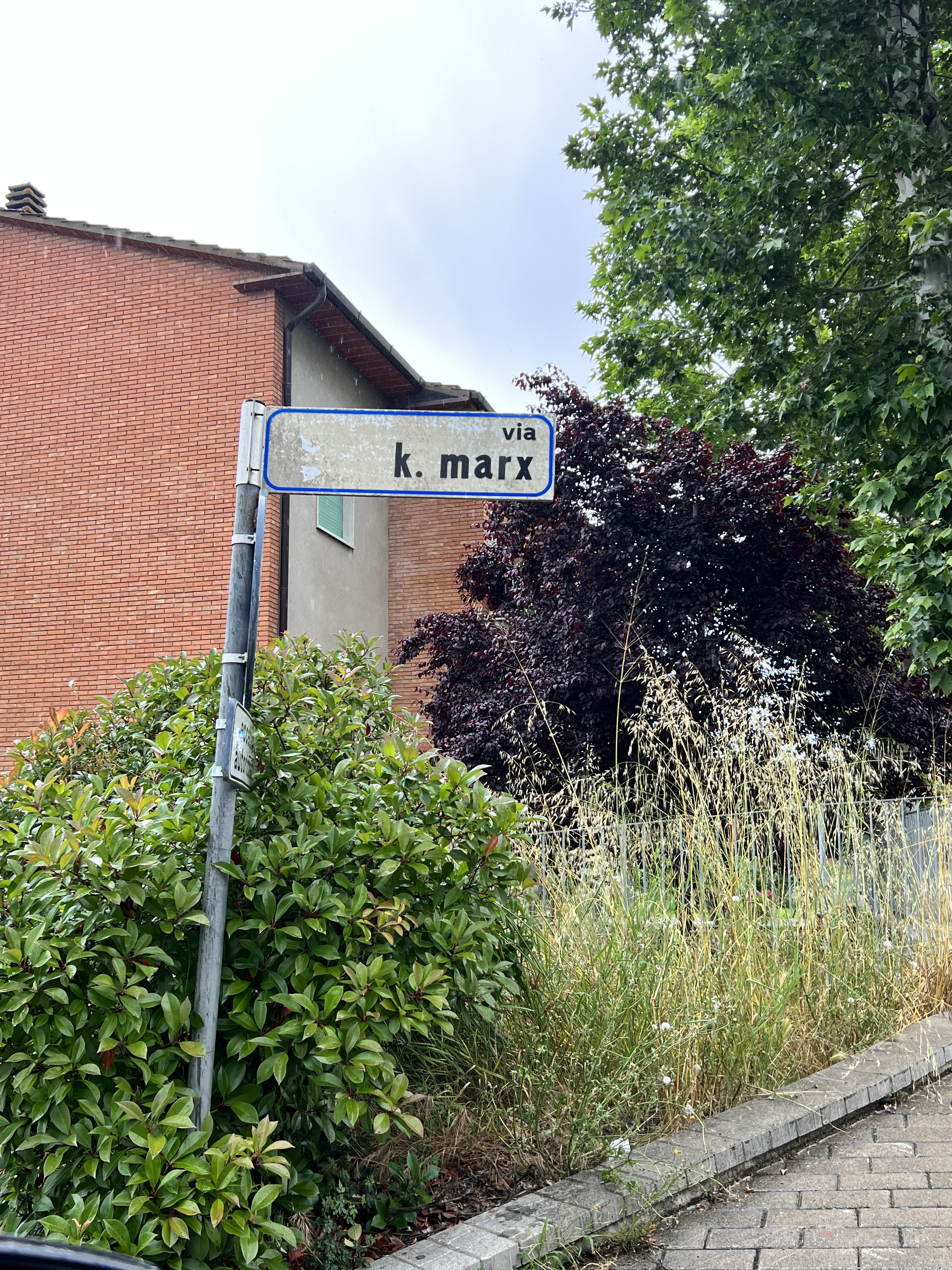
Via Karl Marx, Ponte d'Arbia

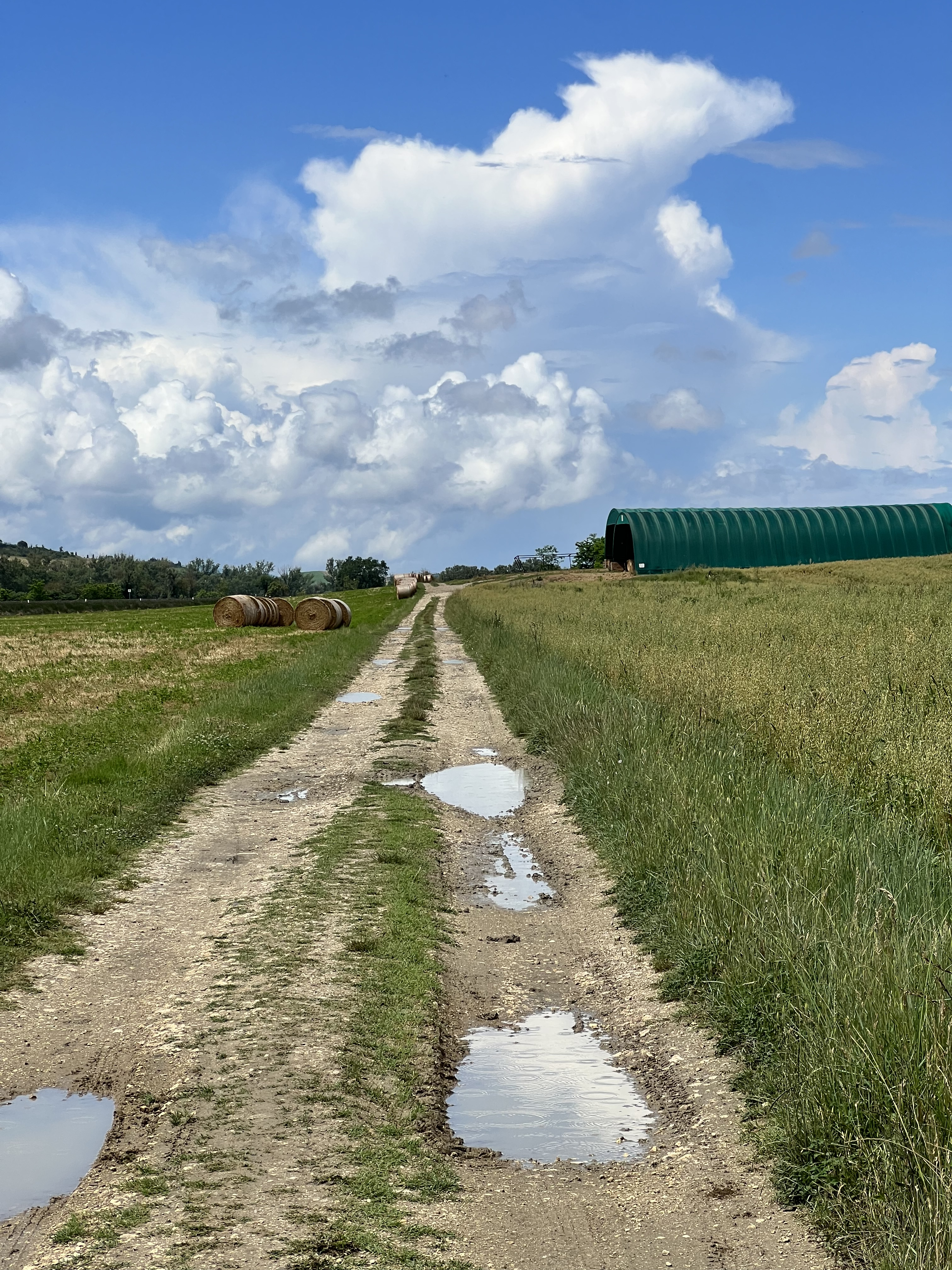
Hiking trail to the west of Ponte d'Arbia

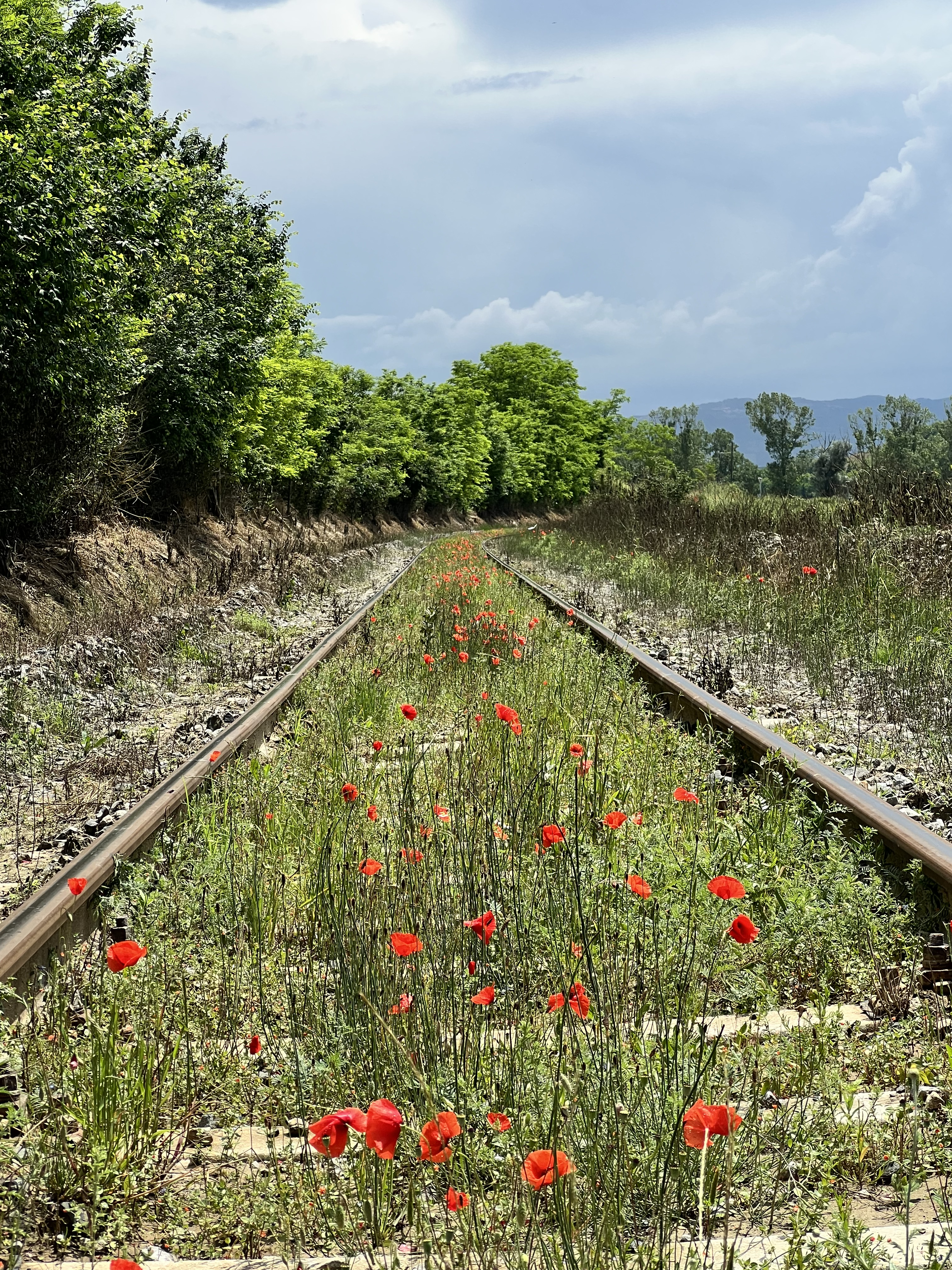
Abandoned rail line to the west of Ponte d'Arbia
