= Mary Concepta Lynch =

Irish nun and skilled calligrapher

- Born: Bridget Mary Lynch; November 4, 1874 (baptism date); Booterstown, Dublin, Ireland
- Died: April 30, 1939 (aged 64–65); Dún Laoghaire, Dublin, Ireland
- Occupations: Nun, teacher, artist
- Relatives: Shaun Glenville (cousin)

Mary Concepta Lynch (1874 – 1939), was an Irish nun and skilled artist, illuminator, and calligrapher, who spent 16 years ornately decorating the Celtic design in the Oratory of the Sacred Heart at St. Mary's Dominican Convent in Dún Laoghaire, County Dublin, Ireland.

== Early life and family ==
Known familiarly as "Lily", Bridget Mary Lynch was born in Booterstown, Dublin, to Thomas Joseph Lynch a renowned Dublin illumination artist with studios in the city centre, who was known as the King of Celtic Art in the 1880s. Eldest of five, she was his only child to survive infancy. His business specialised in high quality illuminated addresses and he trained her in his trade. Following his death from tuberculosis on 17 August 1887 she was named his sole beneficiary aged 12.

Although very young, with the support of her father's sisters, Lily worked to keep his studio going and undertook artistic commissions. Her mother, Anne Marie (née Burke), had no dealings with the business or estate and died two years after Thomas, leaving Lynch an orphan.

== Career ==
While the studio maintained itself as a business, despite a subsequent fire, Lynch always felt close to her former convent school. She eventually decided to become a nun there, entering the enclosed Dominican Order in St Mary's Convent, Dún Laoghaire (then called Kingstown), on 5 July 1896.

She took the name Sr. Mary Concepta. As Mary was a prerequisite name of all the nuns at the convent she was known as Concepta, Connie to other nuns or Con to some students.

As the order was a teaching order, Lynch worked there as an educator. She taught art and illustrated the school magazine and the convent's official annals. She wrote plays for and staged tableaux with her students on Irish cultural and religious subjects, and created elaborate cribs each Christmas. She had musical ability as well, teaching music including the kazoo and she wrote hymns. Lynch was one of the early devotees in Ireland to St Thérèse of Lisieux. Many of the hymns Lynch wrote were to honour this saint.

She also held a devotion to Saint Columba and greatly revered the medieval Columban Irish monks who produced the masterpieces of Insular illumination such as The Book of Kells.

=== Oratory of Sacred Heart ===
To commemorate the end of the First World War, a small oratory was built at the convent, to house a statue sent in recognition of the men of the area who died in Belgium.

The oratory was dedicated to the Sacred Heart in 1919. Beginning the next year, in 1920, Lynch first worked on the wall behind the statue, which stood above the altar, to provide it with a proper setting, in an Eastern Christian or Byzantine medieval style; and on the Gaelic script over the entrance door. After that she sought and was given permission to take on the whole interior of the oratory. The project was supported by her cousin, Shaun Glenville, and his wife, Dorothy Ward, who would regularly visit the convent. The couple were music hall entertainers, famous in their role as Pantomime dame and Principal boy, and raised funds for the oratory through benefit concerts. The studio of Joshua Clarke & Sons, father of Harry Clarke, created the seven stained-glass windows. One window is dedicated to her father, Thomas J. Lynch, represented by the Holy Family and another to Shaun Glenville and his family.

Lynch worked chiefly on her own as an act of religious devotion and decorated the walls of the oratory in an elaborate unified scheme of Celtic Revival design, utilising her father's Lynch Method, continuing until ill health forced her to stop in 1936. The medium used was household paint mixed to her colour requirements by a local hardware shop. She worked long hours, in her spare time from regular duties, in conditions of poor light and without heating. The overall artistic scheme was inspired following a vision at night in which the oratory appeared 'alight with colours in serpentine bands' and the design conceived was rigidly adhered to from the start throughout the years. Working stensils exist from 1921 to 1923 for different parts of the scheme including the ceiling, so the complete scheme was first marked on the surface in preparatory work and then Lynch built up the design to increasing states of completeness. The outline of the scheme was probably in place by the celebration of her Silver Jubilee, 11 November 1923, when family and friends came to visit her and were invited to view her work. She first elaborated the altar wall, worked up the side walls, then designs on the doors and exterior tympanum (not yet evident in March 1927). Probably for reasons of access, work on the ceiling was less further on. For this she lay on her back on a board between two ladders, and it was the ceiling and back upper wall which remained unfinished when she was finally forced to stop. The Lynch Method determined that one part of the whole should never be entirely finished but that the pattern was kept in a state of constant accumulation, thus while the ceiling is not in a finished state it is not painted in patches but rather worked to a uniform level giving a satisfying impression of artistic completeness.

== Critical acclaim ==
Etienne Rynne wrote

‘her work is ever mouvementé, vibrant with life; her birds squawk, bite and even dance, her serpents wriggle and knot themselves, as do her quadrupeds’

Two books were published about her works by the Order, the Dominican Sisters of Ireland, the illustrated A shrine of Celtic art (1977) and The Lynch method of Celtic illumination (1986). Funds were provided in 1996 by the Department of Arts, Culture, and the Gaeltacht to renovate the oratory and to provide a protective shell-building around it. A book, Divine Illumination, was published in 2019 to mark the centenary of the oratory, by the local library service.
