= Chiswick Empire =

Former theatre and cinema in Chiswick, Hounslow, London, England

Coordinates: 51.493°N 0.266°W

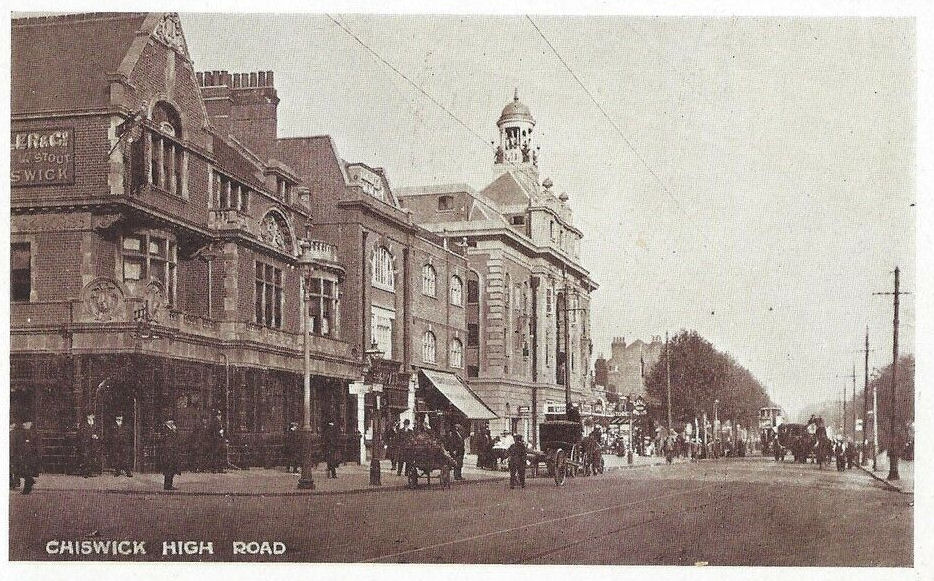
The Chiswick Empire on Chiswick High Road, next to the Old Packhorse, which still survives.

The Chiswick Empire was a theatre facing Turnham Green in Chiswick that opened in 1912 and closed and was demolished in 1959. A venue for touring artists, some of the greatest names in drama, variety and music hall performed there including George Formby, Laurel and Hardy, Chico Marx, Peter Sellers and Liberace.

== Early history ==
The architect Frank Matcham c. 1900

In 1910 the theatre owner and manager Oswald Stoll made a proposal to build a music hall on a site on Chiswick High Road, facing Chiswick's Turnham Green. There followed a public debate with many local people opposed to Stoll's plan, arguing that such a venue would be unsuitable in one of the more select residential areas in the town. Others were concerned that a music hall would encourage working-class people to waste their money: "having too many music halls is a great blow to thrift – a great weakness of the English race was their want of thrift" suggested one local resident. However, the new theatre had enough local support for a 2,000 signature petition in its favour. Permission was granted and Stoll built his new theatre at 414 Chiswick High Road; some shops and the local smithy had to be demolished to accommodate it.

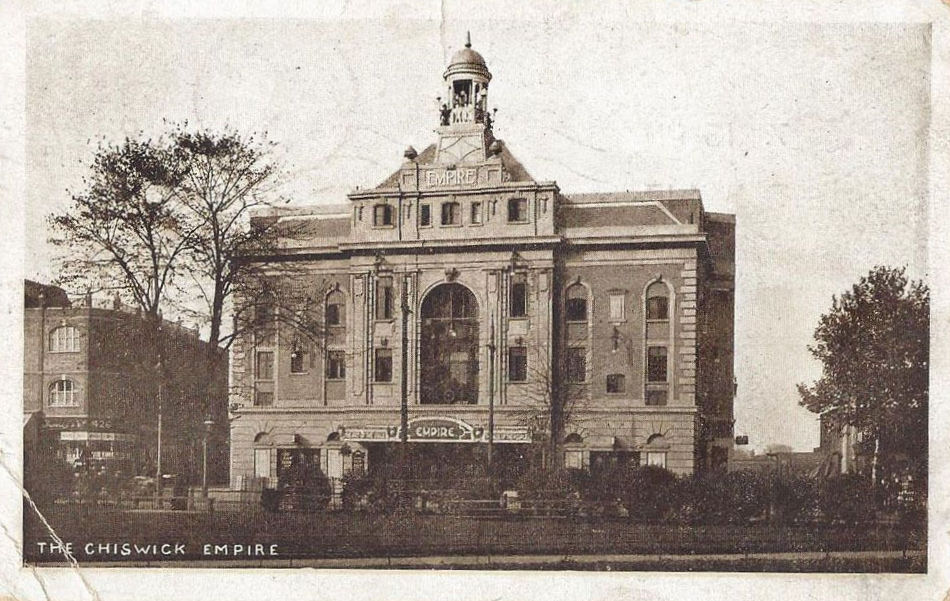
The Chiswick Empire (1913)

Chiswick Empire was designed for Stoll by the theatre architect Frank Matcham. The interior was decorated in what was called a "Jacobean" style, similar in design to the London Palladium. With a large two storey centrally placed opening with an open verandah, the auditorium could seat 1,948, (Note: Gillian Clegg states that it was built to seat 4.000.) with 890 in the Stalls, 454 in the Dress Circle, and 554 in the Balcony and eight boxes. The stage had a proscenium width of 44 feet and an orchestra pit for 15 musicians. Behind the scenes were 10 dressing rooms. An innovation was a sliding roof; it was seldom opened, but when it was, would cause clouds of dust to drop on the audience.

The Chiswick Empire opened on 2 September 1912 with a Variety bill that included some of the most popular performers of the time. While built as a venue for variety acts the Empire also at times staged plays. On 19 August 1913 while the theatre was empty a serious fire broke out which destroyed the stage and caused considerable damage to the auditorium. The fire was started by suffragettes after dousing much of the interior with oil, which caused the fire to spread rapidly. After extensive restoration at a cost of £12,000 the theatre reopened three months later with the appositely-named play The Miracle.

For the Christmas season each year the Empire put on a popular pantomime, with George Formby Sr appearing in that for 1915 while the popular entertainers Dorothy Ward and Shaun Glenville appeared there in Jack and the Beanstalk in 1949. Alma Cogan was in the 1955 pantomime Aladdin and His Wonderful Lamp. In 1915 the Empire also saw Gladys Cooper, Marie Lloyd and Vesta Tilley. In January 1917 Clara Butt appeared in a number of charity matinees and Queen Alexandra attended a concert in aid of the Chiswick Memorial Homes.

== Between the Wars ==
By the 1920s the Empire was home to twice nightly variety acts as well as revues, plays and opera, with the Swiss clown Grock appearing in 1921. The company of Ben Greet held a Shakespeare season at the theatre while variety stars such as Wee Georgie Wood, Tommy Handley and Charles Hawtrey also appeared. In 1930 Sybil Thorndike appeared at the theatre in the play The Distaff Side and the Carl Rosa Opera Company played there, as did the D’Oyly Carte Opera Company in 1931

In 1932 the Empire had a new manager who previously had worked in a theatre that had done well financially when it had changed to a full-time cinema. The Chiswick Empire similarly had a change of use to a cinema with a Western Electric sound system being installed. However, the move was not a success and in October 1933 the Empire reverted to being a live theatre with films only being shown on Sundays when live performances were prohibited.

== Later years ==
At the beginning of World War II the Empire closed in common with all other theatres across the country, but reopened at the end of 1941 when some of the biggest names in the entertainment industry appeared including: Vera Lynn, Jimmy Jewel and Ben Warriss, Jimmy James, Arthur Askey and Lucan & McShane (Old Mother Riley and Her Daughter Kitty).

After the War the Empire saw Laurel and Hardy in their first British tour (1947) and Chico Marx (1949), while in the 1950s entertainers who appeared at the venue included: Tommy Cooper, Max Miller, Max Bygraves, Julie Andrews, Morecambe and Wise, Ken Dodd, Max Wall, Dickie Valentine, the Ray Ellington Quartet, Peter Sellers and Dorothy Squires (1952), Laurel and Hardy on a return visit (1954), Al Martino, Alma Cogan, Terry-Thomas (1955) and Cliff Richard (1959).

The Chiswick Empire closed on 29 June 1959 with a week of performances by the American pianist Liberace. The structure was demolished within a month and Empire House, an office building, erected on the site.

In 1983 Derek Newark and Caroline Quentin appeared in the Channel 4 television play Hollywood Hits Chiswick, which imagined W.C. Fields revisiting the Empire and finding a supermarket built in its place.

Poster for Chico Marx, 1949

Poster for Liberace, 1959

== Peter Blake mural (2017) ==
Peter Blake's 2017 mural

In 2017 the pop artist Sir Peter Blake, a resident of Chiswick since 1957 and who saw Max Miller at the Chiswick Empire, created a Sgt. Pepper-like collage mural under the railway arches at Turnham Green tube station which featured some of the singers, actors, comedians and music hall artists who had performed at the Chiswick Empire including Marie Lloyd, Cliff Richard, Arthur Askey, Laurel and Hardy, Tommy Cooper, Max Wall, Liberace, Terry-Thomas, George Formby, Peter Sellers, Max Miller, Morecambe and Wise, Vesta Tilley, Wilson, Keppel and Betty and others. Prints of the mural were sold to raise money for the redevelopment of the ‘piazza’ area in Chiswick.
