= Sugaspott =

Zimbabwean rapper (born 1984)

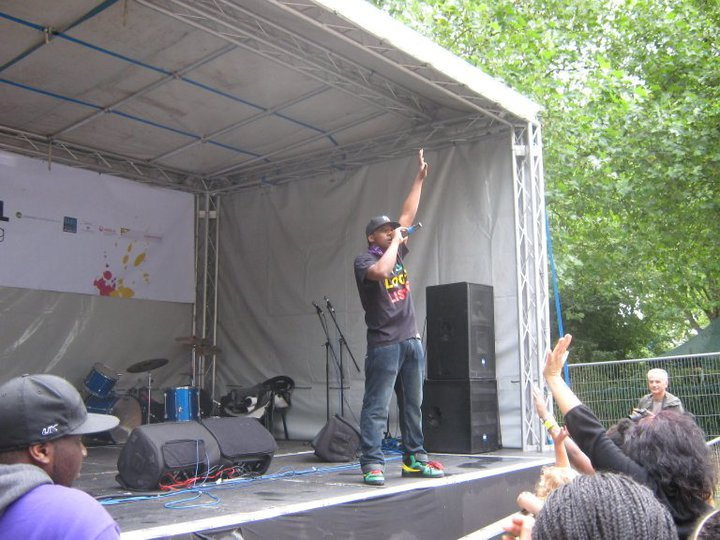
- Sugaspott performing on stage

Background information
- Born: Shingirai Kaserera; 14 June 1984 (age 41); Harare, Zimbabwe
- Origin: Mutare, Zimbabwe
- Genres: Hip hop
- Occupation: Rapper
- Website: sugaspott.com

Shingirai Kaserera (born 14 June 1984), popularly known as Sugaspott, is a Zimbabwean rapper. He was born and raised in Zimbabwe before moving to the United Kingdom. He headlined on the main stage at Brentford Festival in 2010 and 2013. He represented Zimbabwe at the Golborne World Music Festival in 2010.

== Biography ==
=== Life and music career ===
Sugaspott was born in Harare, Zimbabwe but grew up mostly in Mutare. It wasn't until after completing his high school education that he began to make records.[6] Mentored by various small groups similarly trying to establish themselves, he collaborated with local acts such as Mizchif. He moved to London in 2005 to study and it is there that he decided to pursue a career in music and tried to get his music noticed recording a number of demos that did not materialise into anything. He is known to have sold his own music by hand and developed his fan base by cold selling his music to them in the street. He worked with a number of other unsigned artists hoping that opportunities would arise as a cooperative result. Independent releases, shows at various venues and tireless self-promotion saw him garner attention, eventually impressing Tom Robinson enough to warrant rotation on BBC Radio's 6Music.

=== Genre and style ===
His lyrics contain a lot of emphasis on Zimbabwe and is quoted saying “I consider it an honorable burden to bear but a lot of my material is centered on removing the stereotype of Zimbabwe around the globe”. He is notable for seeking to create non-violent, positive rap lyrics and is listed under political rap on Allmusic. In 2009, he opened the show for Navin Kundra and The Dhol Foundation and a few months later for Apache Indian as part of a collective of unsigned artists who supported a series of shows around the UK.

== Discography ==
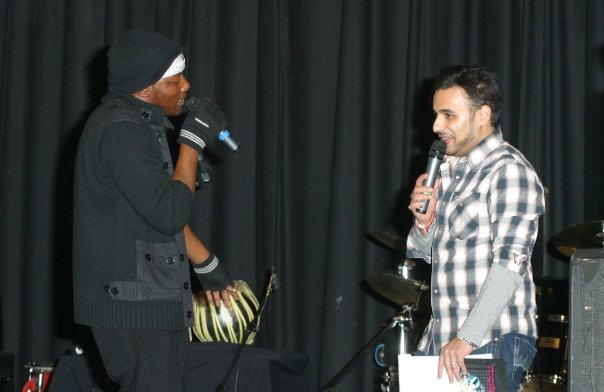
Ameet Chana interviewing Sugaspott on stage after performing at Chiswick Town Hall in 2009.

=== Albums ===
- This Is My Story (2009)
- Damage Limitation (2010)
- Damage Limitation Part 2: Broken Sanctuary (2014)

=== Singles ===
- "Sugaspott's Hiphop" (2010)
- "Bhogo Bhogo" (2010)
- "Real Hiphop" (2010)
