= Turnham Green =

Park and neighborhood in London, England

Coordinates: 51°29′31″N 00°15′58″W

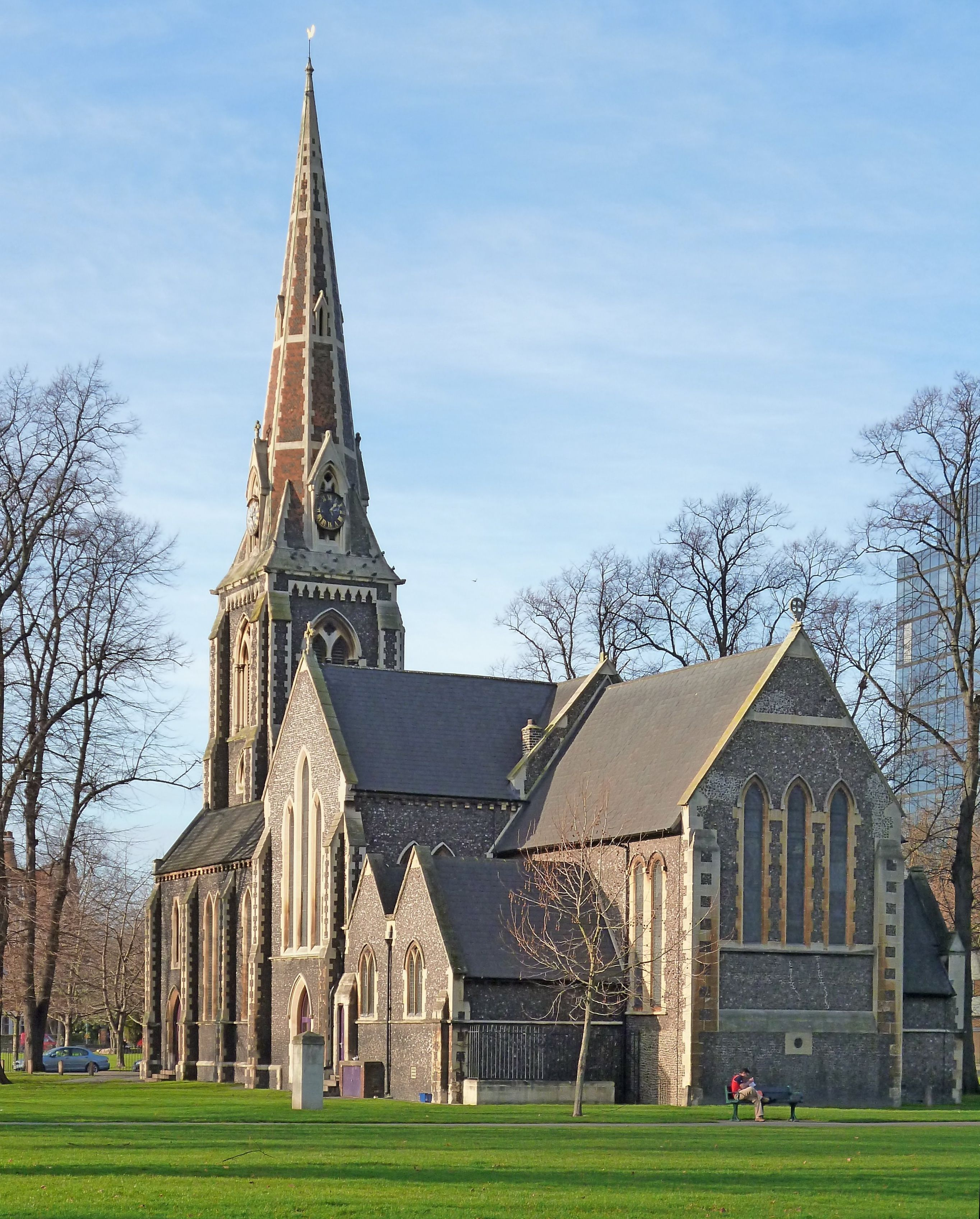
- Christ Church, Turnham Green

- Location within Greater London
- Population: 11,448 (2011 Census. Ward)
- OS grid reference: TQ212786
- London borough: Hounslow
- Ceremonial county: Greater London
- Region: London
- Country: England
- Sovereign state: United Kingdom
- Post town: LONDON
- Postcode district: W4
- Dialling code: 020
- Police: Metropolitan
- Fire: London
- Ambulance: London
- UK Parliament: Brentford & Isleworth
- London Assembly: South West

Turnham Green is a public park on Chiswick High Road, Chiswick, London, and the neighbourhood and conservation area around it; historically, it was one of the four medieval villages in the Chiswick area, the others being Old Chiswick, Little Sutton, and Strand-on-the-Green. Christ Church, a neo-Gothic building designed by George Gilbert Scott and built in 1843, stands on the eastern half of the green. A war memorial stands on the eastern corner. On the south side is the old Chiswick Town Hall.

The green is the site of local community events, including a travelling funfair, church events and charity table-top sales.

The nearest London Underground station is Chiswick Park on the District line.

Turnham Green tube station is on Chiswick Common, the site in 1642 of The Battle of Turnham Green.

== History ==
Turnham Green was a village on the main road between London and the west. It was recorded as 'Turneham' in 1235 and 'Turnhamgrene' in 1369.

On 13 November 1642, the Battle of Turnham Green was fought nearby during the First English Civil War resulting in the Parliamentarians blocking the King's advance on London.

In 1680 the homicidal Philip Herbert, 7th Earl of Pembroke murdered a watchman, William Smeeth, after a drunken evening in the local tavern. A similar but far less serious episode in the tavern, the Old Packhorse Inn, in 1795 saw the young Daniel O'Connell arrested for drunken and riotous behaviour.

From 1912 until its closure in 1959, the Chiswick Empire theatre stood facing the north side of Turnham Green.

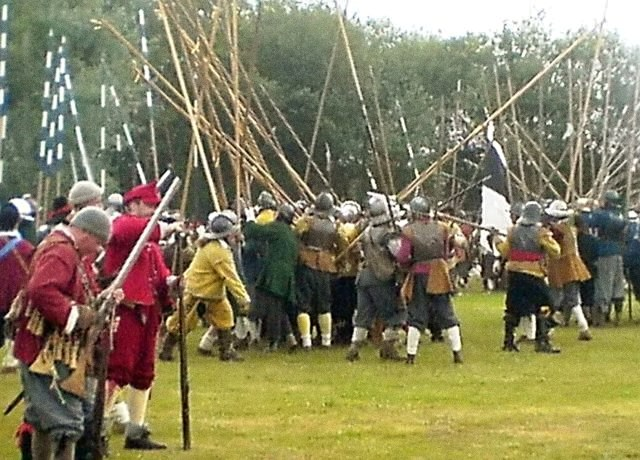
Reenactment of the 1642 Civil War Battle of Turnham Green

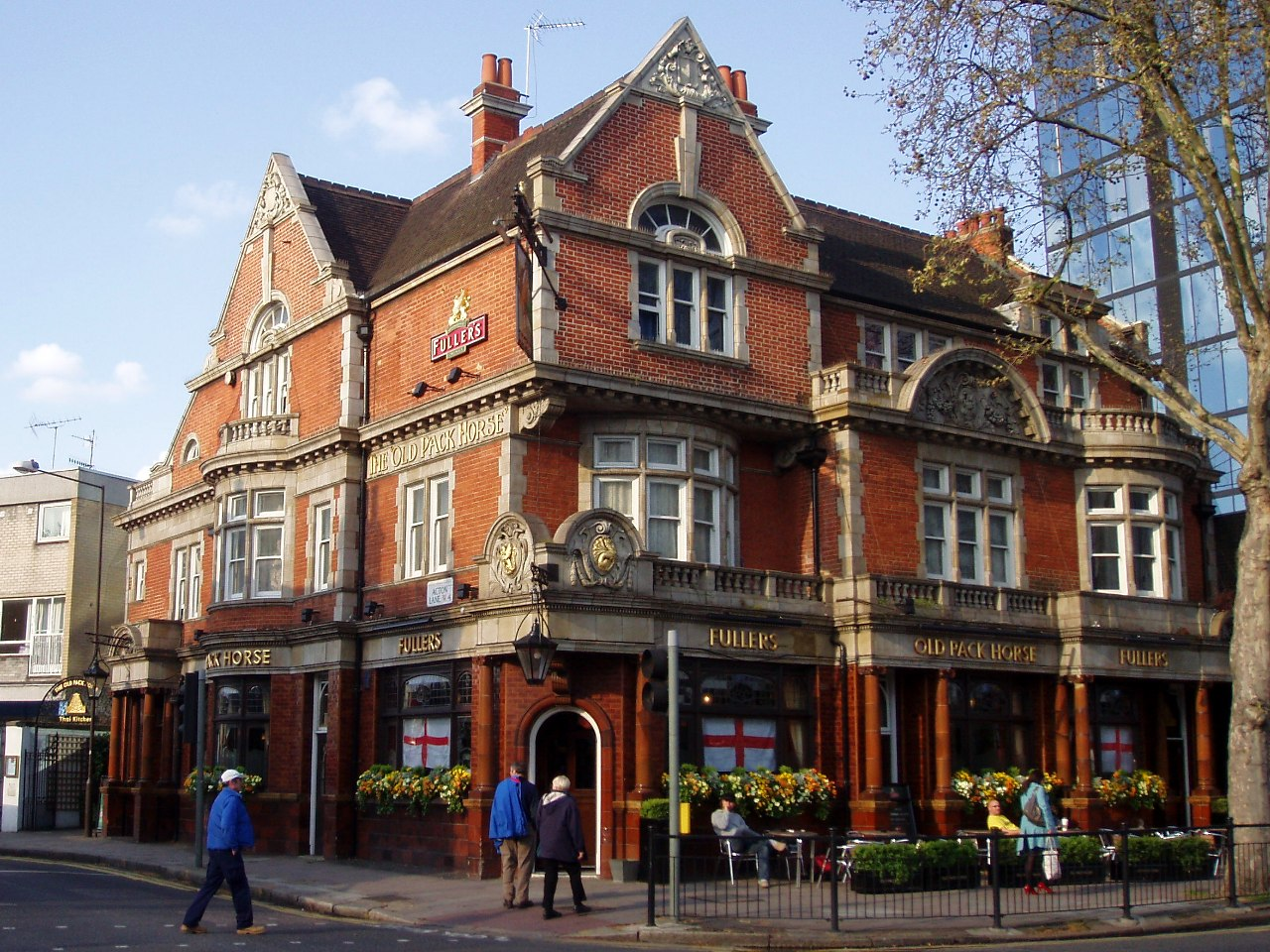
The Old Packhorse, 1910, replacing an earlier building

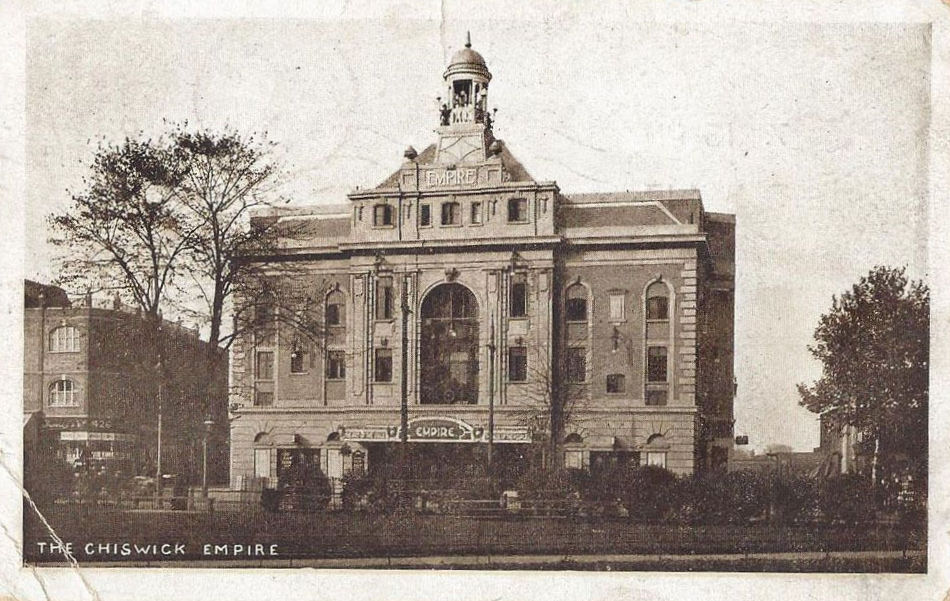
Chiswick Empire theatre, 1913

== Buildings ==
At the eastern end of the green stands Chiswick war memorial. It is in the form of a stone obelisk at the top of a flight of five steps, encircled by a metal fence and a yew hedge. It was unveiled on 13 November 1921 by the 9th Duke of Devonshire and Arthur Winnington-Ingram, the Bishop of London. It is made of Cornish granite. It was designed by a local architect, Edward Willis. It was given Grade II listed status in 2015.

In the middle of the green stands the tall Christ Church, Turnham Green, designed in the Gothic Revival style by George Gilbert Scott and opened in 1843. The chancel was extended in 1887.

Along the southern side of the green is Heathfield Terrace; its largest buildings are the Italianate 1876 Chiswick Town Hall, designed by W. J. Trehearne, and the former Army and Navy Furniture Repository, built around 1900, and now converted into flats. Further west, at the corner with Heathfield Gardens, is the red brick 1913 Turnham Green Church Hall with Arts and Crafts style decoration; it was built here as residents objected to having it in the park beside the church. It is now used as a school. Facing the southwestern corner of the green is Fromow's Corner, an "attractively detailed" curved red brick building with brick pilasters; a plaque at the corner of the roofline proclaims "Fromow & Sons Estd 1829, Erectd 1889".

In 2021, Hounslow Council reappraised the Turnham Green Conservation area. This is adjacent to the Chiswick High Road conservation area (which is further east), covering the part of the High Road from Chiswick Road in Gunnersbury to the west, via the whole of Turnham Green common and the buildings facing its north side along the High Road, to Clifton Gardens in the east. It takes in a substantial area to the south of the common, and was extended in 2019 to include the streets between Sutton Court Road and Duke's Avenue down to the Great West Road.

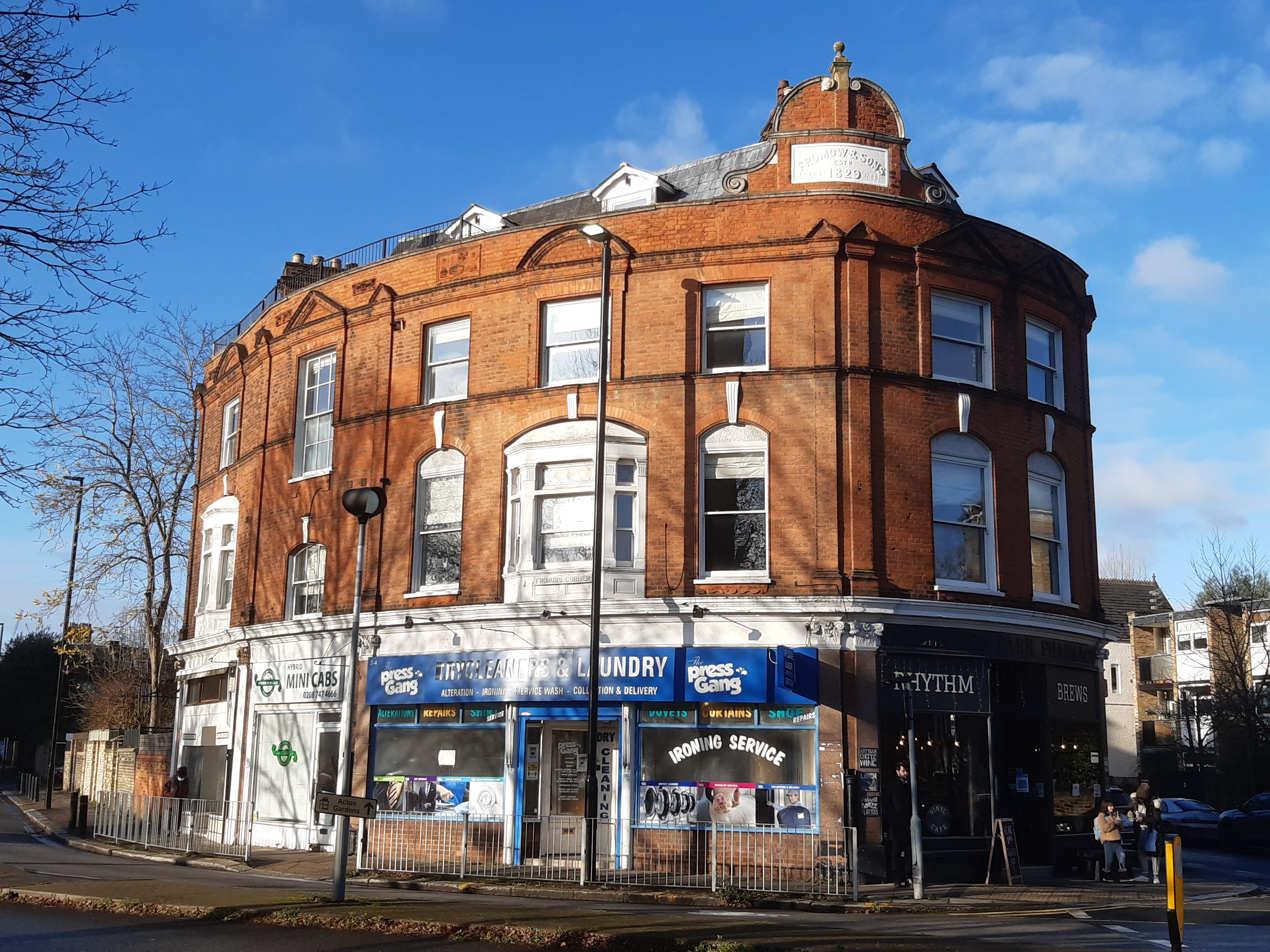
Fromow's Corner, 1889

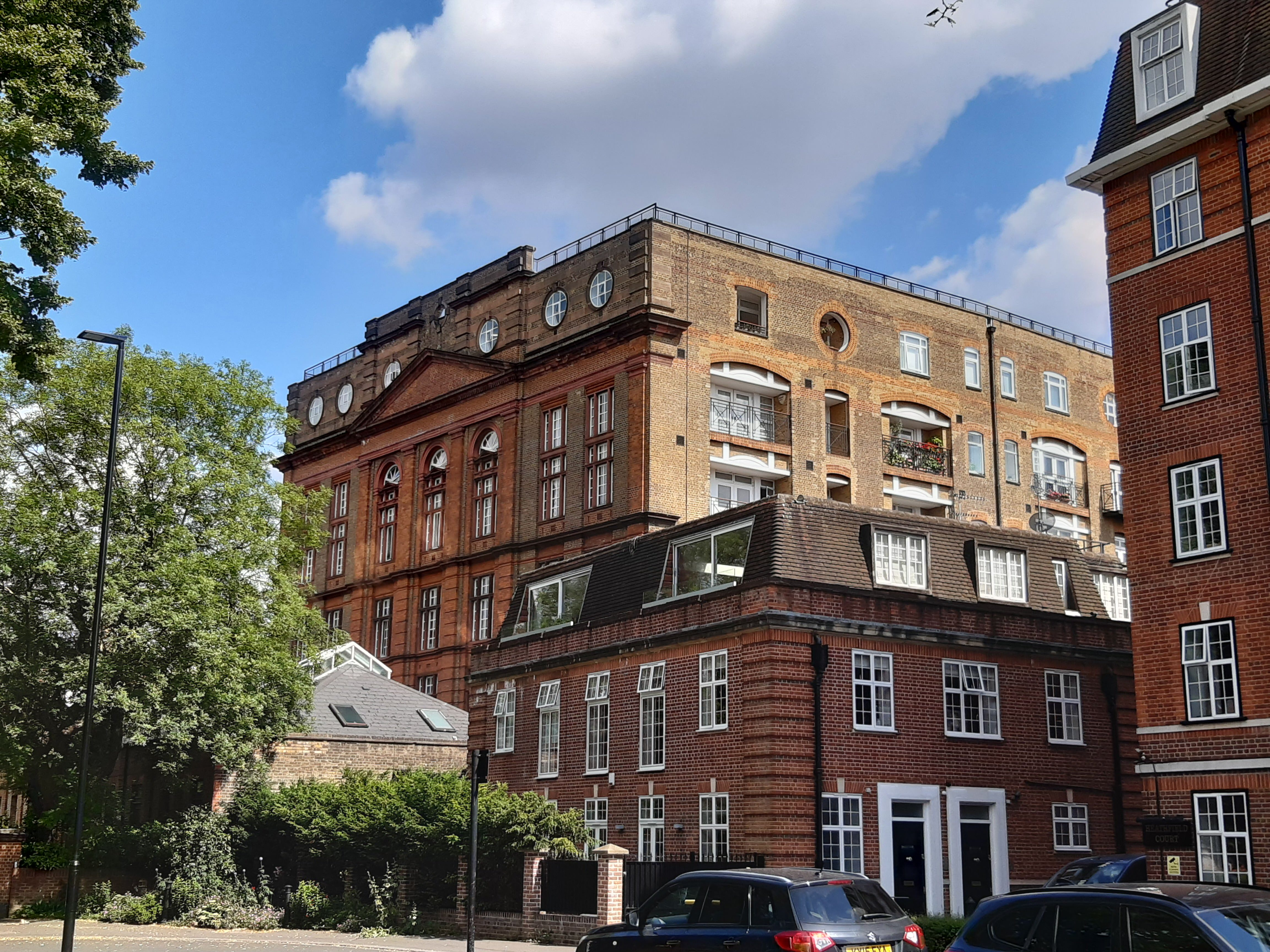
Former Army and Navy Furniture Repository, Heathfield Terrace, c. 1900

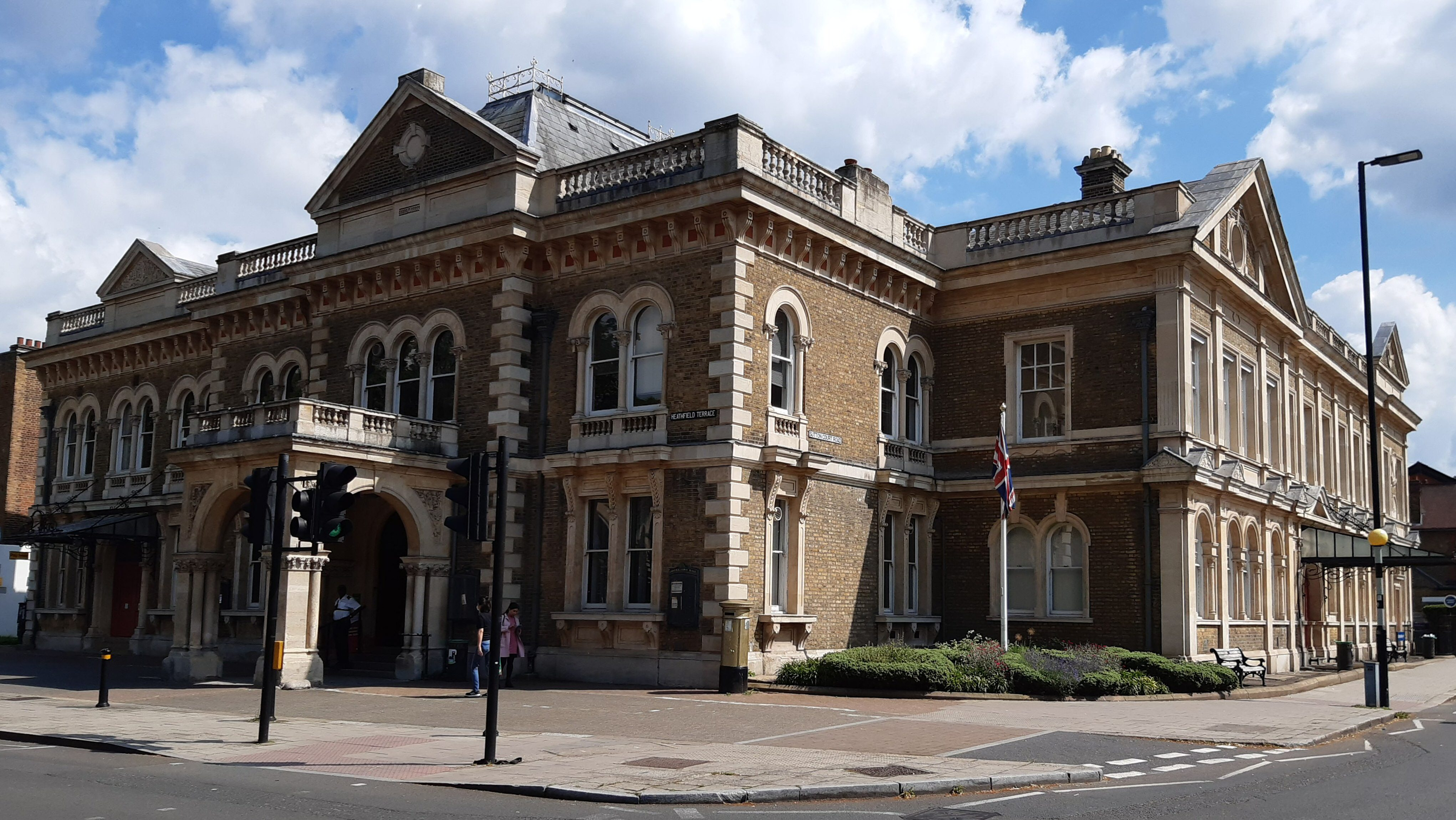
Chiswick Town Hall, Heathfield Terrace, 1876

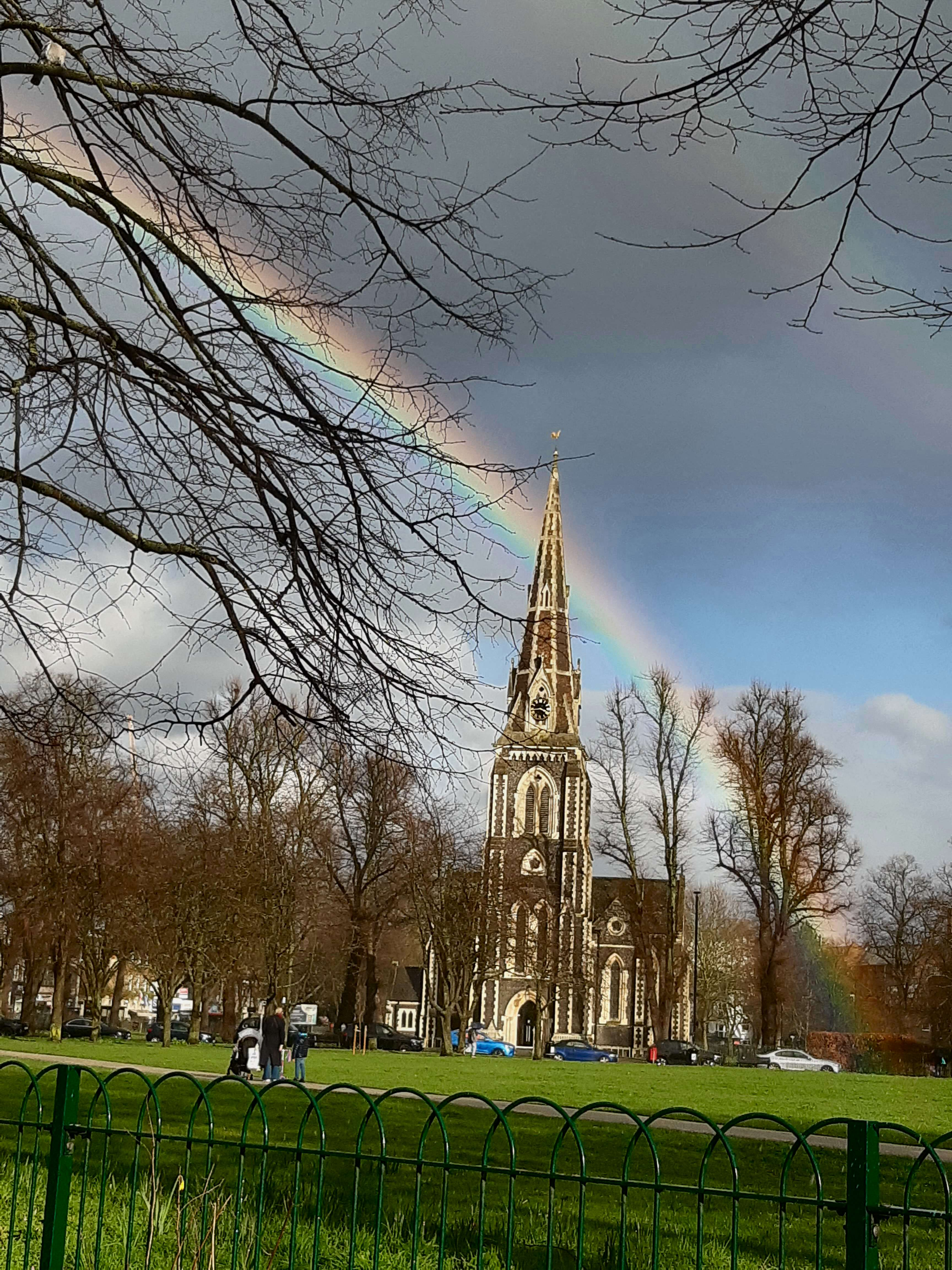
Christ Church, Turnham Green, 1843

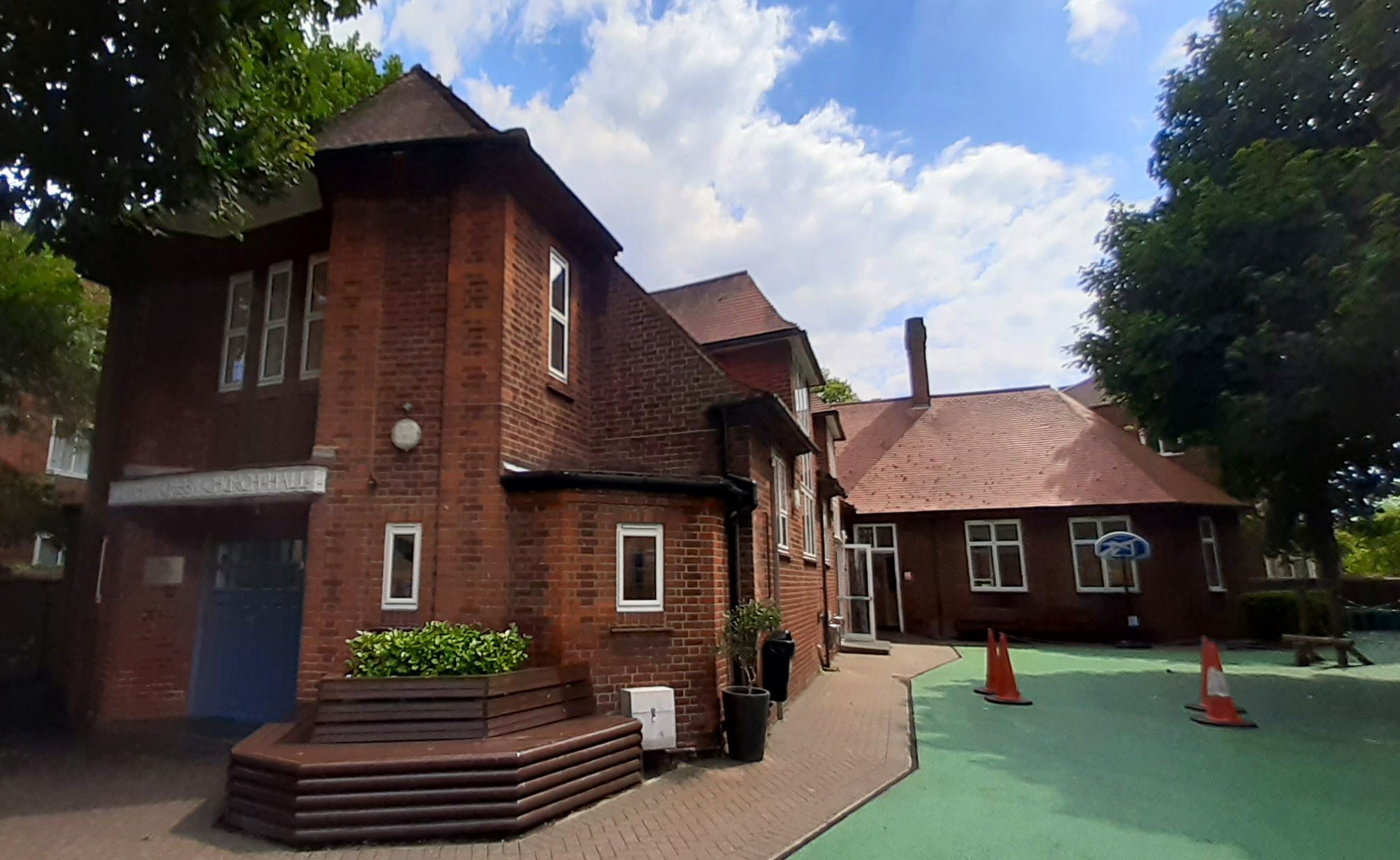
Turnham Green Church Hall, 1913, now used as a school

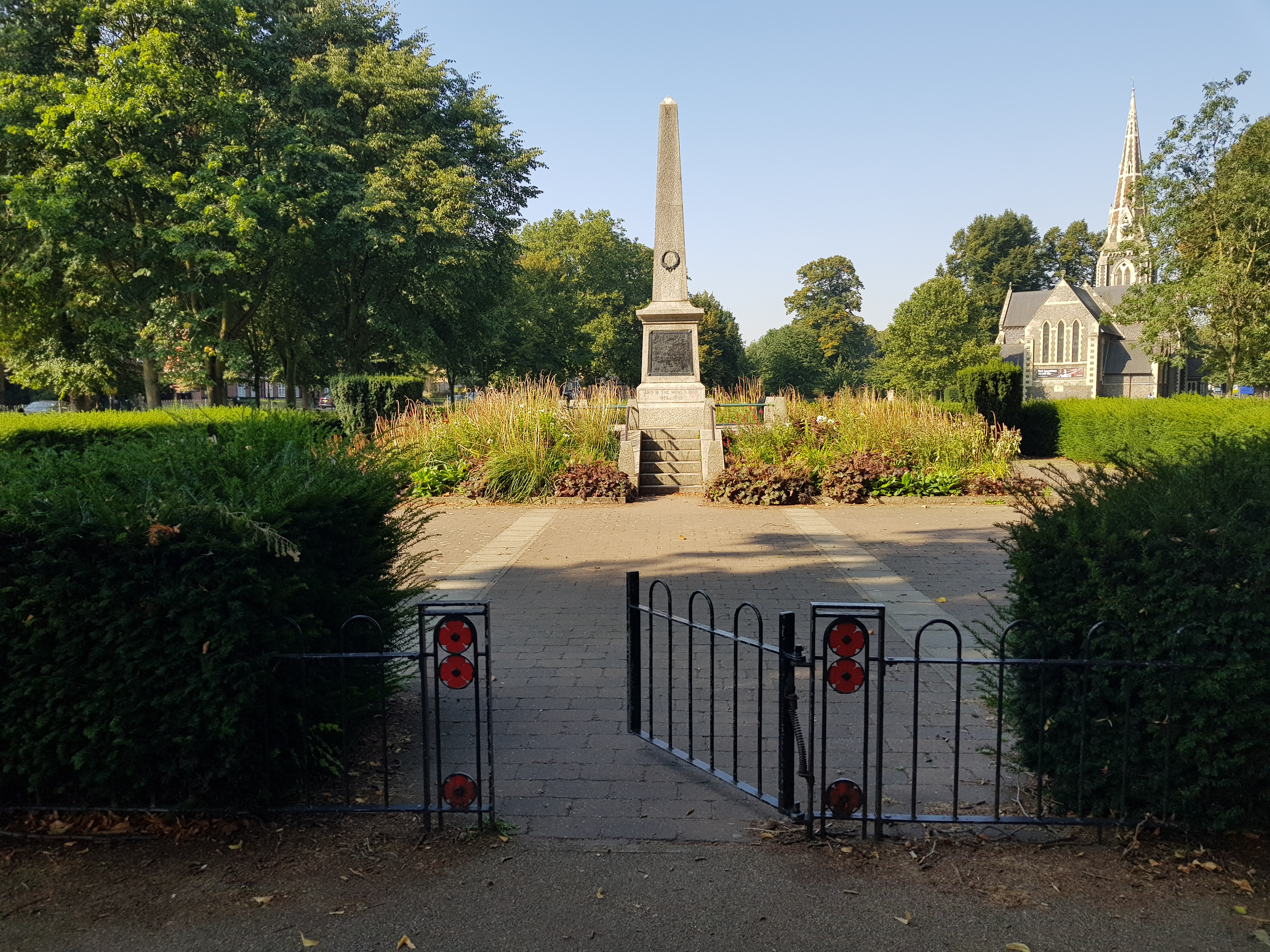
Chiswick War Memorial, 1921, looking west across Turnham Green

== In culture ==
=== Highwayman ===
The 18th century highwayman broadside ballad "Alan Tyne of Harrow" includes the couplet:

"One night by Turnham Green I robbed a revenue collector,
and what I took from him I gave to a widow to protect her".

Charles Dickens's novel A Tale of Two Cities, set in the time of the French Revolution at the end of the 18th century, mentions "that magnificent potentate, the Lord Mayor of London, [who] was made to stand and deliver on Turnham Green, by one highwayman, who despoiled the illustrious creature in sight of all his retinue."

=== Other mentions ===
The song "Suite In C" on the eponymous album McDonald and Giles, which alludes to places in London, includes the line "The sun shone 'til Turnham Green".

The song "Junkie Doll" by Mark Knopfler includes the line "Turnham green, Turnham green, You took me high as I've ever been".

== Residents ==
- Edward Adey, abolitionist, was born here in 1799.
- Peter Brook, director, born here in 1925 and grew up at 27 Fairfax Road.
- Frank Field, politician, was a Labour councillor for Turnham Green from 1964 to 1968.
- E. M. Forster, novelist, lived at 9 Arlington Park Mansions on Turnham Green from 1939 until at least 1961.
- Ugo Foscolo, Venetian writer and poet, key figure of Italian Neoclassicism and Romanticism, died here in 1827.
- Patsy Hendren, (1899-1962), cricketer, was born here.
- Harold Hume Piffard, amateur pioneer aviator, built a plane in 1909 in a shed on Back Common Road
- The painter Vincent van Gogh spent three years in Chiswick in the 1870s, teaching Sunday school pupils in the newly-constructed Chiswick Congregational Church, which was on the site of the Arlington Park Mansions on Turnham Green; he wrote of Chiswick as a "verdant" district of London.
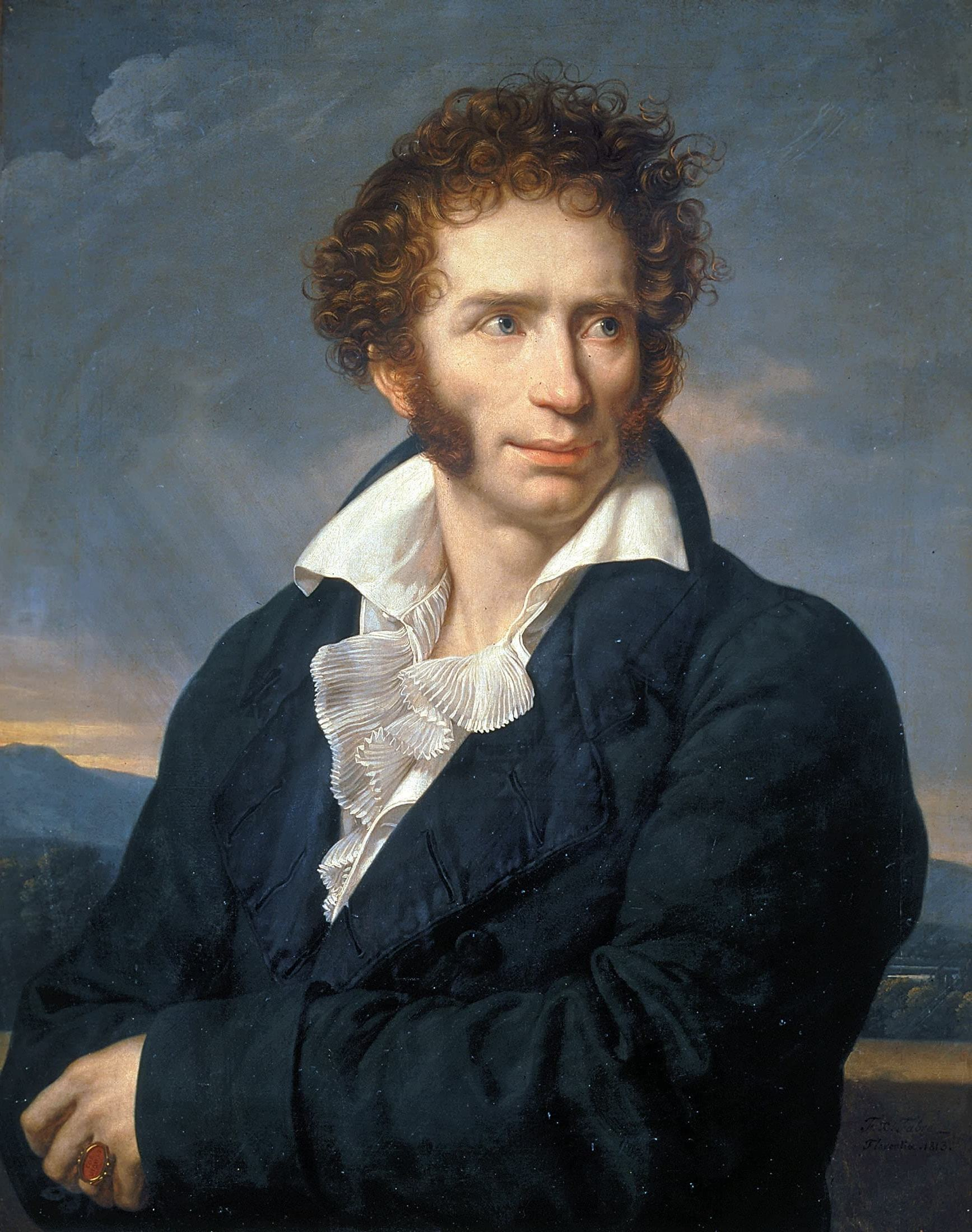
The Italian poet Ugo Foscolo, who died in exile here,
by F.-X.-P. Fabre, 1813

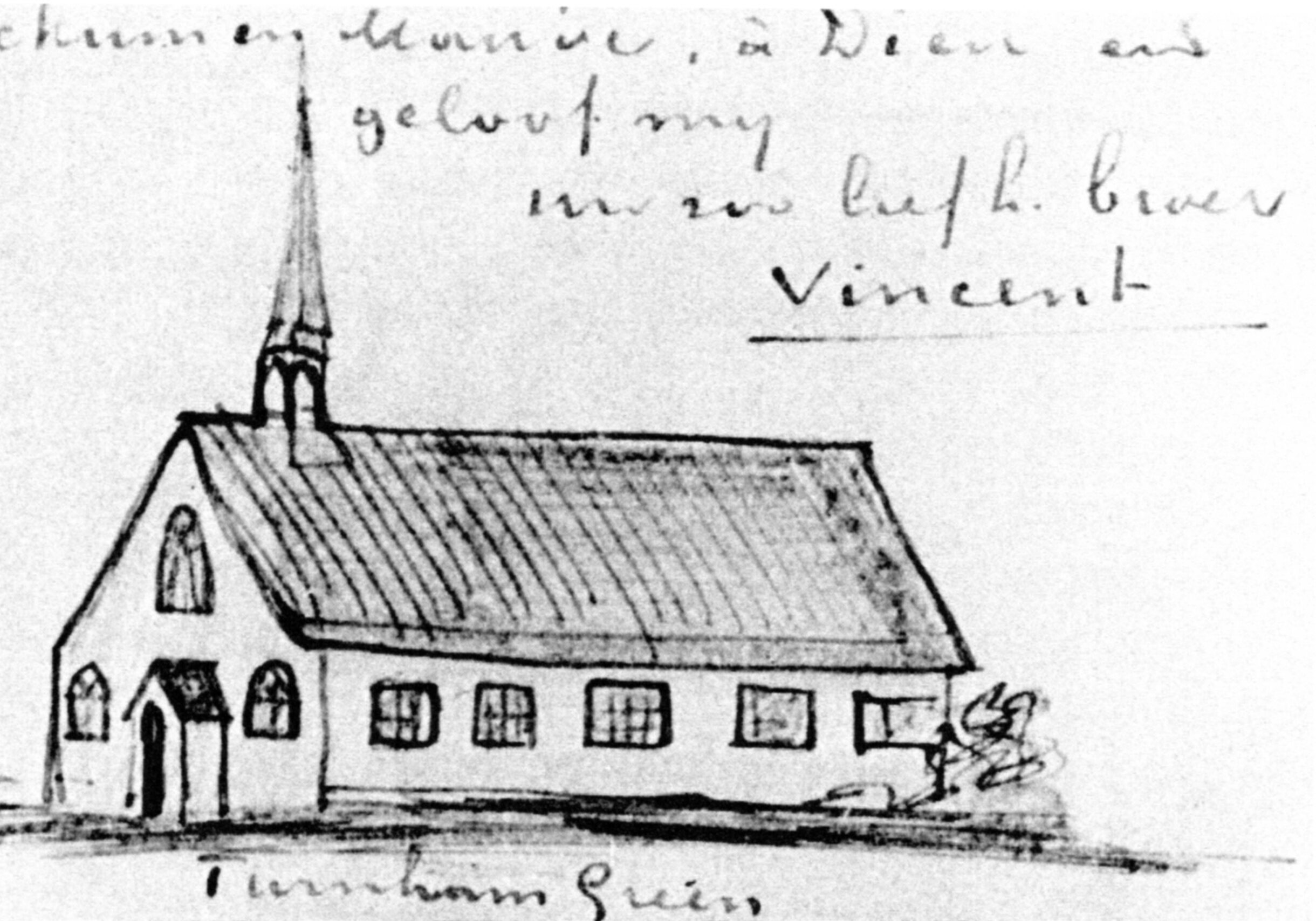
Sketch of Turnham Green Congregational Church by Vincent van Gogh, c. 1875. He taught Sunday school in the iron structure, now replaced by Arlington Park Mansions.

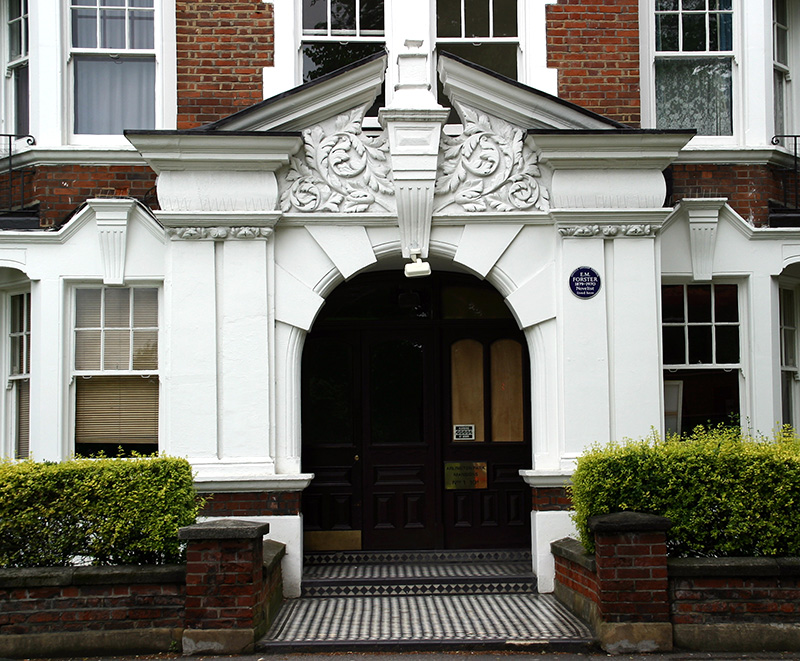
Arlington Park Mansions on Sutton Lane North, facing Turnham Green, with E. M. Forster blue plaque

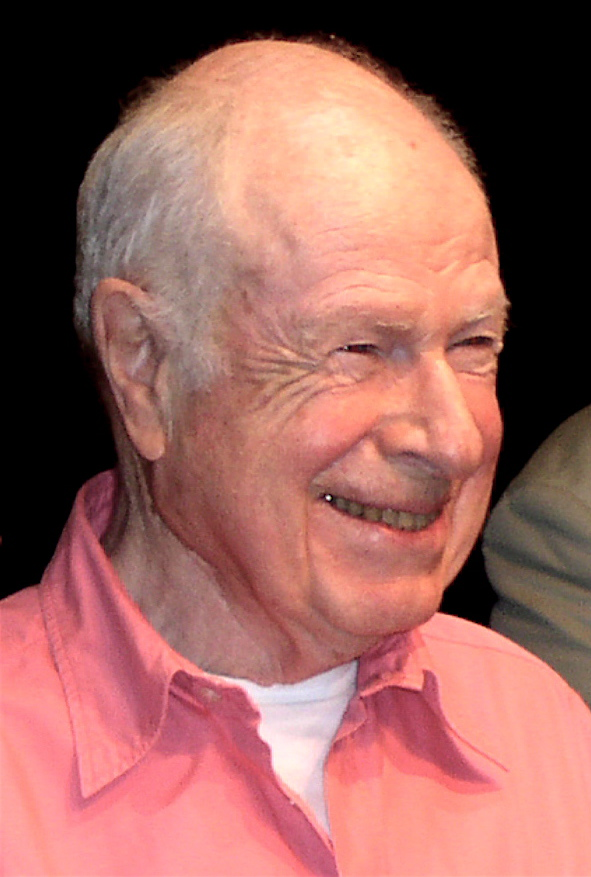
The theatre director Peter Brook was born here.
