= Shaun Glenville =

Irish actor (1884–1968)

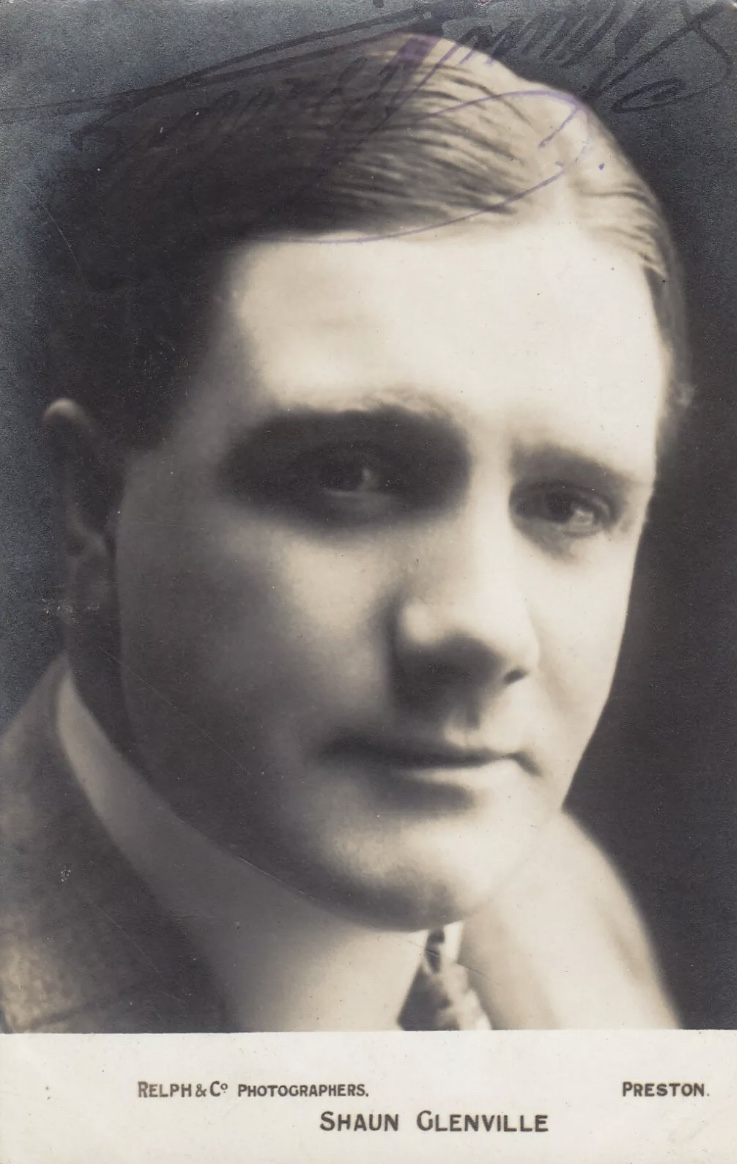
- Glenville in 1909
- Born: John Browne; 16 May 1884; Little Denmark Street, Dublin, Ireland
- Died: 28 December 1968 (aged 84); London, England, U.K.
- Other name: Shaun Glenville-Luck
- Occupation: Actor
- Years active: 1890–1957
- Spouse: Dorothy Ward (m. 1911)
- Children: Peter Glenville
- Relatives: Sister Mary Concepta Lynch (cousin)

Shaun Glenville (born John Browne; 16 May 1884 – 28 December 1968) was an Irish actor who specialised in pantomime performances; he would play the dame while his wife Dorothy Ward would play the principal boy. The music hall historian Christopher Pulling called him one of the 'grand comedians of the music-halls'. He had a successful 62-year career and played in over 40 pantomimes.

== Early life ==
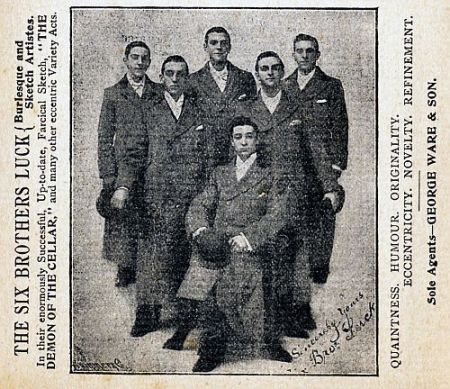
The Six Brothers Luck in 1895 - Glenville standing second from right

He was born as John Browne in Little Denmark Street, Dublin in Ireland where his mother Mary Browne (née Lynch) was the manager of the Mechanics' Theatre, a theatre and music hall that stood on the site later occupied by the Abbey Theatre. Mary Concepta Lynch (Sister Mary Concepta) was a maternal cousin. His father, Henry Browne, was an accountant. He took the stage name 'Glenville' from Glenville House in County Wicklow. His first stage appearance was aged two weeks at the Theatre Royal, Birmingham when he was carried on in Dion Boucicault's play Arrah-na-Pogue.

By 1895, as Shaun Glenville-Luck he had joined the music hall entertainers, burlesque and sketch artists The Six Brothers Luck. By 1906 he was appearing in Variety, and made his London début at the Holborn Empire in 1907. In 1907 with The Six Brothers Luck he toured the United States in their 'farcical sketch' 'The Demon of the Cellar' and a number of other variety acts. The critic of Variety wrote:

"Shaun Glenville Luck makes a capital grotesque comedian and might, under more kindly circumstances, be really funny, but the seltzer-bottle-bladder-slapstick mess that makes up 'The Demon in the Cellar' leaves him stranded. The audience hopes for a minute that the introduction of acrobatics of some sort might enliven the proceedings, but they hoped in vain. It was just childish horseplay and buffoonery, almost without a redeeming virtue."

For a period Glenville was with the company of Fred Karno, and by 1909 he was appearing in pantomimes across Britain. In 1910 he was playing the Dame in the pantomime Little Jack Horner at Newcastle in which the principal boy was played by Dorothy Ward. The two were to marry on 13 May 1911 in a registry office.

After Dorothy converted to Catholicism they held a Catholic marriage ceremony in Dublin the following year. Their son was actor/director Peter Glenville (1913–1996). As a couple they had a long and successful career in pantomime, Ward as one of the leading principal boys and Glenville as 'a pantomime Dame without equal'. For 50 years they played mother and son.

== Acting career ==
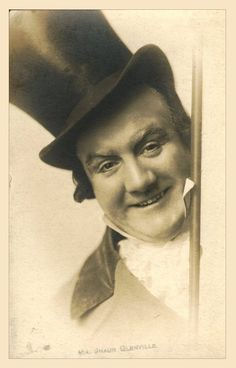
Glenville in character

His stage appearances included: The Gay Lothario (1913); After The Girl and The Light Blues at the Gaiety Theatre, London (1914); the pantomime Humpty Dumpty with his wife Dorothy Ward at the Prince's Theatre, Bristol (1914–15); Razzle Dazzle at the Theatre Royal, Drury Lane (1916); tour of Happy Go Lucky with Dorothy Ward (1918); Sergeant O’Toole in Quality Street at the Shubert Theatre and Doc Sniffkins in The Whirl of New York at the Winter Garden Theatre in New York (1921); The American critic Dorothy Parker was savage in her criticism of Ward's performance in Quality Street - and Glenville fared little better, with Parker writing: 'They have also imported a comedian named Shaun Glenville to add a touch of humor to the proceedings. It is better to say nothing of Mr. Glenville's methods of comedy. One cannot speak of these whiffs of the dead past without breaking down'.

Glenville was in the pantomime Mother Goose at the Palace Theatre, Manchester (1922); with his wife in Jenny at the Empire Theatre, London (1922) and The Apache at the London Palladium and subsequently on tour (1926–27); The Blue Train at the Grand Theatre, Hull with his wife (1927); he was in America (1929); in De La Folie Pure (1930); in La Poupée at Daly's Theatre (1932); in Frivolity (1933); in Private Road at the Theatre Royal, Newcastle (1934); in No, No Nanette at the Hippodrome, London (1936); Mrs. Hubbard in the pantomime Jack and the Beanstalk at the Theatre Royal, Drury Lane (1936); in Venus In Silk and Maritza (1938); in Roses of Piccadilly at the Palace Theatre of Varieties (1944); and in the touring revue Do You Remember? with George Robey and Buster Keaton (1951).

In 1940 he made two films, playing Marius O'Dowd in Dr. O'Dowd and Colonel Pepper in Jailbirds.

== Pantomime ==
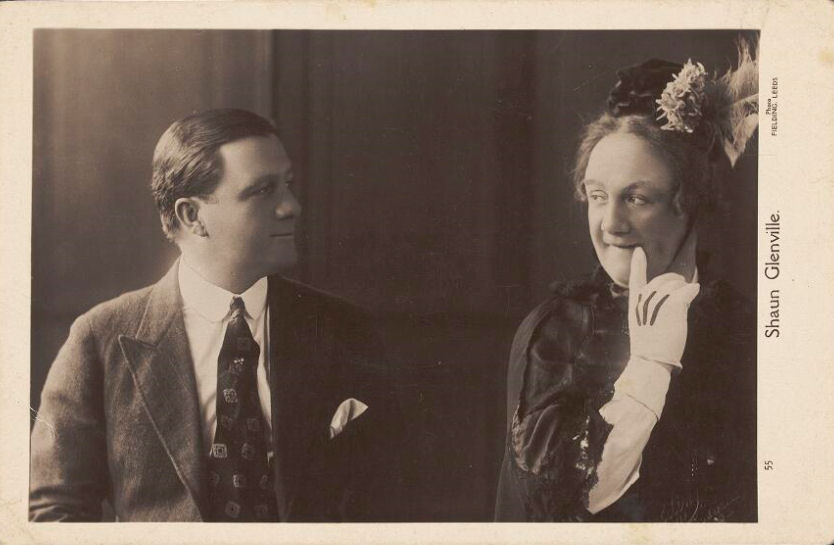
Two portraits of Glenville - one in character as a pantomime dame

His pantomime appearances, with and without his wife, included: Humpty Dumpty at the Theatre Royal, Edinburgh (1910); Jack Horner (Ward & Glenville) Theatre Royal, Newcastle (1910); Jack Horner (Ward & Glenville) Theatre Royal, Glasgow (1911); Tommy Tucker (Ward & Glenville) Royal Court Theatre, Liverpool (1912); Humpty Dumpty (Ward & Glenville) Theatre Royal, Manchester (1913); Humpty Dumpty (Ward & Glenville) Prince's Theatre, Bristol (1914); Old King Cole (Ward & Glenville) Grand Theatre, Leeds (1915); Boy Blue (Ward & Glenville) Theatre Royal, Birmingham (1916); Babes in the Wood (Ward & Glenville) Palace Theatre, Manchester (1917); Jack and the Beanstalk (Ward & Glenville) Alhambra Theatre, Glasgow (1918); Jack and the Beanstalk (Ward & Glenville) Liverpool Olympia (1919); Jack and the Beanstalk (Ward & Glenville) Palace Theatre, Manchester (1920); Mother Goose Alhambra Theatre, Glasgow (1921); Mother Goose (Ward & Glenville) Palace Theatre, Manchester (1922); Mother Goose (Ward & Glenville) Liverpool Olympia (1923); Mother Goose (Ward & Glenville) Hippodrome, London (1924); Mother Goose (Ward & Glenville) Theatre Royal, Newcastle (1925); The Apache (Ward & Glenville) on tour - playing the Christmas Season at the Theatre Royal, Newcastle (1926); Mother Goose (Ward & Glenville) Hippodrome, Sheffield (1927); Cinderella (Ward & Glenville) Liverpool Empire Theatre (1928), and Robinson Crusoe (Ward & Glenville) Palace Theatre, Manchester (1929).

From 1930 onwards he was in Robinson Crusoe (Ward & Glenville) Liverpool Empire Theatre (1930); Queen of Hearts (Ward & Glenville) Grand Theatre, Leeds (1931); Jack and the Beanstalk (Ward & Glenville) King's Theatre, Edinburgh (1932); Jack and the Beanstalk (Ward & Glenville) Theatre Royal, Newcastle (1933); Jack and the Beanstalk(Ward & Glenville) Alexandra Theatre, Birmingham (1934); Jack and the Beanstalk Theatre Royal, Drury Lane (1935); Jack and the Beanstalk Theatre Royal, Glasgow (1936); Jack and the Beanstalk Streatham Hill (1937); Jack and the Beanstalk Golders Green Hippodrome (1938); Jack and the Beanstalk (Ward & Glenville) Alexandra Theatre, Birmingham (1939); Puss in Boots (Ward & Glenville) Wimbledon (1941); Jack and the Beanstalk (Ward & Glenville) Garrick Theatre, Southport (1942); Jack and the Beanstalk (Ward & Glenville) Empire Theatre, Sheffield (1944); Jack and the Beanstalk (Ward & Glenville) Empire Theatre, Leeds (1947); Mother Goose (Ward & Glenville) Empire Theatre, Kingston (1948); Jack and the Beanstalk (Ward & Glenville) Chiswick Empire (1949); Dick Whittington (Ward & Glenville) Empire Theatre, Kingston (1953).

== Song writer ==
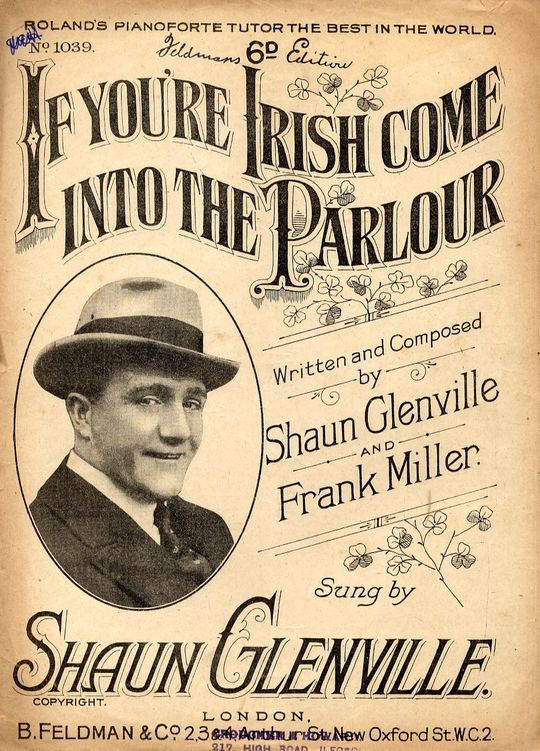
Sheet music for 'If You're Irish Come Into The Parlour' by Glenville and Frank Miller (1919)

Glenville wrote several songs with his and Ward's friend, Fred Godfrey. It is believed that Glenville also performed them but he recorded just two, both in 1915: 'Where Did You Get The Name Of Hennessy?' (Regal G-7607) and 'The Yiddisher Irish Baby' (Levi, Carney, Jacob, Barney, Michael Isaacstein) (Regal G-7221). Various extant sheet music covers and other sources show that Glenville performed at least five other Godfrey songs on stage: 'When An Irishman Goes Fighting' (1914); 'Tommy's Learning French' (sung at a concert in France for the troops in June 1915 during World War I); 'Calling Me Home' (1922); 'My Little-Da-Monk' (1930); and 'It Takes An Irish Heart To Sing An Irish Song' (1932).

== Later years ==
Glenville was a heavy drinker, and various stories are told of his mishaps while under the influence. These include occasional 'memory lapses' during performances including one occasion when as Dame Trott he forgot the words to a song he had sung numerous times on previous performances and had to be prompted by one of the actors in the cow costume. The actor Roy Hudd related an occasion when Binnie Hale as principal boy was appearing as Jack in panto with Glenville as Mrs. Hubbard in Jack and the Beanstalk at the Theatre Royal, Drury Lane in 1936:

'One lunchtime Shaun arrived at the theatre twenty-five minutes late for the matinee - he had over imbibed. The totally professional Binnie collared Shaun and said “Really Shaun, it’s too bad. You come in here twenty-five minutes late, stumbling around in a drunken stupor, smelling like a brewery, slurring your words with your flies undone – and I’ve got to call you Mother!'

Shaun Glenville died in 1968, following his and his wife's joint retirement to London in 1957. He was survived by his wife and their son Peter Glenville (1913–96), an actor, film director and producer of Broadway shows.
