= Mechanics' Theatre =

Mechanics' Hall
- Address: 26 Lower Abbey Street; Dublin 1 Ireland
- Type: theatre and music hall

The Mechanics' Hall, also known as the Hibernian Theatre of Varieties, was a theatre and music hall in Lower Abbey Street, Dublin. It stood at the site of the current Abbey Theatre at 26 Lower Abbey Street.

A theatre or circus has stood on this site on Lower Abbey Street since at least the early 19th century. In the mid-19th century, at the urging of Dublin's gentry, John Classon, an upper-class merchant, acquired the buildings then on the site, one of which had housed a circus, in order to establish a joint concert hall and civic institution for the lower classes. Those buildings became the Music Hall and the Mechanics' Institute. The Music Hall, which could seat 4000 persons, hosted concerts, lectures, and popular entertainments. The renowned black American abolitionist Frederick Douglass lectured at the Music Hall in 1845 during a four-month visit to Ireland. In 1850 and 1851 Pablo Fanque, the popular black equestrian and circus owner (immortalised later in The Beatles' song Being for the Benefit of Mr. Kite!) played to near-capacity Dublin crowds for weeks. During a March 1851 performance of Pablo Fanque's Circus Royal police were called in to quell a riot when playgoers threatened to riot and destroy the theatre in protest to the winner of a "conundrum" contest.

In the later 19th century, in the 1860s, the Music Hall was renamed the Mechanics' Theatre, after the adjacent Mechnanic's Institute. Mary Browne, mother of Shaun Glenville was manager of the theatre for a time. Seán O'Casey once appeared on stage there in a production of The Shaughraun by Dion Boucicault. The theatre was also known during this time as the Hibernian Theatre of Varieties, a name it retained until the building was acquired for the Abbey Theatre at the beginning of the 20th century.

== Other references ==
- Igoe, Vivien. A Literary Guide to Dublin. (Methuen, 1994) ISBN 0-413-69120-9
- Ryan, Philip B. The Lost Theatres of Dublin. (The Badger Press, 1998) ISBN 0-9526076-1-1
