= Peter Glenville =

English director and actor (1913–1996)

- Born: Peter Patrick Brabazon Browne; 28 October 1913; Hampstead, London, England, UK
- Died: 3 June 1996 (aged 82); New York City, New York, U.S.
- Education: Christ Church, Oxford
- Occupations: Director; Actor
- Parent(s): Shaun Glenville (father); Dorothy Ward (mother)
- Website: peterglenville.org

Peter Glenville (born Peter Patrick Brabazon Browne; 28 October 1913 – 3 June 1996) was an English theatre and film director, and actor. He was a prominent director of stage plays on the West End and Broadway in the 1950s. He was nominated for four Tony Awards for his American plays.

In the following decade, he transitioned to become a film director. His first film, The Prisoner (1955), was nominated for Best Film and Best British Film at the 9th British Academy Film Awards (BAFTA).

Glenville was nominated for a Best Director Oscar and a Golden Globe for the 1964 film adaptation of the Jean Anouilh play Becket. He had previously directed the stage version. Two of his other films, Summer and Smoke (1961) and Term of Trial (1962), were both nominated for the Venice Film Festival's Golden Lion. In 2013 critic Rupert Christiansen posthumously described him as a "forgotten giant of mid-20th-century directing."

== Early life ==
Born in Hampstead, London, into a theatrical family, Glenville was the son of Shaun Glenville (born John Browne, 1884–1968), a comedian born in Ireland, and Dorothy Ward, both of whom were pantomime performers. The family were devout Irish Catholics, and Glenville maintained this religion for his entire life.

He attended Stonyhurst College and studied law at Christ Church, Oxford. He was president of the Oxford University Dramatic Society, and performed in many roles for them.

== Career ==
=== In London ===
Glenville performed as an actor in the UK, where he also started directing. Between 1934 and 1947, he appeared in various leading roles "ranging from Tony Pirelli in Edgar Wallace's gangster drama On the Spot and Stephen Cass in Mary Hayley Bell's horror thriller Duet for Two Hands to Romeo, Prince Hal and an intense Hamlet in a production which he also directed for the Old Vic company in Liverpool..."

Glenville's directorial debut on Broadway was Terence Rattigan's The Browning Version in 1949, which starred Maurice Evans.

Other notable productions which followed included The Innocents (1950), the stage adaptation of Henry James's The Turn of the Screw; Shakespeare's Romeo and Juliet, which starred Douglass Watson and Jack Hawkins, and marked the Broadway debut of Olivia de Havilland (1951); Rattigan's Separate Tables (1954), and Georges Feydeau's Hotel Paradiso (1957).

Glenville directed the Bridget Boland play The Prisoner at the Lyceum Theatre, Edinburgh in March 1954, and then at the Globe Theatre in London, starring Alec Guinness. Glenville made his film debut as director with the 1955 adaptation of The Prisoner. Alec Guinness repeated his starring role in the film.

=== In New York ===
In the 1960s, Glenville and his companion "Bill" Smith moved from London to New York and continued to work in the theatre and in films. From that period, he directed the musical Take Me Along (1959–60), based on Eugene O'Neill's play Ah, Wilderness!, with Jackie Gleason, Walter Pidgeon, Robert Morse, Una Merkel and Eileen Herlie. In 1960, Glenville also directed Barbara Bel Geddes and Henry Fonda on Broadway in Silent Night, Lonely Night by Robert Anderson.

In 1961, he directed Jean Anouilh's play Becket, which starred Laurence Olivier as Thomas Becket and Anthony Quinn as Henry II. An erroneous story arose in later years that during the run, Quinn and Olivier switched roles and Quinn played Becket to Olivier's King. Critic Howard Taubman, in his book The Making of the American Theatre, supports this story, as does a biographer of Laurence Olivier.

But Quinn left the production for a film, never having played Becket. Glenville suggested a road tour with Olivier playing Henry II. Olivier happily acceded and Arthur Kennedy took on the role of Becket for the tour and brief return to Broadway.

On Broadway, in 1962–63, Glenville directed Quinn and Margaret Leighton in Tchin-Tchin. This was followed by the musical Tovarich (1963) with Vivien Leigh and Jean-Pierre Aumont. For Dylan, based on the life of Dylan Thomas (1964), Glenville worked again with his frequent collaborator, Sir Alec Guinness. He also directed Edward Albee's adaptation of Giles Cooper's play Everything in the Garden (1967); John Osborne's A Patriot for Me (1969) with Maximilian Schell, Salome Jens and Tommy Lee Jones in his Broadway debut; and Tennessee Williams' Out Cry (1973).

He directed the films Me and the Colonel (1958) with Danny Kaye, Summer and Smoke (1961) with Geraldine Page and Laurence Harvey, Term of Trial (1962) with Laurence Olivier, Simone Signoret and Sarah Miles; Becket (1964) with Richard Burton and Peter O'Toole; Hotel Paradiso (1966) with Guinness and Gina Lollobrigida; and The Comedians (1967) with Elizabeth Taylor, Burton, Guinness, and Peter Ustinov.

=== Final productions and retirement ===
In 1970, Glenville directed another new Terence Rattigan play in the West End, A Bequest to the Nation. In 1971 he began work on the film project of Man of La Mancha, but when he failed to agree with United Artists on the production, he bowed out.

In 1973 he directed the original production of Tennessee Williams's play Out Cry on Broadway. After this he retired and eventually moved to San Miguel de Allende, northern Mexico.

Glenville was nominated for four Tony Awards, two Golden Globe Awards (Becket and Me and the Colonel), one Academy Award (Becket) and one Golden Lion at the Venice Film Festival for Term of Trial.

== Personal life ==
Glenville was for most of his life a closeted homosexual. Glenville met Hardy William Smith (1916–2001) after the end of World War II. Smith, a United States Navy veteran, wanted a career in the theater in the UK. According to his biography at the University of Texas (where his papers are kept), "Glenville and Smith became professional and life partners, with Smith producing and Glenville directing plays for the London stage."

Politically, Glenville identified as a conservative. Historian Gil Troy characterized him as "individualist," "anti-communist," and "anti-totalitarian". Glenville said that he had retired from directing due to a perceived left-wing turn in art and culture, as well as an embrace of Method acting techniques. He disliked the latter and found Method actors difficult to direct.

== Death ==
He died in New York City on 3 June 1996, aged 82, from a heart attack.

== Filmography ==
- The Prisoner (1955)
- Me and the Colonel (1958)
- Summer and Smoke (1961)
- Term of Trial (1962)
- Becket (1964)
- Hotel Paradiso (1966)
- The Comedians (1967)
