= Christ Church, Turnham Green =

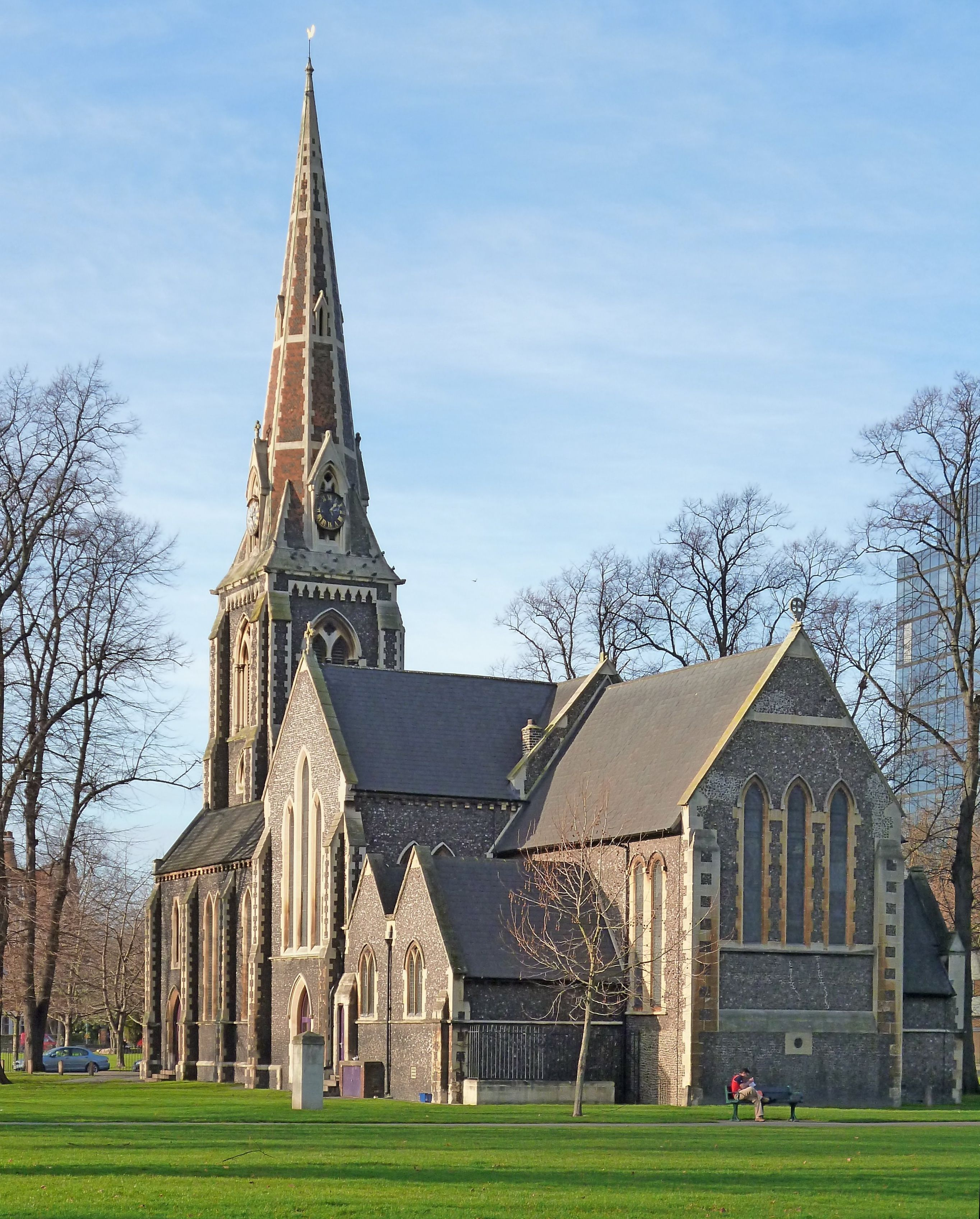
- Christ Church, Turnham Green
- Christ Church, Turnham Green
- 51.4921°N 0.2651°W
- Location: Town Hall Avenue, Chiswick, London
- Country: England
- Denomination: Church of England
- Website: www.christchurchw4.com

History
- Status: Parish church
- Founded: 1843

Architecture
- Functional status: Active
- Designated: 1843
- Architect: Sir George Gilbert Scott
- Style: Gothic Revival

Specifications
- Materials: Flint with stone dressings

Administration
- Diocese: London
- Archdeaconry: Middlesex
- Deanery: Hounslow
- Parish: Turnham Green

Clergy
- Vicar: Nicola Moy

Listed Building – Grade II
- Designated: 21 May 1973
- Reference no.: 1189239

Christ Church, Turnham Green is a Grade II listed Anglican church sited on the eastern half of Turnham Green in Chiswick, west London. The church and the green on which it sits are local landmarks, and are considered of special historic interest by the London Borough of Hounslow. The church was designed in the Gothic Revival style by Sir George Gilbert Scott and his partner William Moffatt; construction was completed in 1843.

== History ==
Christ Church was commissioned in 1841 to serve the growing population of the suburb of Turnham Green who found it inconvenient to walk to St Nicholas Church by the River Thames. The building cost £6,900; the Church Building Commissioners contributed £500 under the Church Building Act 1818, and therefore Christ Church is deemed a Commissioners' church.

A re-ordering took place in the early 1990s, during which the pews were removed and replaced with discrete chairs, and the floor concreted and carpeted. In 2000 the west bays were converted into two-storey community rooms under the supervision of architect Ian Goldsmith.

== Architecture ==
The church was designed in the Gothic Revival style by Sir George Gilbert Scott and his partner William Moffatt; construction was completed in 1843. In 1887 the chancel was extended and given the current square eastern end under architect James Brooks.

The design of Christ Church was praised in the 1841 edition of the journal The Ecclesiologist, which stated that the tower and spire were "peculiarly excellent, and worthy of any ancient architect".

== Daughter church ==
St Alban's Church, Acton Green (St Alban the Martyr), on the green at the northern edge of Chiswick, which had fallen into disuse, was restored and rededicated in 2016, and now forms part of the Christ Church ministry.
