= Edward Adey =

English Baptist minister and abolitionist (1799–1876)

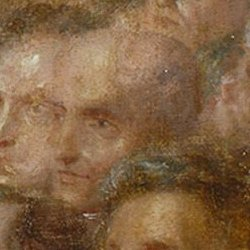
- Edward Adey in 1840 at the convention
- Born: 31 March 1799; Turnham Green
- Died: 28 April 1876 (aged 77); Leighton Buzzard
- Occupation: Baptist minister
- Parent(s): Daniel and Catherine Adey

Edward Adey (1799 - 1876) was a Baptist minister and abolitionist.

== Biography ==
Edward Adey was born on 31 March 1799 in Turnham Green, but was christened in Hammersmith the following month. He was the second child and son of Daniel and Catherine Adey. Coming from a religious family he eventually trained at Newport Pagnall, like his elder brother, John, as a minister before taking up a position in the Baptist church. His first appointment was in Leighton Buzzard, a job he held for 25 years and the place where he would eventually be buried.

Adey took charge of the congregation of baptists at Lake Street in 1828 who came from an older congregation who had been meeting since 1775. In 1832 there was a split in the church as some objected to the pastor. A new stricter chapel was formed that did not allow the open communion that was practised at Lake Street. Today the chapel, or its 1864 replacement for 500 people, no longer stands, but it is recognised in the name of the Chapel Mews that are now on that site.

Adey was an active member of the Anti-Slavery Society advising on such matters as how to free those slaves who were held in the Danish colonies. He was known to William Wilberforce and he is one of the people chosen to appear in Haydon's picture of the 1840 Anti-slavery convention where the aged Thomas Clarkson is shown addressing the first international convention on anti-slavery.

One of the people who Adey preached with on a tour of the south Midlands was William Knibb, a Jamaican missionary. Knibb also attended the 1840 Anti-Slavery convention.

Many notable people are in this painting including Lady Byron, Daniel O'Connell, Thomas Fowell Buxton and Richard Tapper Cadbury (who was just behind Adey in the painting).

In 1863, Adey was instrumental in forming a Baptist church in Brackley in Northamptonshire.

Adey married Mary Linnell in 1835 and had four children although one died young. He died in Leighton Buzzard on 28 April 1876.
