= The Whirl of New York =

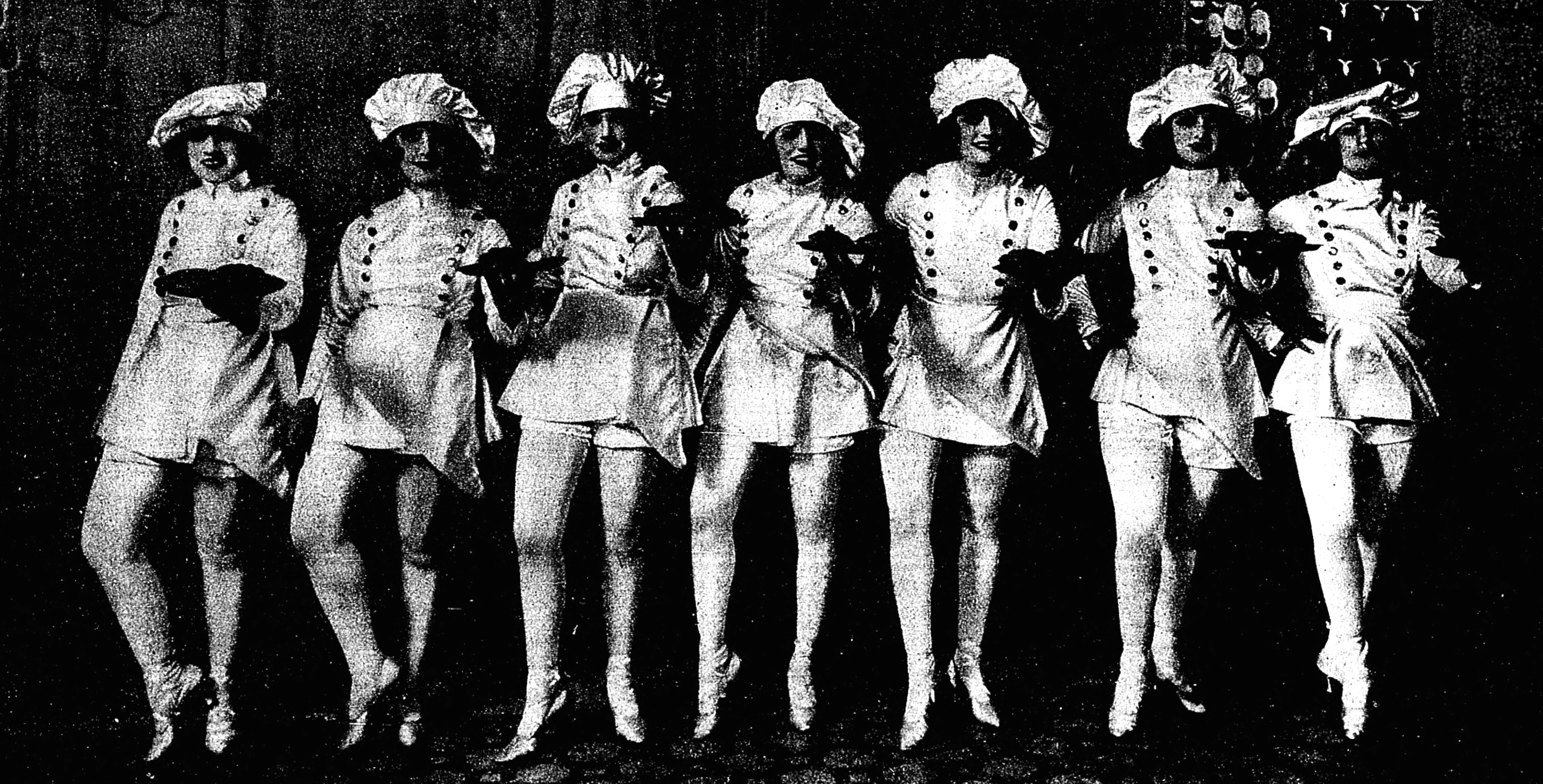
Scene from The Whirl of New York depicted in a contemporary newspaper.

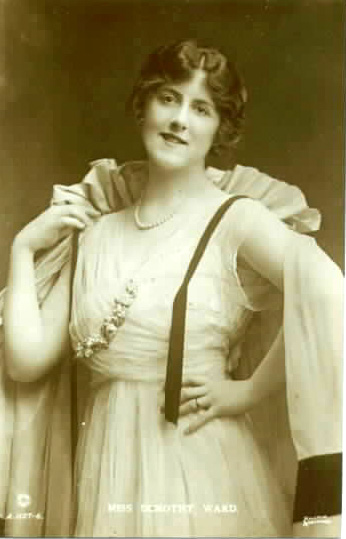
Dorothy Ward, who played the role of Cora Angélique in the premiere of The Whirl of New York.

The Whirl of New York is a Broadway musical that premiered at Winter Garden Theatre on June 13, 1921. It was an expanded and substantially re-worked version of The Belle of New York (1897, music by Gustave Kerker with book and lyrics by Hugh Morton). The show was billed not as a revival but as "founded on The Belle of New York.". The new version had music by Gustave Kerker, Al Goodman and Lew Pollack; book and lyrics by Hugh Morton and Edgar Smith; additional music by Leo Edwards; and additional lyrics by Sidney D Mitchell, Cyrus Wood and Cliff Friend. It opened to favourable reviews and ran for 124 performances.

== Premiere cast ==
The premiere cast included:

- John T. Murray (Ichabod Bronson)
- J. Harold Murray (Harry Bronson)
- Dorothy Ward (Cora Angélique)
- Nancy Gibbs (Violet Gray)
- Joe Keno (Blinky Bill McGuire)
- Rosie Green (Mamie Clancy)
- Louis Mann (Karl Von Pumpernick)
- Shaun Glenville (Doc Sniffkins)
