= Chiswick Town Hall =

Municipal building in London, England

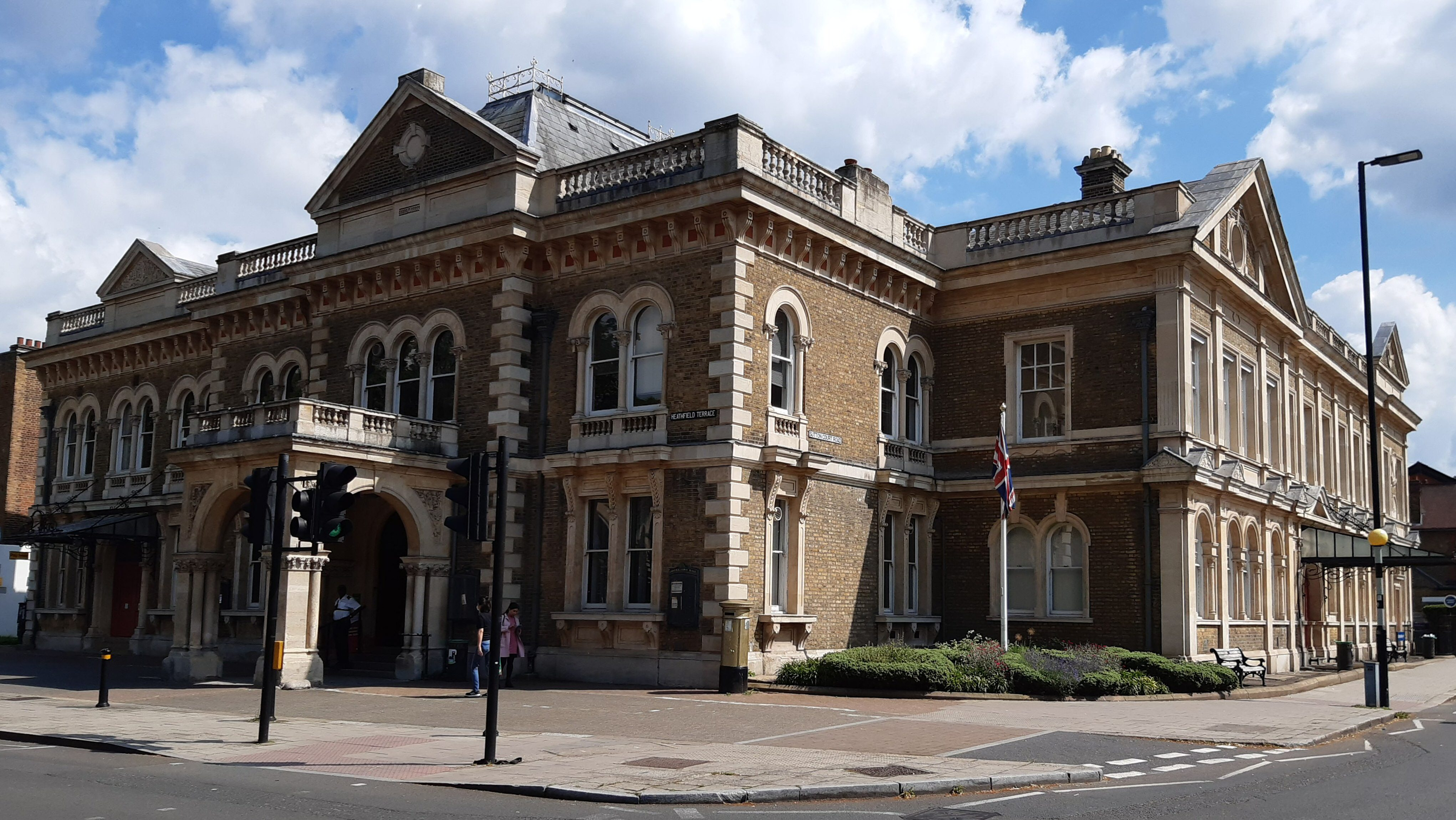
- Chiswick Town Hall

- Shown in Hounslow
- 51°29′28″N 0°15′56″W
- Location: Heathfield Terrace, Chiswick

History
- Built: 1876

Site notes
- Architect: William Joshua Trehearne
- Architectural style: Italianate style

Listed Building – Grade II
- Designated: 11 May 1994
- Reference no.: 1260615

Chiswick Town Hall stands on Heathfield Terrace, Chiswick, London, facing Turnham Green. It is a Grade II listed building.

== History ==
In the mid 19th century St Nicholas Parish Council had met in a variety of different locations including, latterly, the Boys' National School at Turnham Green. After parish leaders found that this arrangement was inadequate for their needs, they elected to construct a purpose-built vestry hall: a site on Turnham Green, which had previously been open land, was purchased for the benefit of the parish in 1874.

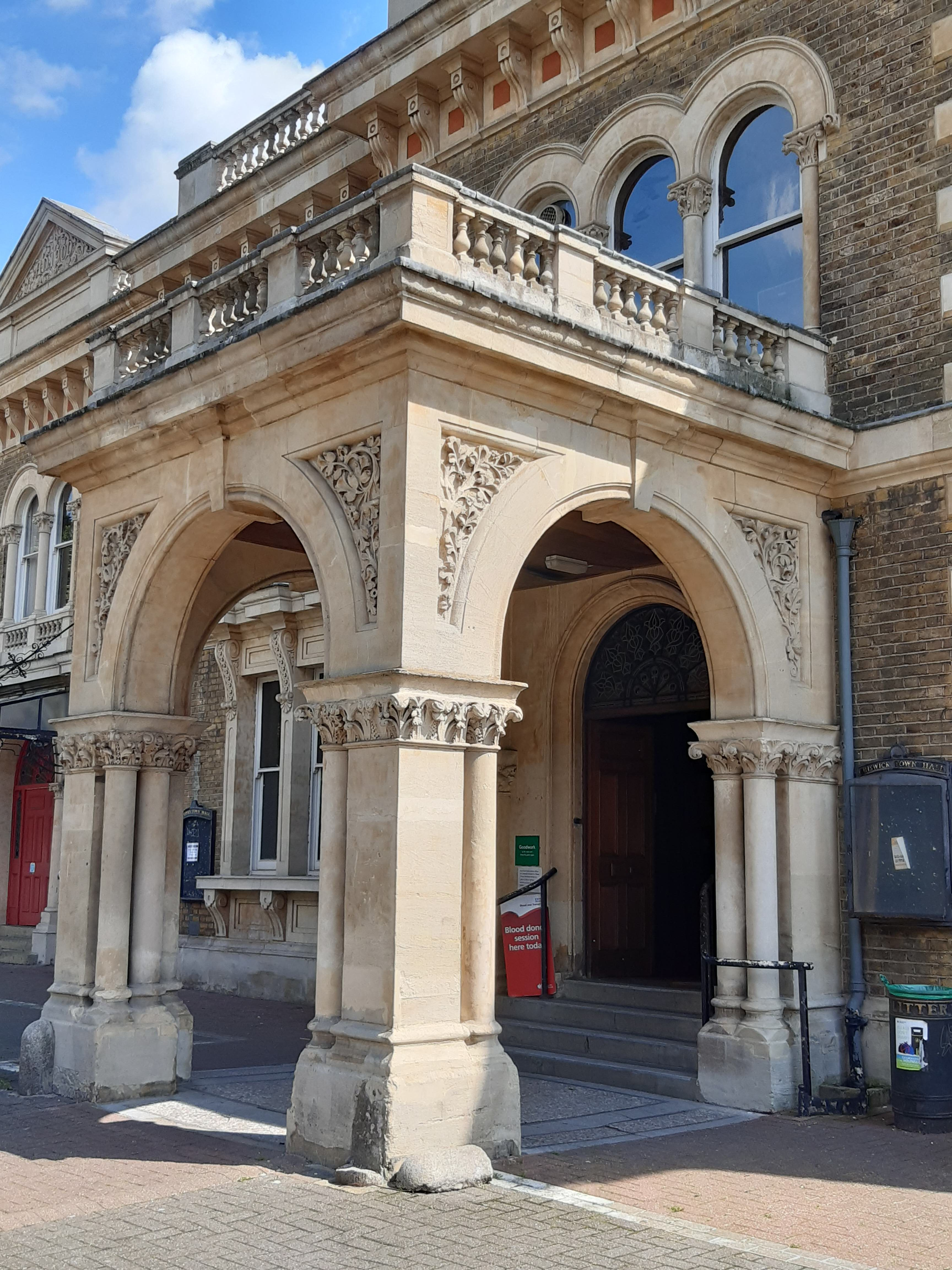
Chiswick Town Hall's porte cochère

The new building was designed by William Joshua Trehearne in the Italianate style and opened in 1876. The design involved a symmetrical main frontage with three bays facing onto Heathfield Terrace; the central section featured a porte cochère flanked by Corinthian order columns on the ground floor; there were three round arched windows on the first floor with a pediment above. Internally, the principal room was the council chamber on the first floor.

After the area became an urban district in 1896, civic leaders decided that it would be necessary to extend the building. They launched a fund raising campaign to establish a lasting memorial to celebrate Queen Victoria's Diamond Jubilee; at least part of the fund, to which the Duke of Devonshire had been a significant donor, was used to finance the extension. The extension was designed by the council surveyor, Arthur Ramsden, with three extra bays to the east on Heathfield Terrace and an extra nine bays along Sutton Court Road; the principal rooms in the extension were the main assembly hall, initially known as the Devonshire Hall, and a large reception room, which became known as the Hogarth Hall. The enlarged complex re-opened as Chiswick Town Hall in February 1901.

In December 1901, a bust of the local painter, William Hogarth, which had been commissioned by the philanthropist, John Passmore Edwards, was unveiled by the painter, Sir William Richmond, in the newly named Hogarth Room.

The building became the town hall of Chiswick Urban District in 1927 and of the merged Municipal Borough of Brentford and Chiswick in 1932 but ceased to be the local seat of government when the enlarged London Borough of Hounslow was formed in 1965. It was subsequently used as a local register office until Feltham Lodge became the main register office for London Borough of Hounslow and it still remains an approved venue for marriage and civil partnership ceremonies. A Citizens Advice Bureau was also established in the building. A programme of restoration works was carried out by T&B Contractors to plans by A3 Architects in 2010.
