= Dorothy Ward =

English actress (1890–1987)

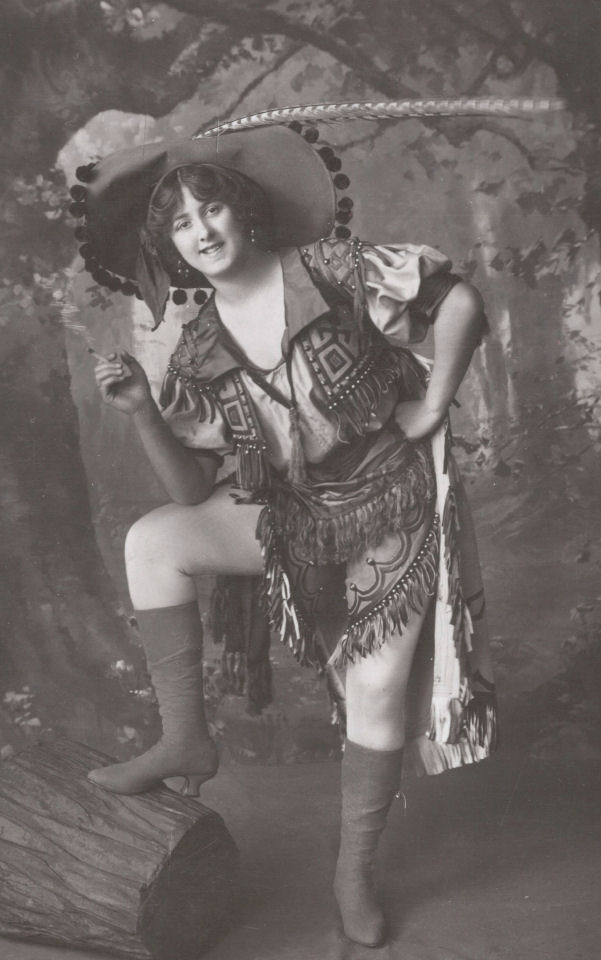
- Ward as Robin Hood in The Babes in the Wood (1909)
- Born: 26 April 1890; Aston, Birmingham, England
- Died: 30 March 1987 (aged 96); Hendon, London, England
- Occupation: Actress
- Years active: 1906–1957
- Spouse: Shaun Glenville (m. 1911; died 1968)
- Children: Peter Glenville

Dorothy Ward (26 April 1890 – 30 March 1987) was an English actress who specialised in pantomimes, playing the principal boy roles, while her husband Shaun Glenville would play the dame roles. She had a successful 52 year career and played in over 40 pantomimes between 1905 and 1957.

== Early career ==
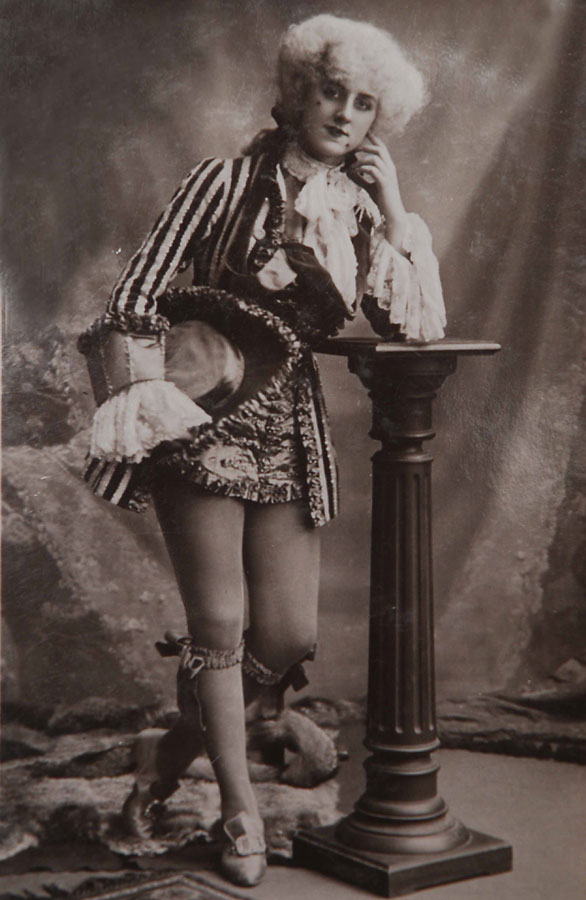
Ward as Prince Charming in Cinderella (1906)

Ward was born in Aston (now part of Birmingham), Warwickshire, on 26 April 1890, to Eliza (née Millichamp, 1867–1946) and Edwin Ward (1866–), a wholesale bottler. When she was 14 she was taken to see Jack and the Beanstalk with Ada Reeve as the principal boy, and from that moment she decided on a career in pantomime. She made her stage début at the Alexandra Theatre in Birmingham in 1905, aged 15, playing Zenobia in the pantomime Bluebeard.

Following her success in this Robert Courtneidge offered her the role of Betty in the Edwardian musical comedy The Dairymaids at the Apollo Theatre in London (1906) opposite Phyllis Dare and Walter Passmore. The Christmas season of 1906 saw her as Dandini in the pantomime Cinderella at Edinburgh, where she understudied the role of Prince Charming; when the principal player fell ill Ward had her first opportunity to play principal boy. She next created the non-speaking role of Etoff in Edward German's comic opera Tom Jones at the Apollo Theatre in London (1907), and in 1908 she played Princess Helene in the operetta A Waltz Dream at the Hicks Theatre. This was followed by George Edwardes's production of Havana at the Gaiety Theatre before joining the cast of The Gay Gordons at the Aldwych Theatre.

In his history of Daly's Theatre D. Forbes Winslow wrote of this period:

Dorothy said one of the happiest times of her life was when she was with George Edwardes at the Gaiety Theatre, understudying at the age of sixteen several parts in Havana. She got her chance to play the lead. Edwardes gave her her first big chance in London as the Princess in A Waltz Dream. After the first performance he presented her with a quaint ring: it consisted of two large diamonds, set one on each side of a shamrock leaf in emeralds – similar to the one he gave to Lily Elsie when she made her first big hit in The Merry Widow.

She played Robin Hood in the pantomime The Babes in the Wood at the Prince of Wales Theatre in her home town of Birmingham (1909–10) followed by the title role in the pantomime Little Jack Horner at Newcastle in (1910–11) in which the Dame was played by the young Irish actor Shaun Glenville. The two married in 1911. Their son was actor/director Peter Glenville (1913–1996).

== Peak years ==
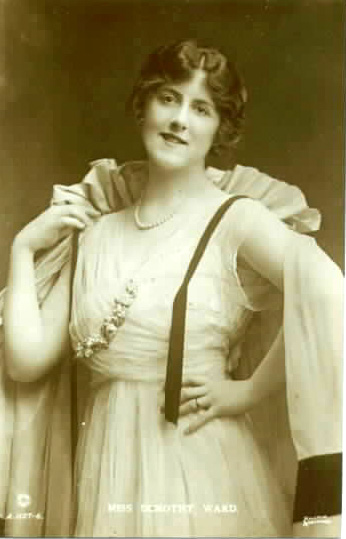
Dorothy Ward as Cora Angélique in The Whirl of New York (1921)

Ward became noted as one of the leading principal boys, while Glenville as "a pantomime Dame without equal". Thus, for 50 years they often played mother and son. They appeared in pantomimes together until 1914 when Ward was cast as Louise opposite Fay Compton and Cicely Courtneidge in The Cinema Star, which toured the provinces before opening at the Shaftesbury Theatre in London. In 1916 she was in We’re All In It at the London Hippodrome, touring throughout 1917 before being reunited with Glenville in Happy Go Lucky (1918). For much of 1921 she was with her husband in New York where she was Phoebe Throssel in Quality Street at the Shubert Theatre and Cora Angélique in The Whirl of New York at the Winter Garden Theatre. Ward's performance in Quality Street gained harsh reviews from some critics, with Dorothy Parker commenting; 'They have brought over from England a lady named Dorothy Ward to play the title role of Phoebe in Quality Street and, considering what a first-class passage costs these days, it seems really staggering to think of the money that could have been saved by the simple means of letting her stay happily at home... she has been billed by a hysterical press agent, as "England's greatest comédienne". I don't pretend to be right up to the minute with what is going on upon the British stage, but I can say with perfect safety that if she is England's greatest comédienne, then I'm Mrs. Fiske'. Another critic wrote that Ward's was the season's 'most astonishing piece of casting' and that she approached her role in the 'dainty' operetta 'in the frenzied manner usually reserved for the mad scenes in Italian opera'. Her husband fared little better.

Ward and Glenville had been cast in Mother Goose at the Alhambra Theatre in Glasgow for the Christmas pantomime in 1921. At the last minute, however, Ward was called to replace Clarice Mayne in Jack and the Beanstalk at the London Hippodrome opposite George Robey. In 1926 the couple were in The Apache at the Theatre Royal, Newcastle before taking it on tour and then opening at the London Palladium in 1927. Next they were next on tour in The Blue Train. She was Cora Angélique in a revival of The Belle of New York at Daly's Theatre in London (1931), and followed this as Lady Holyrood in a revival of Florodora. Next she was Nan in A Country Girl, followed by The Duchess of Dantzic. With Glenville she ended the 1932 season in La poupée.

At the outbreak of World War II Ward was among the first entertainers to join ENSA, for whom she toured France entertaining the troops. By now the couple were quite wealthy and included a Rolls-Royce car among their possessions. The actor Roy Hudd wrote of Ward's appearance as Colin the Miller's Son in a pantomime of Puss in Boots in 1941:

At the dress rehearsal she made her first entrance in her "poor boy" costume but wearing a positive fistful of diamond rings. She was very proud of how well she'd done, and wanted everyone else to know it too. At the end of the run-through, Emile Littler said, "Dorothy, darling, you’re supposed to be the poor miller’s son. I think we should dispense with the diamond rings".

Dorothy said nothing, but on the opening night she came on with her hands behind her back and said, "Here I am, Colin the poor miller’s son". She then waved her bejewelled hands at the audience and added, "and look what the Good Fairy keeps giving me!"

From October 1944 to January 1945 Ward played Loretta Zelma in Meet Me Victoria at the Victoria Palace Theatre opposite Lupino Lane. By the 1950s Ward was beginning to wonder if she could still carry off the principal boy roles. In an interview in 1954 while appearing as Dick Whittington at the Kingston Empire she was reluctant to discuss her date of birth, saying, "I want audiences to enjoy the pantomime – not to wonder if I’ve got my own teeth!" In 1957 she made her last appearance as principal boy at the age of 66 playing the lead in Dick Whittington at the Pavilion Theatre in Liverpool, bringing to an end a career in which she had played principal boy almost continuously since 1905.

== Songs and recordings ==
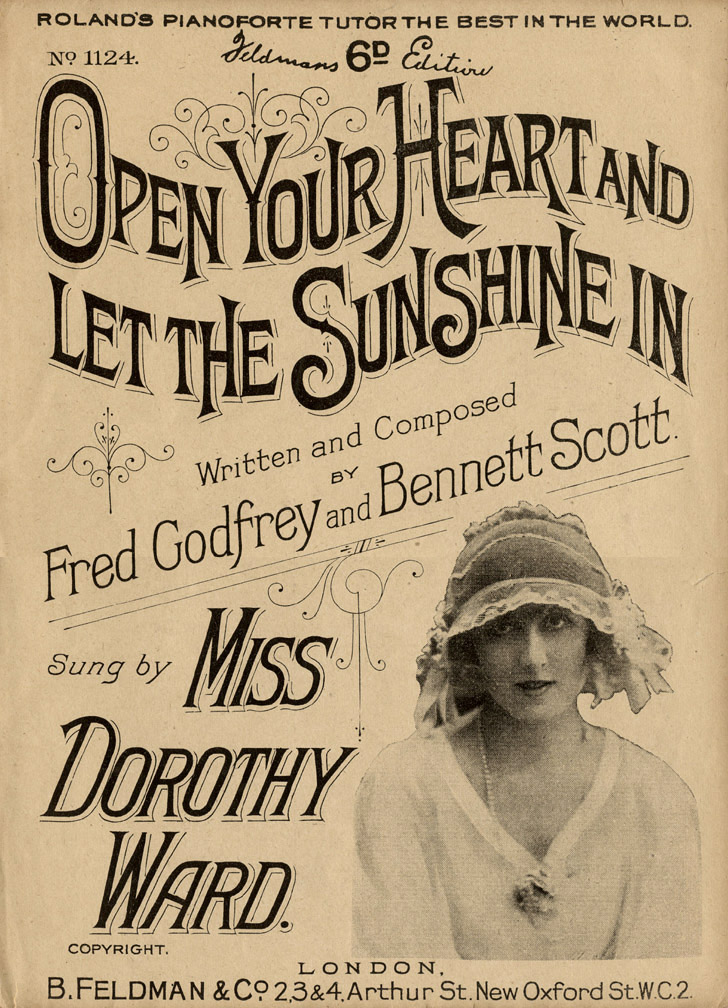
Sheet music cover for 'Open Your Heart And Let The Sunshine In' (1920)

During her career Ward performed a number of songs by her and Glenville's friend, Fred Godfrey, including: 'Meet Me Jenny When The Sun Goes Down' in pantomime in Belfast in 1908. Ward is known to have recorded four Godfrey songs: 'Blue Eyes' (Regal G-7170, 1915); 'Tommy’s Learning French' (Regal G-7219, 1915); 'I Love My Motherland' (Regal G-7418, 1916); and 'Take Me Back To Dear Old Blighty' (Regal G-7398, 1916). Also, from information gathered from sheet music covers and other sources she also sang Godfrey’s 'It’s The Way They Have In The Navy' (1914); 'I’m Coming Back To Old Kilkenny' (1915); 'Take Me Back To Your Heart' (1915); 'You Were The First One To Teach Me To Love' (1916); 'Down Texas Way' (1917); 'Open Your Heart And Let The Sunshine In' (1920); 'Till You Come Back Again' (1926); 'Arm In Arm Together' (1931); and 'There Is Always A Silver Lining' (1939).

== Later years ==
She was interviewed as a castaway on the BBC Radio programme Desert Island Discs on 23 December 1954. She and her husband jointly retired to London in 1957, where Glenville died in 1968.

Music hall historian W. Macqueen-Pope called her:

a handsome and striking woman, with auburn hair, wonderful carriage and fine figure. ... Tights become her, they are second nature to her and she understands pantomime and its topsy turviness. To see her as "Jack" in Jack and the Beanstalk defy the giant outside his castle, wearing shining armour and then join in mortal combat with him in his own kitchen, clad in trailing clouds of gauze and silk, is to witness true pantomime. ... [She] left the halls plenty of fine songs.

Dorothy Ward died aged 96 in Hendon in London on 30 March 1987.
