= Old Pack Horse =

Public house in Chiswick, London

Coordinates: 51.4929°N 0.2667°W

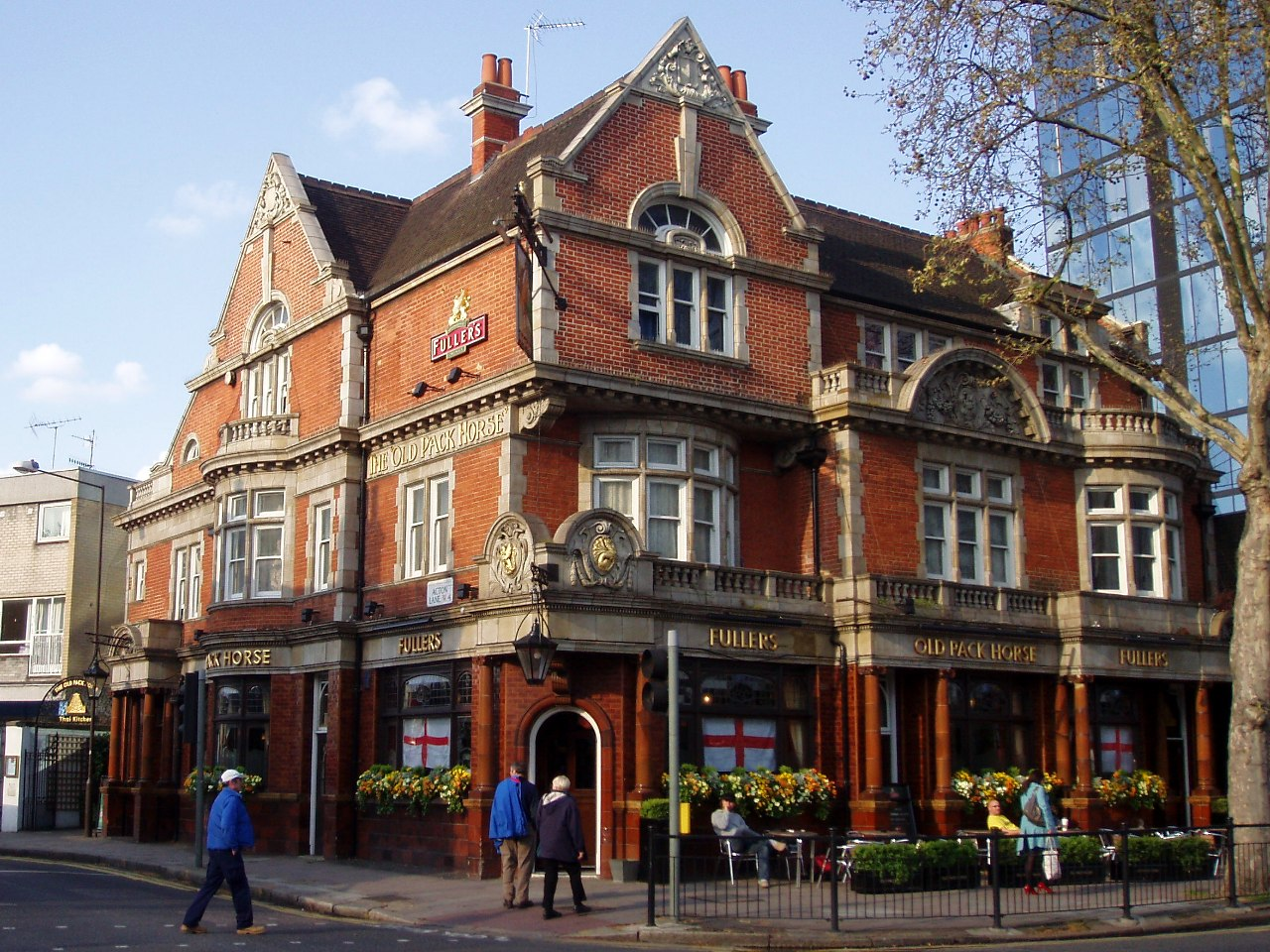
The Old Pack Horse

The Old Pack Horse is a Grade II listed public house in a prominent position on the corner of Chiswick High Road and Acton Lane in Chiswick, London.

== Architecture ==
The current structure was built in 1910 by the architect Nowell Parr, the house architect of Fuller, Smith & Turner, who ran the local brewery. It is a red brick structure of three storeys, with decorative terracotta and coloured tiles. It has remained unaltered since its construction. The building historian Nikolaus Pevsner writes that it has "plenty of jolly terracotta detail and bowed ground-floor windows".

The English Heritage listing describes it as the "best preserved example of a public house by the Fuller, Smith and Turner house architect".

== History ==
The first pub on this site, the "West Country Packhorse", was granted a licence in 1759. It was renamed as the "Lower Pack Horse" in 1790, and again to be the "Pack Horse" sometime before 1811. It was acquired by Fuller, Smith & Turner in 1808.

The Friends of Turnham Green cited the overshadowing of the pub in their successful objection to the development of the whole of the adjacent part of Chiswick High Road and area behind it in 2015. In 2024, the pub was extensively refurbished, reopening on 4 April.

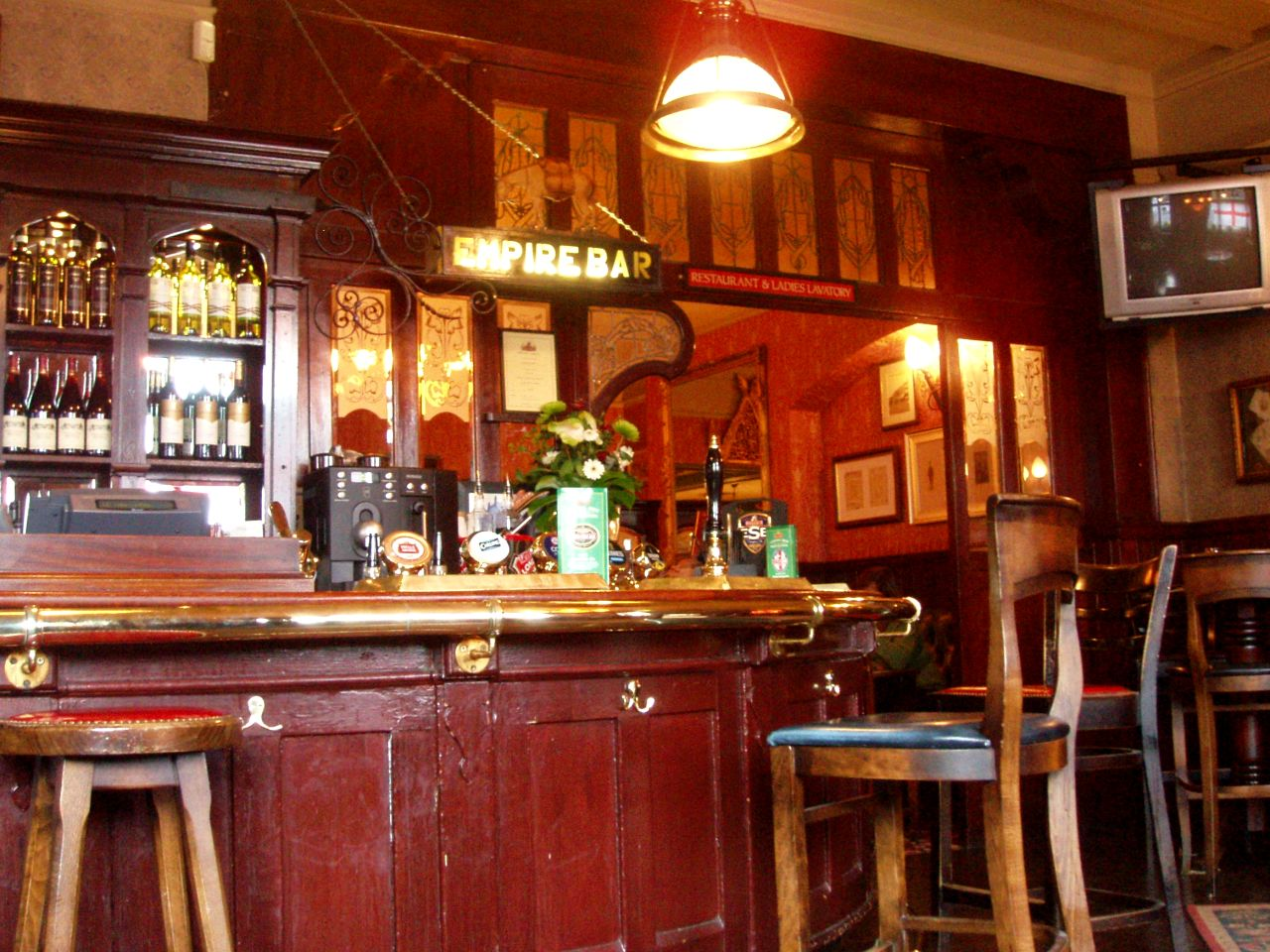
Interior, 2008

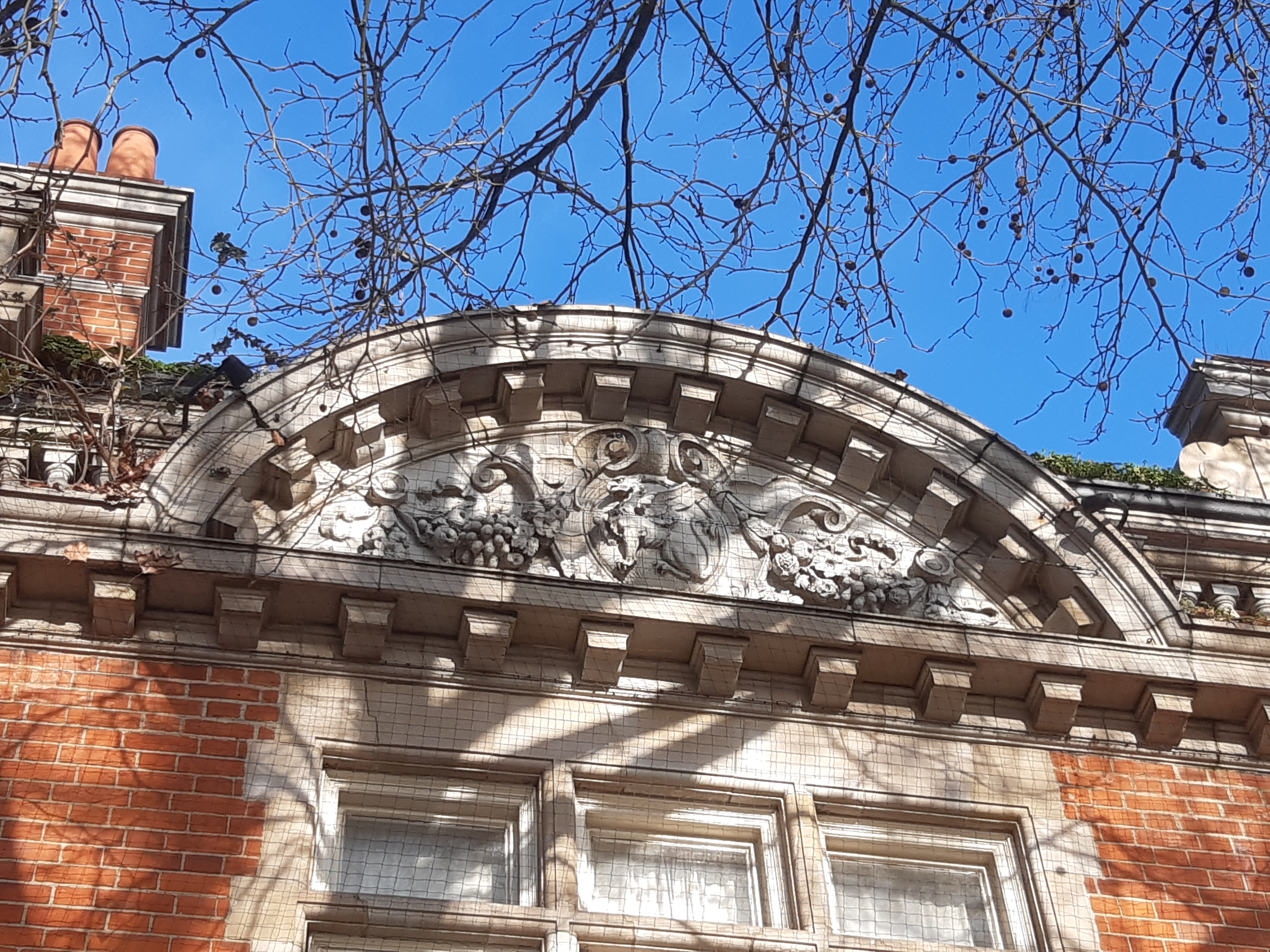
Terracotta wall decoration with swags

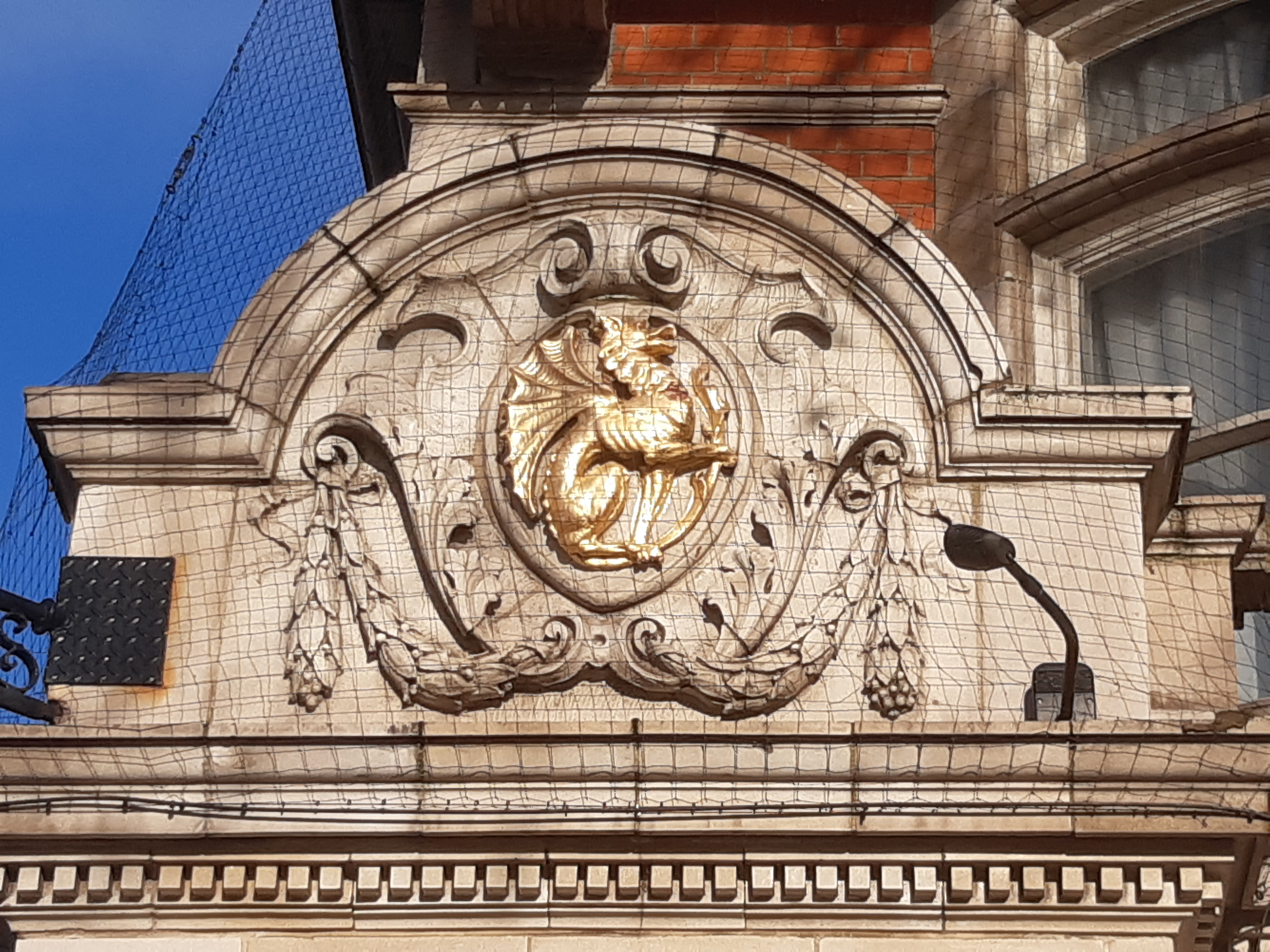
Terracotta corner decoration with golden griffin emblem
