= Principal boy =

Breeches role in theatre

Vesta Tilley as a principal boy

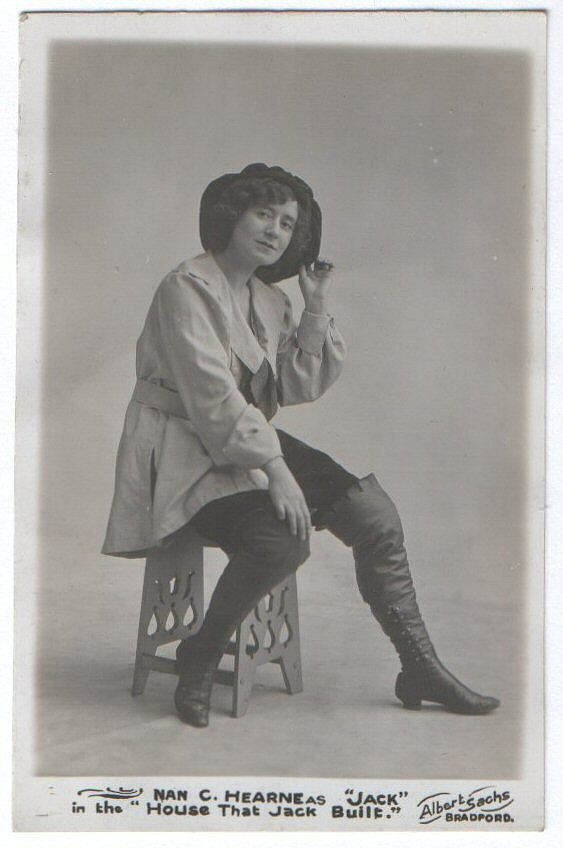
Actress Nan Hearne as Jack in the pantomime The House That Jack Built

A principal boy is the role of a young male protagonist of a play filled by an actress in boy's clothes (a breeches role), typical of pantomime and the music hall: forms of British theatre during the Regency and Victorian eras.

The earliest example is "Miss Ellington" who in 1852 appeared in The Good Woman in the Wood by James Planché to the consternation of a reviewer. She was followed by other music hall and burlesque entertainers, such as Harriet Vernon described as "a magnificent creature, who was willing to show her ample figure as generously as the conventional tights and trunks of the day allowed" and thus setting the standard of good legs on display and nominally male costume which emphasized her figure.

The tradition grew out of laws restricting the use of child actors in London theatre and the responsibility carried by such lead roles. A breeches role was also a rare opportunity for an early 20th-century actress to wear a costume revealing the legs covered only in tights, potentially increasing the size of the audience. The practice of having a female play the principal boy has become less common: it's 'been put down to political correctness, as well as greater knowledge among children about homosexual relationships'.

Although not written as a pantomime, Peter Pan, or The Boy Who Wouldn't Grow Up is often produced as one, with the tradition of a female principal boy.

== List of notable principal boys ==
- Maud Boyd
- Joanne Campbell first black actress in the role in UK
- Kate Everleigh
- Nellie Farren
- Lil Hawthorne
- Hy Hazell
- Queenie Leighton
- Madge Lessing
- Marie Loftus
- Ouida MacDermott
- Nellie Navette
- Ada Reeve
- Nellie Stewart
- Vesta Tilley
- Harriet Vernon
- Dorothy Ward

== See also ==
- Cross-gender acting
- Breeches role
- Pantomime dame
- Drag king
