= Winckelmann =

Winckelmann may refer to:

== People ==
- George Winckelmann (1884–1962), Finnish lawyer and a diplomat
- Hans Winckelmann (1881–1943), German operatic tenor and director
- Johann Joachim Winckelmann (1717–1768), German art historian and archaeologist
- Johann Just Winckelmann (1620–1699), German writer and historian
- Maria Margarethe Winckelmann (1670–1720), German astronomer

== Other uses ==
- 11847 Winckelmann, a minor planet
- Portrait of Winckelmann, a 1764 painting of Johann Joachim Winckelmann by Angelica Kauffmann

== See also ==
- Winkelmann, a surname
- Winkleman, a surname
