= Winkelmann =

Winkelmann or Winkelman is a German and Jewish surname that referred to someone who either lived at a corner or owned a shop there. Notable people with the surname include:

- Anton Winkelmann (born 2003), German canoeist
- Babe Winkelman, American fisherman
- Bobby Winkelman, American guitarist
- Brett Winkelman (born 1986), American basketball player
- Christian Herman Winkelmann, American catholic bishop
- Eduard Winkelmann (1838–1896), German historian
- Helen Winkelmann (born 1962), New Zealand jurist
- Henri Winkelman (1876–1952), Dutch general
- Hermann Winkelmann (1849–1912), German heldentenor
- Jane Winkelman (1949–2012), American painter
- Johann Just Winkelmann (1620–1699)
- Joshua Winkelman (born 1970), better known as Josh Wink, American electronic musician
- Kira Weidle-Winkelmann (born 1996), German alpine skier
- Maria Margarethe Winckelmann (1670–1720), German astronomer known as Maria Margarethe Kirch (née Winckelmann)
- Pete Winkelman, British football executive
- Stephan Winkelmann (born 1964), CEO of Lamborghini
- Willem Winkelman (1887–1990), Dutch athlete
- A fictional child character in the 1971 film: Willy Wonka and the Chocolate Factory

== See also ==
- Winkleman
- Winckelmann (disambiguation)
