= August Weger =

German graphic artist, steel engraver and printer

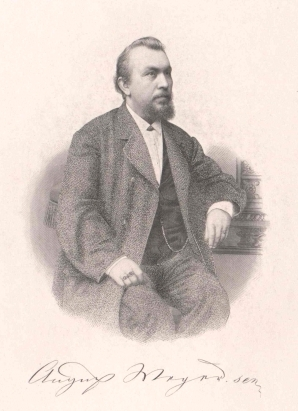
August Weger, self-Portrait

August Weger (28 July 1823 – 27 May 1892) was a German graphic artist, steel engraver and printer.

Born in Nuremberg, Weger founded a graphic institute in Leipzig in 1840. Weger is still known today for his portraits of famous people such as Matthias Claudius, Friedrich Gerstäcker, Emil Scaria, Robert Schumann, Emil Devrient, Robert Blum and Ludwig Feuerbach.

Weger died in Leipzig at age 68.
