= Néron (opera) =

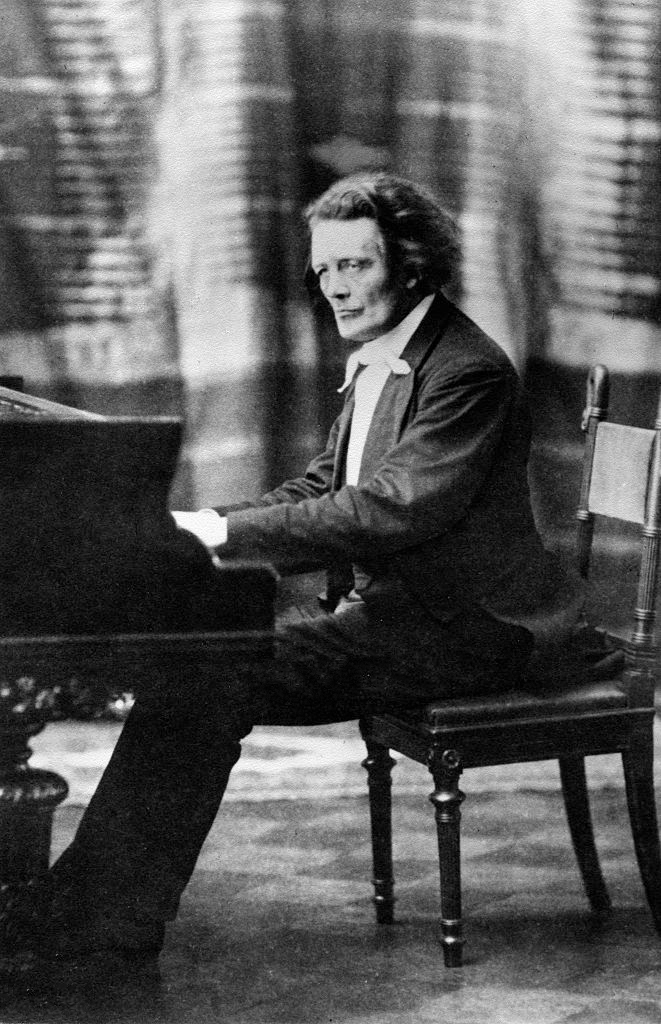
Rubinstein at the piano

Néron (Nero) is a grand opera in four acts by Anton Rubinstein to a libretto by Jules Barbier, loosely based on the story of the Roman Emperor Nero.

== Background ==
Néron has a complex history. It was originally commissioned from the composer by the director of the Paris Opéra, Émile Perrin, in the 1860s. However the opera was never to be performed there. Rubinstein only got around to composing the score in 1875/6. The opera's premiere, in a German translation, was at the Stadttheater am Dammtor in Hamburg on 1 October 1879. The title role was sung by the Heldentenor Hermann Winkelmann, who later achieved prominence as the creator of the title role in Wagner's Parsifal.

Its premiere in Russia, on 10 February [O.S. 29 January] 1884 at the Mariinsky Theatre, was in Italian. The first performance of the opera in its original French libretto was at Rouen on 14 February 1894.

== Roles ==
Role	Voice type	Premiere Cast 1 November 1879 Hamburg
The Emperor Nero	tenor	Hermann Winkelmann
Julius Vindex Prince of Aquitaine	baritone	Franz Krückl
Babilus of Ephesus, a seer.	bass	
Poppea Sabina, Nero's mistress	soprano	Prochaska
Agrippina, Nero's mother	contralto	
Epicharis, a courtesan	contralto	Borrée
Chrysa, her daughter	soprano	Rosa Sucher
Saccus, a poet	tenor	Leopold Landau
Tigellinus, prefect of the Praetorian Guard	baritone	
Chorus: citizens, dancers, Christians, priests, slaves etc.

== Synopsis ==
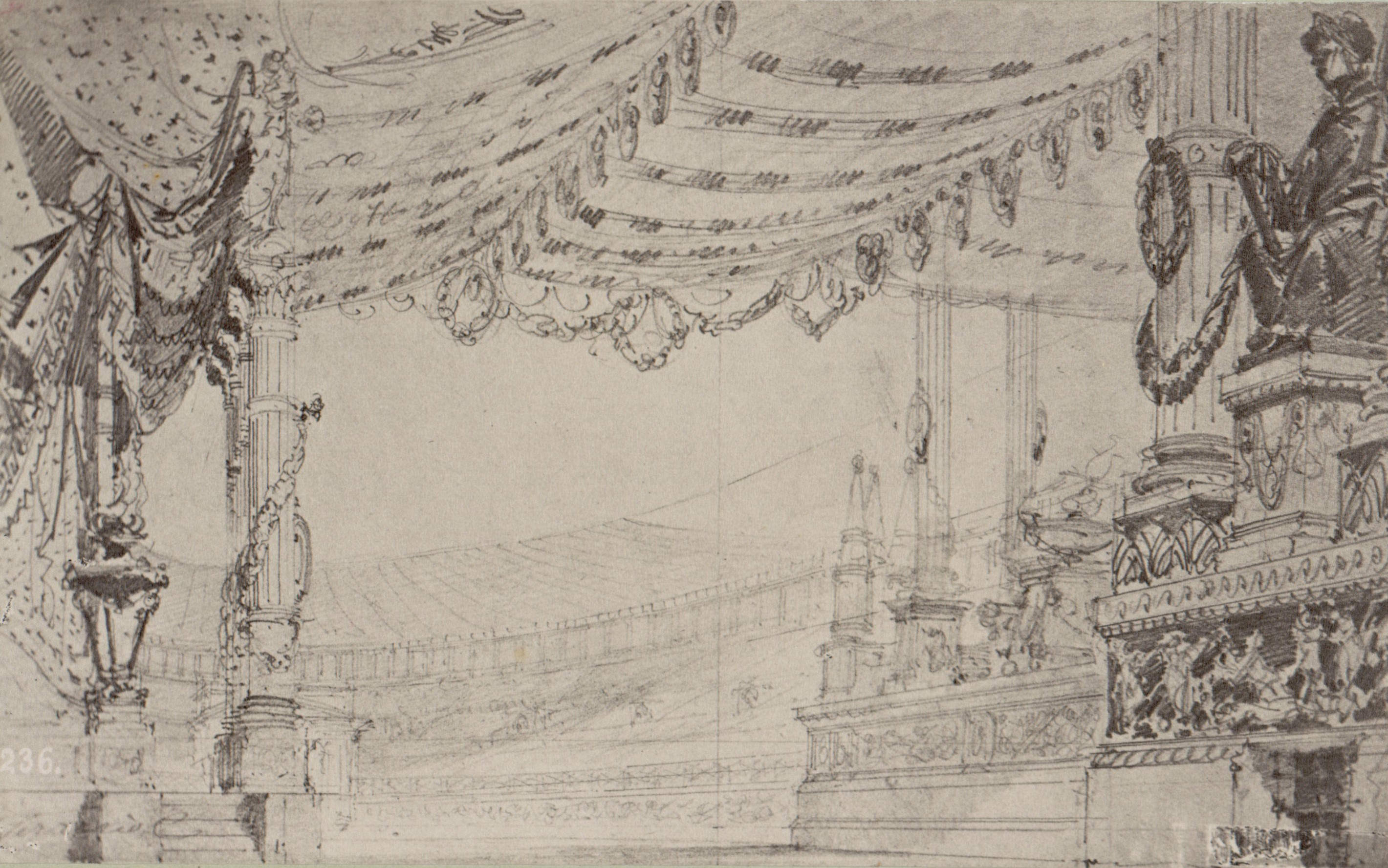
Circo di Corinto, set design for Nerone act 1 scene 1 (1877).

Rome, about 60 AD.

=== Act I ===
The house of the courtesan Epicharis, where a party is taking place. Enter Chrysa, who begs Vindex to give her protection from a pursuing band of low-life, who invade the premises. Their leader turns out to be Nero in disguise. Saccus suggests that, by way of entertainment, a mock-marriage be arranged between Nero and Chrysa - she is forced to consent, but Epicharis rescues her by giving her a drug which makes her appear dead.

=== Act II ===
Poppea's rooms in the Imperial Palace. Poppea looks forward to ascending the throne as Nero's wife. In the meantime Agrippina has kidnapped Chrysa to win favour with her son by presenting her to him. Enter Epicharis to ask Nero's help in finding her daughter - only to discover that he had believed Chrysa dead. Whilst he is ecstatic with the news that she lives, the jealous Poppea hands Chrysa over to Vindex to keep her out of the way. Nero meanwhile declares himself to be a God.

=== Act III ===
A cottage owned by Epicharis. Vindex, guarding Chrysa, makes her a marriage proposal. Nero has however tracked down their refuge and also offers to marry her - which Chrysa declines. Enter Poppea to tell Nero that Rome is burning - which he already knows, as he began the conflagration. He praises the flames and curses the Christians. Chrysa reveals that she is a Christian herself. The house collapses, burying Chrysa and Epicharis.

=== Act IV ===
The Mausoleum of Augustus. Nero, in hiding, is haunted by the spectres of his victims. Realizing that Vindex has tracked him down, he commits suicide with the assistance of Saccus. A shining Cross appears in the sky.

== Tchaikovsky's opinion ==
After playing through the score, Pyotr Ilyich Tchaikovsky wrote in his diary:

[...] It infuriates me [...] The reason I play this loathsome thing is the consciousness of my own superiority - and that keeps up my strength. You think you are writing abominably, but then you look at this drivel which people have performed in all seriousness, and your soul feels lighter.

== Mooted revival ==
The contemporary tenor Roberto Alagna is reported as interested in playing the title role in a possible revival.

== Sources ==
- Richard Taruskin, Néron, Grove Music Online, accessed 19 April 2010
- Philip S. Taylor, Anton Rubinstein: A Life in Music, Indianapolis, 2007
