= Wagner Dream =

2007 opera by Jonathan Harvey

Wagner Dream is an opera by Jonathan Harvey, premiered in 2007, to a libretto by Jean-Claude Carrière, which intertwines events on the last day of the life of Richard Wagner with elements from a fragmentary opera sketch by Wagner himself, Die Sieger (The Victors).

== Background ==
Die Sieger was drafted between 1856 and 1858, at a period when Wagner had become greatly interested in Buddhism. It is based on legends which Wagner discovered in Eugène Burnouf's 1844 Introduction to the History of Buddhism. Wagner planned a production of this work for 1870 in his programme for King Ludwig II of Bavaria but never progressed it – (however, elements of the story persist in his opera Parsifal).

Harvey described some of the processes he used in creating Wagner Dream. These include the use of a French horn and a sampled trombone playing deep notes at the opera's commencement, representing boat sirens on the Grand Canal in Venice. The composer also visited Chamonix to sample a thunderclap, used to preface an argument between Wagner and his wife.

== Narrative structure and scoring ==
The story tells of the love of the outcast chandala Prakriti for the monk Ānanda. Although both are ostracized by the other monks, Buddha permits their chaste union and allows Prakriti to join the monastic community. Wagner Dream intersperses the Prakriti/Ānanda story with the events surrounding Wagner's death in Venice. As Wagner dies from a heart attack, he recalls the opera he never completed. Whilst the "Indian" roles are all sung, the members of the Wagner household, including his wife Cosima and the soprano Carrie Pringle (with whom it has been alleged that Wagner had his last love affair) are spoken roles. The score uses electronic music as well as an ensemble of 24 musicians.

== Premiere and performance history ==
The opera was premiered at the Grand Théâtre de Luxembourg in April 2007, prior to a run at the Westergasfabriek, Amsterdam, in a production by Pierre Audi for De Nederlandse Opera, which commissioned the work. Its British premiere took place at the Barbican Centre as a [concert performance]] in London on 29 January 2012. The first British staged performance was given on 6 June 2013 in the Wales Millennium Centre Cardiff by Welsh National Opera (WNO), directed by Pierre Audi. In this production, German was used for the spoken text while the Buddhist characters sang in Pali. In a programme note, WNO's artistic director, David Pountney, stated that this change was discussed with Jonathan Harvey with the aim of "seeking to enhance and clarify the cultural dialogue which is the centrepiece of (Harvey's) opera".

== Roles ==
Roles, voice types, premiere casts
Role	Voice type	Premiere cast, 28 April 2007, Grand Théâtre, Luxembourg Conductor: Martyn Brabbins	British premiere, 29 January 2012 Conductor: Martyn Brabbins	British stage premiere, 6 June 2013 Conductor: Nicholas Collon
Vairochana	bass	Matthew Best	Simon Bailey	Richard Wiegold
Prakriti	soprano	Claire Booth	Claire Booth	Claire Booth
Old Brahmin	bass	Richard Angas	Richard Angas	Richard Angas
Ānanda	tenor	Gordon Gietz	Andrew Staples	Robin Tritschler
Buddha	baritone	Dale Duesing	Roderick Williams	David Stout
Prakriti's mother	mezzo-soprano	Rebecca de Pont Davies	Hilary Summers	Rebecca De Pont Davies
Richard Wagner	spoken	Johan Leysen	Nicholas Le Prevost	Gerhard Brössner
Cosima Wagner	spoken	Catherine ten Bruggencate	Ruth Lass	Karin Giegerich
Carrie Pringle	spoken		Julia Innocenti	Ulrike Sophie Rindermann
Doctor Keppler	spoken		Richard Jackson	Chris Rogers
Betty	spoken		Sally Brooks	Jane Oakland
Chorus
