= Carrie Pringle =

Anglo-Austrian singer and opera singer

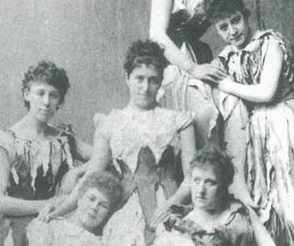
Flowermaidens at the 1882 premiere of Wagner's Parsifal. At left is Carrie Pringle

Carrie Pringle (Caroline Mary Isabelle Pringle; 19 March 1859 – 12 November 1930) was an Austrian-born British soprano singer. She performed the role of one of the Flowermaidens in the 1882 premiere of Richard Wagner's Parsifal at the Bayreuth Festival. Unproven rumours associate Wagner's supposed infatuation with Pringle with the circumstances of his death in Venice in 1883.

== Life ==
Carrie Pringle was born in Linz, the daughter of Basil Pringle, a landowner and amateur violinist, and Isabella, née Latinovics de Borsód, whose family originated from Hódság (then in the Austrian Empire, present-day Serbia), and who was a talented pianist. During her youth the family lived in Germany and Italy. The conductor Hermann Levi had heard Pringle sing in 1878; it seems to have been on his suggestion that Wagner auditioned Pringle in 1881 for the role of a Flowermaiden; in Act II of Parsifal these characters have an important scene in which they attempt to seduce the eponymous hero, on the commands of the magician Klingsor. Although Levi, who was to conduct the work's premiere, was uncertain about her, she was engaged.

Pringle was the only one of the original Flowermaidens not to be re-engaged for the 1883 production of Parsifal, and moved with her parents and siblings to London. In England her career was fitful and she apparently never appeared on the opera stage again. Other members of the family also sought musical professions, including her brother Godfrey Pringle (1867–1900) who wrote two operas. Pringle and her mother both gave music lessons, and she herself sought by advertisement, engagements for theatres and seaside piers during the holiday seasons. Pringle never married; she died in Brighton in 1930 of ovarian cancer.

== Pringle and Wagner ==
Advertisement by Carrie Pringle in The Musical Times of 1 November 1895, containing testimonial of Frederick Bridge.

Although Pringle's audition with Wagner in 1881 was indifferent, she performed well in the first production of Parsifal. Wagner was particularly keen on the 'Flower Scene' in the opera, and at this point shouted "Bravo!" at many of the sixteen performances in the Bayreuth Festival Theatre, much to the disgust of the audience (which presumably did not realize who was enthusing). Wagner also enjoyed the company of the Flowermaidens offstage: Cosima Wagner recorded in her diary for 3 August 1882 "[Richard] sits by the stove...amidst the Flowermaidens and talks jokingly with them". In Wagner's own essay on the Parsifal production (1 November 1882), he gushed: "I do not believe that the enchantment of girlish grace expressed in singing and acting has ever been conveyed...in a manner which can stand comparison to that of the young ladies, true artists, who performed this scene in Parsifal." However, in the event, in the opinion of those around Wagner, Pringle proved too undisciplined and was 'overparted'.

== Wagner's death ==
Wagner died at the Palazzo Vendramin Calergi in Venice of a heart attack on 13 February 1883. There is some evidence that earlier in the day, there had been some argument between him and Cosima, on the subject of which there is no record. The memoirs of the criminologist Alexandre Lacassagne, published forty years after Wagner's death, include the first suggestion that this argument was associated with Pringle: "In February 1883...[Wagner] gave out his intention of engaging Miss Pringle, but met with serious opposition all round. He flew into a violent temper and had a sudden apoplectic seizure to which he succumbed in half-an-hour". Other writers embroidered this tale, to claim that Pringle had been Wagner's lover since 1882. A further elaboration has been that Pringle intended to visit Wagner in Venice, prompting Cosima's displeasure. The Wagner scholar Stewart Spencer has demonstrated the complete absence of any first-hand or documentary evidence to support such stories. The only material connecting Pringle to Wagner's death is a telegram of condolences sent by the Pringle family from Milan after the event.

Nevertheless, in the words of David Cormack, "The 'English Flowermaiden killed Wagner' story refuses to give up the ghost." In Jonathan Harvey's 2007 opera about Wagner's last day, Wagner Dream, which assumes that Wagner and Pringle had an affair, Carrie Pringle appears onstage in a spoken role.

== Sources ==
- Baker, John A. (2008). Wagner and Venice. Rochester: University of Rochester Press. ISBN 9781580462884.
- Cormack, David (2005). Wir welken und sterben dahinnen: Carrie Pringle and the Solo Flowermaidens of 1882",(subscription required) in Musical Times, vol. 146 no. 1890 (Spring 2005), pp. 16–31. Accessed 28 March 2015.
- Cormack, David (2009). "English Flowermaidens (And Other Transplants) at Bayreuth"(subscription required) in Musical Times, vol. 150 no. 1909 (Winter 2009), pp. 95–102. Accessed 28 March 2015.
- Gadd, Stephen (2011). "Carrie Pringle – Some Answers", in Gadabout blog, accessed 28 March 2015.
- Newman, Ernest (1976). The Life of Richard Wagner, 4 vols. Cambridge: Cambridge University Press. ISBN 978-0-685-14824-2.
- Spencer, Stewart (2004). " "Er starb, – ein Mensch wie alle": Wagner and Carrie Pringle", in Wagner vol. 25 no. 2.
- Vaszonyi, Nicolas (ed.) (2013). "Pringle, Carrie", in The Cambridge Wagner Encyclopaedia, Cambridge: Cambridge University Press. ISBN 978-1-107-00425-2
- von Westernhagen, Curt (1979). "Wagner's Last Day"(subscription required) in Musical Times, vol. 120 no. 1635 (May 1979), pp. 395–397. Accessed 28 March 2015.
