= Die Sieger =

Draft sketch for an opera by Richard Wagner

- Draft for an opera libretto by Richard Wagner
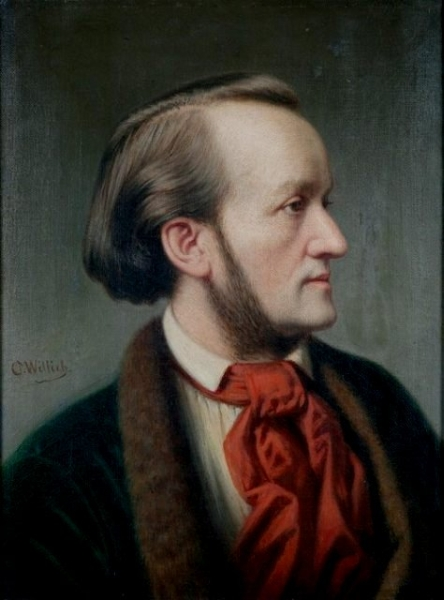
- Portrait of Wagner who wrote the text 1856 to 1858, c. 1862
- Language: German
- Based on: Legends of Prakriti and Ānanda

Die Sieger (The Victors; WWV 89), is a draft sketch for an opera text by Richard Wagner.

Die Sieger was drafted between 1856 and 1858, at a period when Wagner had become greatly interested in Buddhism. The fragmentary prose sketch which survives shows that it was based on legends which Wagner discovered in Eugène Burnouf's 1844 Introduction to the History of Buddhism. The story tells of the love of the outcast chandala Prakriti for the monk Ānanda. Although both are ostracised by the other monks, Buddha permits their chaste union, and allows Prakriti to join the monastic community.

Writing to Marie Sayn-Wittgenstein in 1857, Wagner refers to the girl as 'Savitri' and suggests a three-act structure. He further wrote about the project to Mathilde Wesendonck from Venice in 1858, comparing himself and Mathilde to Ananda and Savitri.

No musical sketches for this work are known to have been undertaken. Although Wagner planned a production of Die Sieger for 1870 in his 1865 programme of proposals for King Ludwig II of Bavaria, he never took it further. However, elements of the story persist in his opera Parsifal.

Elements of Die Sieger were used by the British composer Jonathan Harvey in his own opera, Wagner Dream (2007).
