= Richard Angas =

British bass singer (1942–2013)

Richard George Angas (18 April 1942 – 20 August 2013) was a British bass singer, particularly associated with the English National Opera, but who also sang with other UK opera companies and in Europe.

== Life and career ==
The Angas family were keen amateur musicians, and Richard, who was born in Esher in Greater London, became a chorister at the Royal School of Church Music as well as joining a local choral group. From 1960 until 1964 he studied at the Royal Academy of Music in London, and in 1965 won both the Kathleen Ferrier Memorial Scholarship and the Richard Tauber Memorial Prize, before continuing his studies in 1965 and 1966 with Ilse Rapf and Erik Werba at the Vienna State Academy, and finally with Josephine Veasey.

Angas's debut was as Lodovico in Otello for Scottish Opera in 1966. He sang the Abbot in Britten's Curlew River for English Opera Group in 1969. He first appeared with Welsh National Opera in 1976, and in 1980 began a 30-year association with English National Opera (ENO) where his roles included Pluto (L'Orfeo), Basilio (The Barber of Seville), Gloucester (Lear), Arkel (Pelléas et Mélisande (opera)), various roles in War and Peace, and the Mikado, which he sang over 150 times. He sang at the Metropolitan Opera House in New York City with ENO on tour in 1984.

He created roles in The Catiline Conspiracy (Hamilton, 1974), We Come to the River (Henze, 1975), The Magic Fountain (Delius, 1977 premiere of 1895 opera), The Mask of Orpheus (Birtwistle, 1986), Master and Margarita (Höller, 1989), Wagner Dream (Harvey, 2013), The Merchant of Venice (Tchaikowsky, 2013).

Angas was particularly admired by director David Pountney, with whom he worked on notable productions such as Lulu, Wagner Dream and The Merchant of Venice (Tchaikowsky at the Bregenz Festival 2013).

He sang Temrouk in the 1975 BBC broadcast of Ivan IV, and several roles in a rare 1983 transmission of Brian's The Tigers. Commercial records include a priest in Schoenberg's Moses und Aron conducted by Boulez in 1974, Simon Magus and Envy in The Pilgrim's Progress in 1971 under Boult, and the Cuisinière in The Love for Three Oranges under Denève in 2005. He sang the Norman Allin line as part of the 1969 Boult recording of Serenade to Music. ENO recordings of The Mikado (title role), Orpheus in the Underworld (Jupiter) and Pacific Overtures (reciter) are also available.

He appeared on television as Sir Richard Cholmondely in The Yeomen of the Guard in 1975 and in a documentary on Venetian operas introduced by Raymond Leppard in 1973.

The magazine Opera commented that "his gravelly yet vivid bass, great verbal acuity and 6'7" frame all contributed to an instantly recognizable stage presence", while The Guardian noted his "vocal presence ... immaculate diction and focused acting skills".

Angas died in Leeds, where a concert celebrating his life and career was held at the Grand Theatre on 16 February 2014; it attracted thirty major singers and five conductors from several UK opera companies. Lesley Garrett, Susan Bullock and Jean Rigby sang the "Three Little Maids" from The Mikado, songs by Ireland and Schubert and Vaughan Williams' Serenade to Music were performed, and there were readings by colleagues.
