= Hermann Winkelmann =

German opera singer

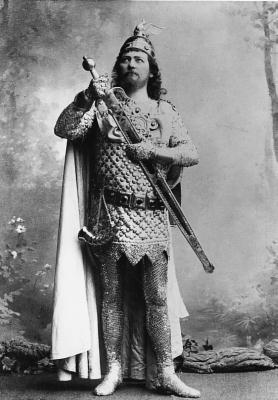
Hermann Winkelmann

Hermann Winkelmann (or Winckelmann) (8 March 1849 – 18 January 1912) was a German Heldentenor, notable for creating the title role in Richard Wagner's Parsifal in 1882.

== Biography ==
Hermann Winkelmann was born in Braunschweig in 1849. His father, Christian Ludewig Theodor Winkelmann, was the founder of Zeitter & Winkelmann, piano manufacturers, and he himself planned to continue his father's trade. He went to Paris to study piano construction, but while there he decided to become a singer. He had his initial training in Paris, and later with Koch in Hanover.

Winkelmann made his debut as Manrico in Verdi's Il trovatore in the Court Theatre of Sondershausen in 1875. He then sang in such places as Altenburg, Darmstadt, and Leipzig. He joined the Hamburg State Opera in 1878.

The first role he created was that of Anton Rubinstein's Néron, in a German translation at the Theater am Dammtor in Hamburg on 1 October 1879 (it did not have its Russian premiere until 1884).

Winkelmann became a Heldentenor specialising in the music dramas of Richard Wagner, and was known for the title roles of Tannhäuser and Lohengrin, and as Walther von Stolzing in Die Meistersinger von Nürnberg.

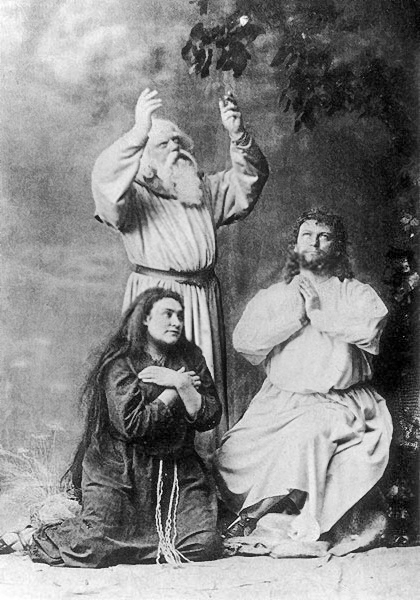
Hermann Winkelmann in the inaugural production of Parsifal

Wagner himself chose Winkelmann to create the title role of Parsifal at the Bayreuth Festspielhaus in 1882, and he sang it there until 1891, usually alongside Amalie Materna, the creator of the role of Kundry.

He was seen at the Theatre Royal, Drury Lane, during the Hamburg Opera's London visit in 1882, under Hans Richter. He created Tristan in London; in fact, he and Richter required so many rehearsals of Tristan und Isolde that this caused the postponement of the premiere of Hubert Parry's latest symphony. He was also the first Walther to be heard in London. He also sang Lohengrin and Tannhäuser there, and participated in a then-rare performance of Beethoven's Choral Symphony, also under Richter.

In 1883 Winkelmann became a member of the Vienna Court Opera, where he was celebrated mainly for his Wagner performances. He was the first Tristan in Vienna (1883), and also the first Otello in that city, where he remained until 1906.

In 1884 he appeared in the United States at Wagner festivals in New York, Chicago, Boston and Cincinnati, some under the baton of Theodore Thomas. He toured with Emil Scaria and Amalie Materna, with whom he had performed at the Vienna State Opera.

He later sang in concert, oratorio and lieder. He retired from the stage in 1907, and died at Mauer, Vienna, in 1912, aged 62.

Recordings exist of his voice in his later career, and he appears in The Record of Singing.

His son Hans Winckelmann was also an opera singer.
