= Rudolf Krasselt =

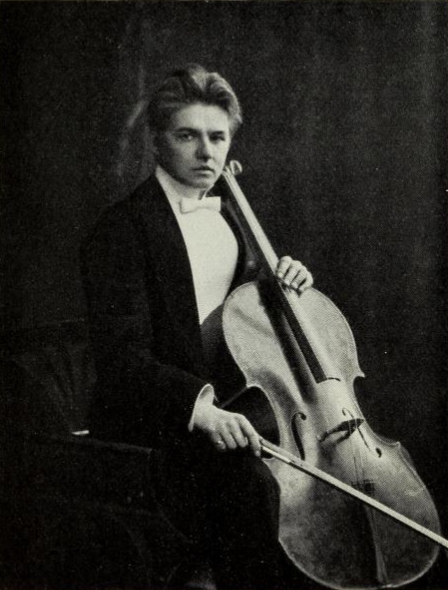
Rudolf Krasselt (c. 1903)

Rudolf Krasselt (1 January 1879 – 12 April 1954) was a German violoncellist, conductor and director of the Staatsoper Hannover during the Weimar Republic and the period of National Socialism.

== Life ==
Born in Baden-Baden, Krasselt grew up as son of the concertmaster of the Baden-Baden Symphony Orchestra Johann Gustav Krasselt. His brother was the violin virtuoso, concert master and conductor Alfred Krasselt (1872-1908). Rudolf Krasselt played the violoncello since he was 9 years old. He was principal cellist of the Vienna Court Opera Orchestra (and the Vienna Philharmonic) under Gustav Mahler, principal cellist of the Berlin Philharmonic under Arthur Nikisch and from 1903 to 1904 principal cellist of the Boston Symphony Orchestra.

From 1911 to 1913 he was 1st Kapellmeister of the opera house in Kiel and in 1913 he took over the direction of the Deutsches Opernhaus in Berlin-Charlottenburg as 1st Kapellmeister. There he also led a Kapellmeister class as professor at the State Academy of Music.

On 1 April 1924 he became general music director at the Staatsoper Hannover and at the beginning of the new season 1924/1925 opera director and in 1934 opera director. At the instigation of the Nazi regime he went into (early) retirement on 11 July 1943. In the final phase of the Second World War, Hitler accepted him into the Gottbegnadeten list of the most important conductors in August 1944, which saved Krasselt from a war mission, also on the Heimatfront.

== Work ==
Coming from orchestral practice, Krasselt combined conducting brilliance with accuracy, a sense of responsibility and authority in the best sense; things he also passed on to his students. Among others, Kurt Weill, Ernst Krenek, Berthold Goldschmidt, Günter Raphael, Johannes Schüler, Rudolf Wagner-Régeny and Mark Lothar learned conducting with him at the Berlin Musikhochschule.

In Hannover he built up a management team together with the head conductor Hans Winckelmann, the chief stage designer Kurt Söhnlein, the concert master Max Ladscheck, who had followed him from Berlin, and the two Kapellmeisters Arno Grau and Johannes Schüler in such a way that the Städtische Oper Hannover was among the five best opera houses in Germany within a few years.

The emerging modern dance was represented by the ballet greats Yvonne Georgi and Harald Kreutzberg, who Krasselt skilfully managed to tie to the house. He was joined by a world-renowned singing ensemble, in which Tiana Lemnitz, Emmy Sack, Carl Hauss, Peter Anders, Josef Correck, Willy Schöneweiss, Wilhelm Patsche and Otto Köhler sang, among others.

Always intent on constantly expanding his repertoire, Krasselt brought all the essential elements to the repertoire, whereby the systematic cultivation of Ermanno Wolf-Ferrari's complete works brought the Hanover Opera House success.

When a smear campaign was launched against the concertmaster Max Ladscheck (1889-1970) for alleged anti-National Socialist statements, Krasselt vehemently stood up for him and made himself unpopular with the National Socialists forever. Although he was held in high esteem both at home and abroad, he was sent into retirement in July 1943, although shortly before that he had held the first German-French co-production at the Opéra Garnier of Wagner's The Ring of the Nibelung. After Krasselt had said goodbye to Wagner's Die Walküre in Hanover - showered with ovations lasting for hours - the "fire magic" became a symbol: only a few days later the Hanover Opera House sank into rubble and ashes in a bombing raid. Krasselt's successors in office, the convinced National Socialist Gustav Rudolf Sellner and his general music director Mathieu Lange, stood before the smoking ruins of the once so proud opera house with its much praised acoustics when he took office.

Shortly after the end of the Second World War, Sellner and Lange voluntarily resigned from their contracts. Krasselt was immediately rehabilitated and was available to the Hanover Opera House as a guest until 1951. He died in Andernach aged 75.

== Literature ==
- Hannoversche Zeitung. 12 July 1943, p. 4
- Das Niedersächsische Staatsorchester Hannover 1636–1986. Schlütersche Verlagsbuchhandlung, 1986, ISBN 3-87706-041-2.
- Le philarmonique de Vienne
- Heiko Bockstiegel: Meine Herren, kennen Sie das Stück? Erinnerungen an deutschsprachige Dirigenten des 20. Jahrhunderts und ihr Wirken im Opern- und Konzertleben Deutschlands. Wolfratshausen, Grimm 1996, ISBN 3-9802695-2-3, pp. 133–136.
- Claus Harms: Maßstäbe für Hannovers Oper. HAZ vom 30./31. December 1979
- Klaus Mlynek, Waldemar R. Röhrbein, Dieter Brosius: Geschichte der Stadt Hannover. Vol 2. Schlütersche Verlagsbuchhandlung, Hannover 1994, ISBN 3-87706-364-0 ( at Google Books).
