= Orchidée =

Orchidée is software developed by IRCAM as a computer-aided orchestration tool.

It is a MATLAB-based application that communicates with traditional computer-aided composition environments through Open Sound Control messages. This means that it can be effectively controlled from programs like Max/MSP or OpenMusic. It was developed by Grégoire Carpentier and Damien Tardieu during their PhD studies at IRCAM, with the help and supervision of composer Yan Maresz.

A recent example of its use for orchestral composition were in Jonathan Harvey's Speakings, premiered in 2008, in which speech was analyzed and computed to provide orchestral combinations for the composer. Given an input target sound, Orchidée creates a musical score which imitates the sound using a mixture of traditional instruments. It then searches within a large instrument sample database for combinations of sounds that perceptually match the target. The application takes into account complex combinatorial possibilities, considering virtually infinite sets of different sounds created by the orchestra. It also considers musical attributes such as instruments and dynamics, and perceptual attributes as brightness and roughness. For example, in Speakings, a mantra ("Oh/Ah/Hum") was analyzed and imputed into Orchidée, which in turn generated different possibilities for orchestration. This mantra was then developed throughout the piece using such possibilities.

Other musical works using Orchidée:

- Daniel Fígols Cuevas, Kaala, 2012, CNSMDP, Paris
- Marc Garcia Vitoria, Mimesis, 2011, Paris
- Alec Hall, Striped Noise, New York, 2011
- Javier Torres Maldonado, Un posible dia, Paris, 2011
- Marc Garcia Vitoria, The P Extensions, 2010, Geneva
- Christopher Trapani, Cognitive Consonance, Le 104, 2010, Paris
- Christopher Trapani, Westering, Carnegie Hall, New York, 2010
- Marco Suarez Cifuentes, Poetry for //dark-/ dolls, 2009, IRCAM, Paris
- Fernando Villanueva Carretero, Bukowski Madrigals, 2009, IRCAM, Paris
- Kenji Sakai, Astral/Chromoprojection, 2009, IRCAM, Paris
- Gérard Buquet, L'Astre échevelée, 2009, IRCAM, Paris
- Miguel Farías, Mambo Lines, 2011, Geneva

== See also ==
- List of music software
