= Christian Ludewig Theodor Winkelmann =

German piano maker (1812–1875)

Christian Ludewig Theodor Winkelmann, also spelled Winckelmann (3 November 1812 – 7 February 1875) was a German piano maker.

== Life ==
Born in Braunschweig, Winkelmann was the son of a master carpenter. He first worked with luthier Carl Rautmann in Wolfenbüttel and in 1837 he founded a piano factory in Brunswick. The first 3 uprights were made at home. Then grand pianos were made. In 1851, through the pianist Henry Litolff, an association was formed with the piano manufacturer Friedrich Zeitter from Vienna who introduced some innovations such as iron frames. This increased production from 60 to 80 instruments per year. The company named Zeitter & Winkelmann was one of the largest piano manufacturers in northern Germany.

In 1860, Winkelmann was appointed a supplier of pianos for the ducal court.

Winkelmann's grandson was the tenor Hermann Winkelmann and his great grandson the tenor Hans Winckelmann.

== Bibliography ==
- Horst-Rüdiger Jarck, Günter Scheel (editors): Braunschweigisches Biographisches Lexikon – 19. und 20. Jahrhundert. Hahnsche Buchhandlung, Hannover 1996, ISBN 3-7752-5838-8.
