= Hans Winckelmann =

German opera singer

Johannes Gustav "Hans" Winckelmann (14 September 1881 – 9 October 1943) was a German operatic tenor and opera director.

== Life ==
Hans Winckelmann was born in Hamburg to father Wagner singer Hermann Winkelmann, grandson of Christian Ludewig Theodor Winkelmann, founder of the Braunschweig piano factory Zeitter & Winkelmann. Hans was trained by his father to play Wagnerian tenor and studied at the University of Vienna, where he obtained a doctorate in philosophy. He began his career as a singer at the Vienna Volksoper and then became first tenor at the Prague Opera later in Schwerin. In his Schwerin period, he made three films in Berlin in 1921 and 1922 and finally in Hanover, where he also directed about six operas a year with Rudolf Krasselt. Until his death in 1943 or only until his removal from office by the Nazis, he was head conductor at the opera house in Hannover. He also wrote a book with the title Der Opernspieler. (Leipzig: Beck 1940).

Winckelmann married twice; first in Vienna, then Prague. Winckelmann's love affair with Lala Pringsheim (Klara Koszler) allegedly produced a son, Klaus Pringsheim junior. On 8 June 1927, he married dancer Almut Upmeyer, with whom he had two children: Helga (1939–1967) and Axel Winckelmann (1942–1965). In 1943, he married his second wife Hilde, after a 17 years lasting affair. During the air raids on Hanover he sent his pregnant wife to Salzburg, where his daughter Maria was born. He himself stayed behind in Hanover and died of heart failure during the English bombing at the age of 62.

== Filmography ==
- 1921: Das Souper um Mitternacht. Abenteuer des Detektivs Harry Wills.
- 1921: Die Schatzkammer im See.
- 1921/1922: Matrosenliebste.

== Literature ==
- Klaus Pringsheim jr., Victor Boesen: Wer zum Teufel sind Sie? Ein Leben mit der Familie Mann. 2nd edition. Berlin 2002, ISBN 3-7466-1799-5, p. 267 ff.
- Die Familien Winckelmann, Pringsheim und Mann. In Die Welt
