= Winkleman =

Winkleman is a surname, a variant of German and Jewish Winkelmann, which referred to someone who either lived at a corner or owned a shop there. It may refer to the following notable people:

- Claudia Winkleman (born 1972), English television presenter, comedian, film critic, radio personality, and journalist
- George Winkleman (1859–1921), American baseball player
- Sally Soames (née Winkleman; 1937–2019), British newspaper photographer
- Sophie Winkleman (born 1980), English actress
