= George Winckelmann =

Finnish lawyer and diplomat

George Arvid Winckelmann (24 August 1884 Oulu – 15 November 1962 Helsinki) was a Finnish lawyer and a diplomat.

Winckelmann's parents were bank manager consul Henrik Winckelmann and Jenny Boström. He became a student from Oulu Lyceum in 1902 and studied at the University of Helsinki, completing a 1905 Master's degree and a 1906 jurisprudence. Winckelmann received the rank of Master Judge in 1910.

Winckelmann served as the youngest legal adviser in Helsinki in 1912-1917 and in the Ministry of Foreign Affairs as First Secretary 1918 and as Head of Division 1922-1929. He served as Chargé d'Affaires in Tokyo from 1930 to 1933 and in Madrid and Lisbon since 1933. During the Spanish Civil War (1936-1939) Winckelmann was in Lisbon. He was then an Envoy in Madrid from 1940 to 1945 and was then in non-active status in Finland since 1945. He retired in 1947. Winckelmann was also secretary of the church administration of the parish churches of Helsinki in 1914-1929 and in the church administration from 1924 to 1929. He received the 1929 Special Envoy and the Plenipotentiary's title.

Winckelmann married Gunhild Hilöa Lovisa Lagerström in 1916.
