= Emil Scaria =

Austrian bass-bariton (1838–1886)

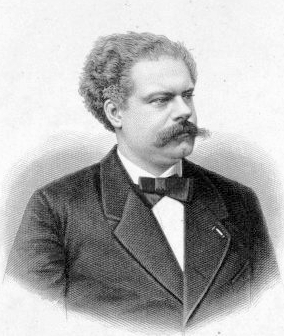
Emil Scaria

Emil Scaria (18 September 1838 – 23 July 1886) was an Austrian bass-baritone. Born in Graz, he studied at the conservatory in Vienna before making his debut in Pest in 1860; he sang the role of St. Bris in Les Huguenots. He was a failure, and abandoned the stage entirely in favor of further study; he selected Manuel García as his new teacher. Though he returned to the stage in Dessau, he did not see success until he sang at the Crystal Palace in London in 1862. In 1863, he appeared with the Leipzig Opera; in 1864, he was working in Dresden. He was engaged by the Vienna State Opera in 1872. In 1882, he created the role of Gurnemanz in Parsifal for Richard Wagner at the Bayreuth Festspielhaus. Scaria died in Blasewitz, in Germany, in 1886.

== Roles ==
=== World premieres ===
- 1868 Franz von Holstein: Der Haideschacht – Königliches Hoftheater Dresden
- 1882 Richard Wagner: Parsifal – Bayreuth Festival (Gurnemanz)

=== Repertoire ===
Auber:

- Pietro in La muette de Portici
- Grafen Juliano und Gil-Perez in Le domino noir
- Ferdinando VI of Spain in La part du diable

Beethoven:

- Rocco in Fidelio

Bizet:

- Escamillo in Carmen

Brüll:

- Bombardon in Das goldene Kreuz
- Fanfaron in Bianca

Donizetti:

- Dulcamara in L'elisir d'amore
- Alfonso in Lucrezia Borgia
- Sulpice in La fille du régiment
- Marchese von Boisfleury in Linda von Chamounix
- Dom Juan in Dom Sébastien

Gluck:

- Hercules in Alceste
- Calchas in Iphigenie in Aulis

Gounod:

- Mephisto in Faust

Halévy:

- Kardinal Brogni in Die Jüdin

Lortzing:

- Van Bett in Zar und Zimmermann
- Title role in Der Waffenschmied

Meyerbeer:

- Bertram in Robert le diable
- Marcell and Graf von Saint-Bris in Les Huguenots
- Count Obertal in Le prophète
- Gritzenko in L'étoile du nord
- High Priest of Brahma in L'Africaine

Mozart:

- Osmin in Die Entführung aus dem Serail
- Title role in Der Schauspieldirektor
- Figaro in Le nozze di Figaro
- Leporello and Komtur in Don Giovanni
- Sarastro and Sprecher in Die Zauberflöte

Nicolai:

- Falstaff in Die lustigen Weiber von Windsor

Rossini:

- Bartolo in Il barbiere di Siviglia
- Walter Furst in Guillaume Tell

Schumann:

- Siegfried in Genoveva

Thomas:

- Claudius and First gravedigger in Hamlet

Verdi:

- Ramfis in Aida

Wagner:

- Der Kardinal in Rienzi
- Title role in Der fliegende Holländer
- Landgraf in Tannhäuser
- König Heinrich in Lohengrin
- König Marke in Tristan und Isolde
- Hans Sachs and Veit Pogner in Die Meistersinger von Nürnberg
- Wotan in Das Rheingold
- Wotan in Die Walküre
- Wanderer in Siegfried
- Gurnemanz in Parsifal

Weber:

- Kaspar in Der Freischütz
- Lysiart in Euryanthe
