= Parsifal =

Music drama by Richard Wagner

- Music drama by Richard Wagner
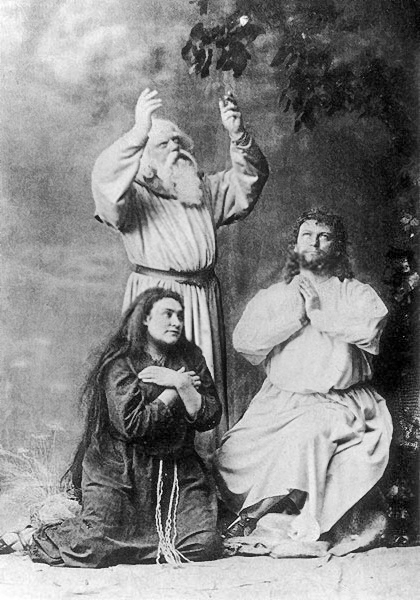
- Amalie Materna, Emil Scaria and Hermann Winkelmann in the first production of the Bühnenweihfestspiel at the Bayreuth Festival
- Librettist: Richard Wagner
- Language: German
- Based on: Parzival by Wolfram von Eschenbach
- Premiere: 26 July 1882; Bayreuth Festspielhaus

Parsifal (Note: Wagner's spelling of Parsifal instead of the Parzival he had used up to 1877 was informed by one of the theories about the name Percival, according to which it is of Persian origin, Parsi (or Parseh) Fal meaning "pure (or poor) fool".) (WWV 111) is a music drama in three acts by the German composer Richard Wagner and his last composition. Wagner's own libretto for the work is freely based on the 13th-century Middle High German chivalric romance Parzival of the Minnesänger Wolfram von Eschenbach and the Old French chivalric romance Perceval ou le Conte du Graal by the 12th-century trouvère Chrétien de Troyes, recounting different accounts of the story of the Arthurian knight Parzival (Percival) and his spiritual quest for the Holy Grail.

Wagner conceived the work in April 1857 but did not finish it until 25 years later. In composing it he took advantage of the particular acoustics of his newly built Bayreuth Festspielhaus, and Parsifal was first produced at the second Bayreuth Festival in 1882. The Bayreuth Festival maintained a monopoly on Parsifal productions until 1914; however the opera was performed at the Metropolitan Opera in New York in 1903 after a US court ruled that it was legal.

Wagner described Parsifal not as an opera, but as Ein Bühnenweihfestspiel (a sacred festival stage play). At Bayreuth a tradition has arisen that audiences do not applaud at the end of the first act. The autograph manuscript of the work is preserved in the Richard Wagner Foundation.

== Composition ==
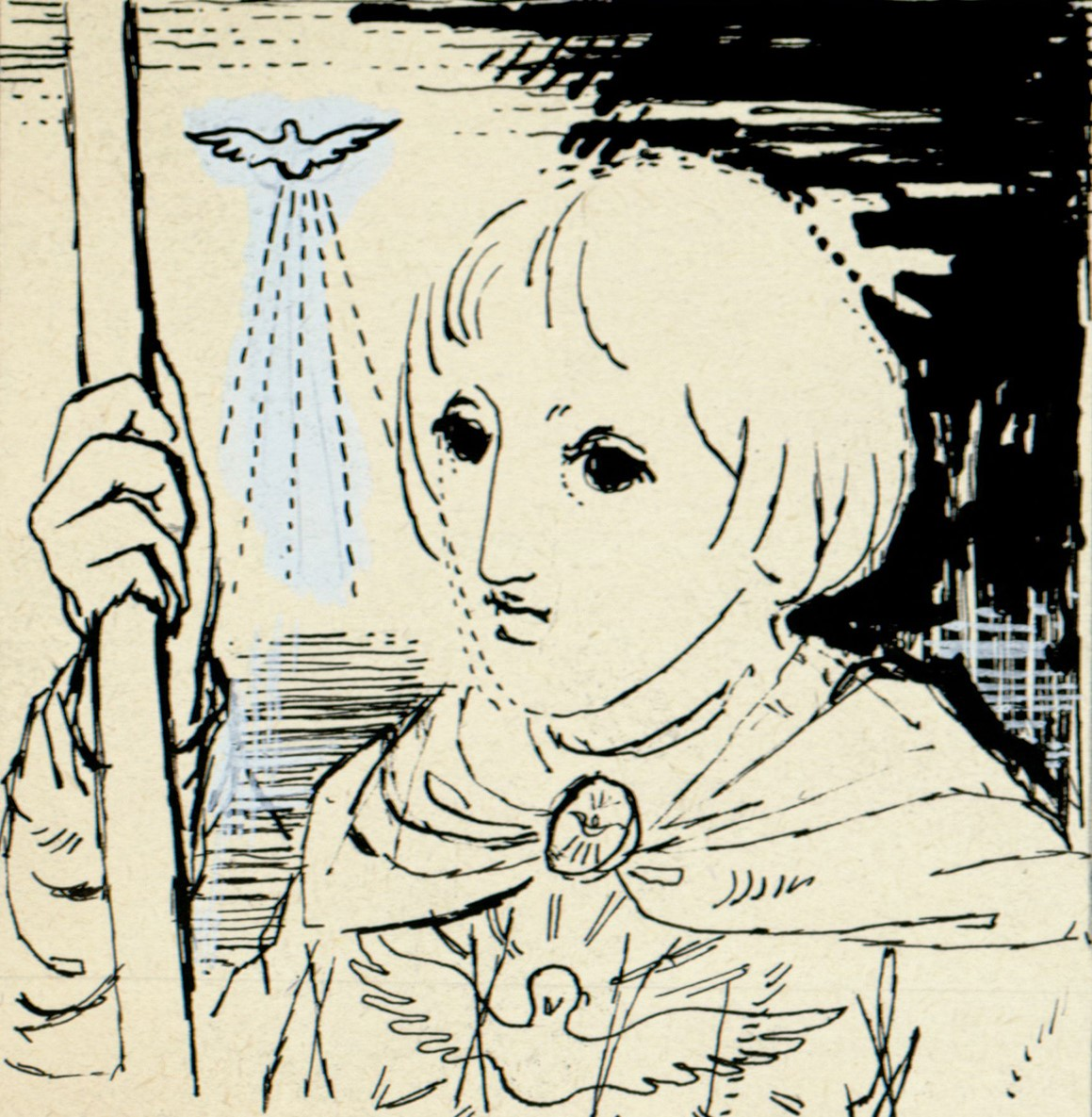
Drawing for a libretto cover page by Peter Hoffer (undated)

Wagner read von Eschenbach's poem Parzival while taking the waters at Marienbad in 1845. After encountering Arthur Schopenhauer's writings in 1854, Wagner became interested in Indian philosophies, especially Buddhism. Out of this interest came Die Sieger (The Victors, 1856), a sketch Wagner wrote for an opera based on a story from the life of Buddha. The themes of self-renunciation, rebirth, compassion, and even exclusive social groups (castes in Die Sieger, the knights of the Grail in Parsifal) which were later explored in Parsifal were first introduced in Die Sieger.

According to his autobiography Mein Leben, Wagner conceived Parsifal on Good Friday morning, April 1857, in the Asyl (German: "Asylum"), the small cottage on Otto Wesendonck's estate in the Zurich suburb of Enge, which Wesendonck – a wealthy silk merchant and generous patron of the arts – had placed at Wagner's disposal, through the good offices of his wife Mathilde Wesendonck. The composer and his wife Minna had moved into the cottage on 28 April:

... on Good Friday I awoke to find the sun shining brightly for the first time in this house: the little garden was radiant with green, the birds sang, and at last I could sit on the roof and enjoy the long-yearned-for peace with its message of promise. Full of this sentiment, I suddenly remembered that the day was Good Friday, and I called to mind the significance this omen had already once assumed for me when I was reading Wolfram's Parzival. Since the sojourn in Marienbad [in the summer of 1845], where I had conceived Die Meistersinger and Lohengrin, I had never occupied myself again with that poem; now its noble possibilities struck me with overwhelming force, and out of my thoughts about Good Friday I rapidly conceived a whole drama, of which I made a rough sketch with a few dashes of the pen, dividing the whole into three acts.

However, as his second wife Cosima Wagner later reported on 22 April 1879, this account had been colored by a certain amount of poetic licence:

R[ichard] today recalled the impression which inspired his "Good Friday Music"; he laughs, saying he had thought to himself, "In fact it is all as far-fetched as my love affairs, for it was not a Good Friday at all – just a pleasant mood in Nature which made me think, 'This is how a Good Friday ought to be'".

The work may indeed have been conceived at Wesendonck's cottage in the last week of April 1857, but Good Friday that year fell on 10 April, when the Wagners were still living at Zeltweg 13 in Zurich. If the prose sketch which Wagner mentions in Mein Leben was accurately dated (and most of Wagner's surviving papers are dated), it could settle the issue once and for all, but unfortunately it has not survived.

Wagner did not resume work on Parsifal for eight years, during which time he completed Tristan und Isolde and began Die Meistersinger von Nürnberg. Then, between 27 and 30 August 1865, he took up Parsifal again and made a prose draft of the work; this contains a fairly brief outline of the plot and a considerable amount of detailed commentary on the characters and themes of the drama. But once again the work was dropped and set aside for another eleven and a half years. During this time most of Wagner's creative energy was devoted to the Ring cycle, which was finally completed in 1874 and given its first full performance at Bayreuth in August 1876. Only when this gargantuan task had been accomplished did Wagner find the time to concentrate on Parsifal. By 23 February 1877 he had completed a second and more extensive prose draft of the work, and by 19 April of the same year he had transformed this into a verse libretto (or "poem", as Wagner liked to call his libretti).

In September 1877 he began the music by making two complete drafts of the score from beginning to end. The first of these (known in German as the Gesamtentwurf and in English as either the preliminary draft or the first complete draft) was made in pencil on three staves, one for the voices and two for the instruments. The second complete draft (Orchesterskizze, orchestral draft, short score or particell) was made in ink and on at least three, but sometimes as many as five, staves. This draft was much more detailed than the first and contained a considerable degree of instrumental elaboration.

The second draft was begun on 25 September 1877, just a few days after the first; at this point in his career Wagner liked to work on both drafts simultaneously, switching back and forth between the two to minimize the time between his initial setting of the text and the final elaboration of the music. The Gesamtentwurf of act 3 was completed on 16 April 1879 and the Orchesterskizze on the 26th of the same month.

The full score (Partiturerstschrift) was the final stage in the compositional process. It was made in ink and consisted of a fair copy of the entire opera, with all the voices and instruments properly notated according to standard practice. Wagner composed Parsifal one act at a time, completing the Gesamtentwurf and Orchesterskizze of each act before beginning the Gesamtentwurf of the next act; but because the Orchesterskizze already embodied all the compositional details of the full score, the actual drafting of the Partiturerstschrift was regarded by Wagner as little more than a routine task which could be done whenever he found the time. The prelude of act 1 was scored in August 1878. The rest of the opera was scored between August 1879 and 13 January 1882.

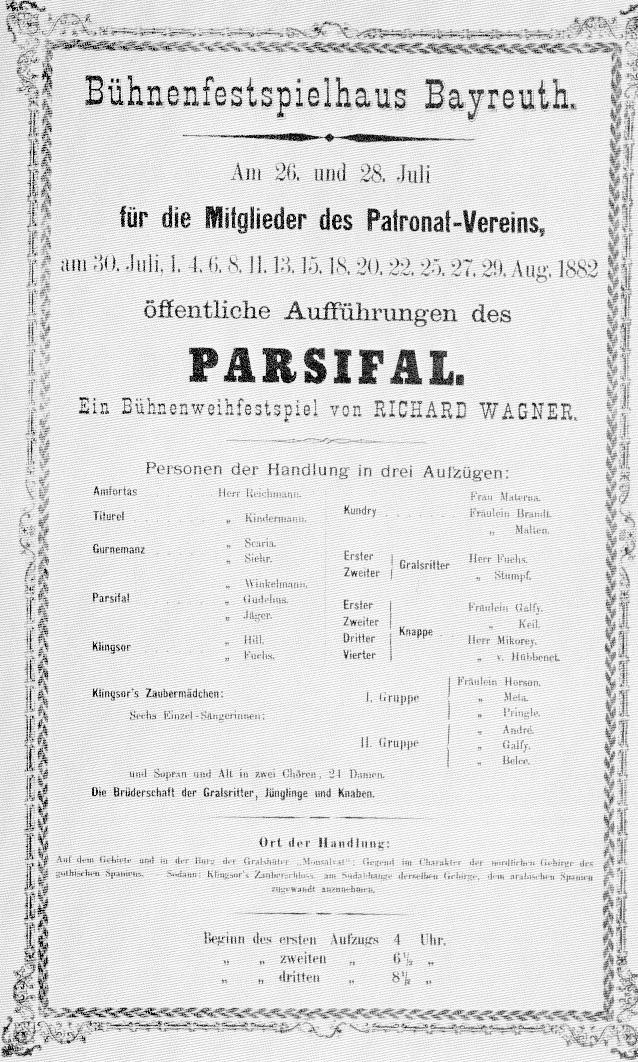
Poster for the premiere production of Parsifal, 1882

== Performance history ==
=== Premiere ===
On 12 November 1880, Wagner conducted a private performance of the prelude for his patron Ludwig II of Bavaria at the Court Theatre in Munich. The premiere of the entire work was given in the Bayreuth Festspielhaus on 26 July 1882, conducted by the Jewish-German conductor Hermann Levi. Stage designs were by Max Brückner and Paul von Joukowsky, who took their lead from Wagner himself. The Grail hall was based on the interior of Siena Cathedral which Wagner had visited in 1880, while Klingsor's magic garden was modelled on those at the Palazzo Rufolo in Ravello. In July and August 1882 sixteen performances of the work were given in Bayreuth conducted by Levi and Franz Fischer. The production boasted an orchestra of 107, a chorus of 135 and 23 soloists (with the main parts being double cast). At the last of these performances, Wagner took the baton from Levi and conducted the final scene of act 3 from the orchestral interlude to the end.

At the first performances of Parsifal, problems with the moving scenery (the Wandeldekoration) during the transition from scene 1 to scene 2 in act 1 meant that Wagner's existing orchestral interlude finished before Parsifal and Gurnemanz arrived at the hall of the Grail. Engelbert Humperdinck, who was assisting the production, provided a few extra bars of music to cover this gap. In subsequent years this problem was solved and Humperdinck's additions were not used.

=== Ban outside Bayreuth ===
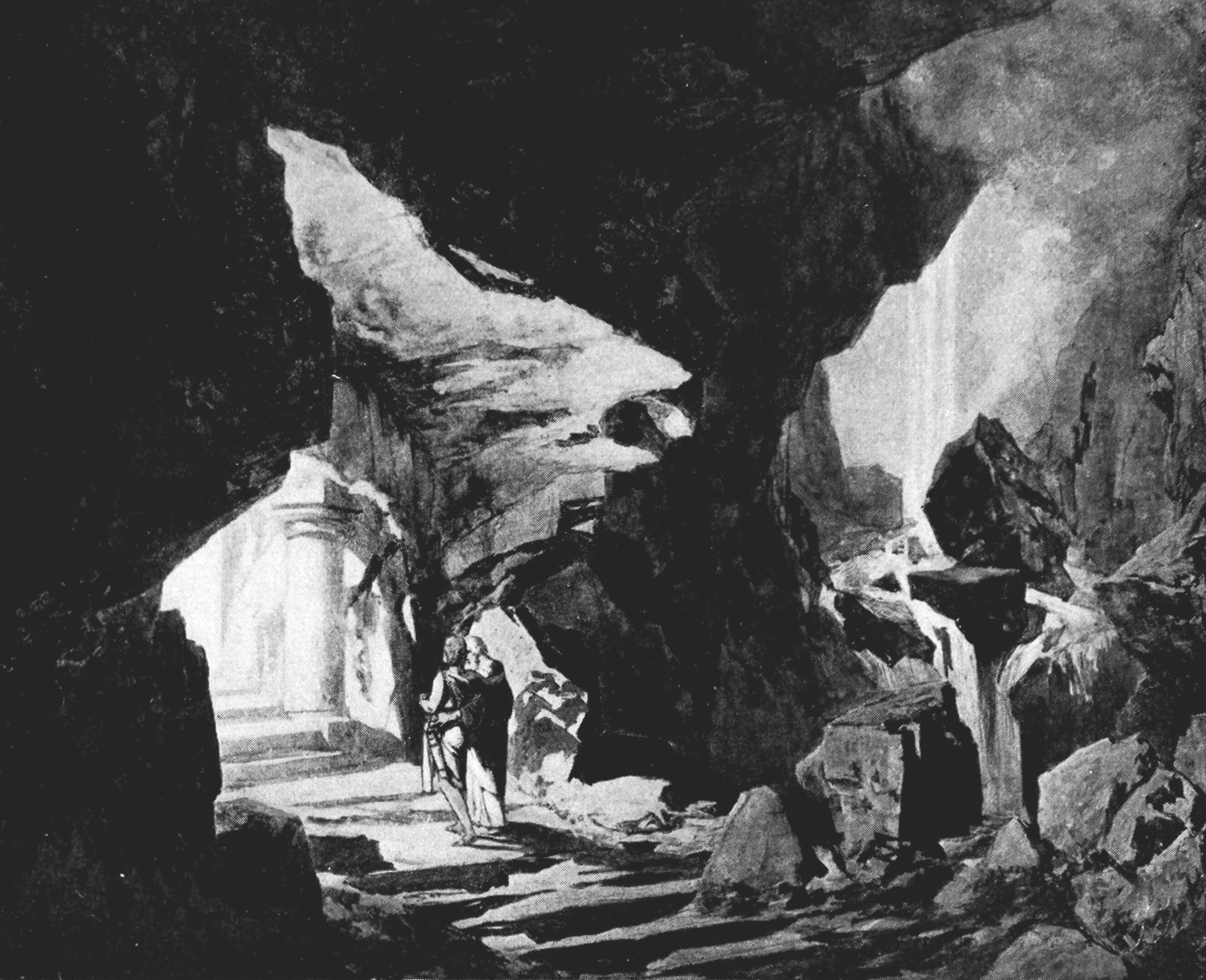
Scene design for the controversial 1903 production at the Metropolitan Opera: Gurnemanz leads Parsifal to Monsalvat (act 1)

For the first twenty years of its existence, the only staged performances of Parsifal took place in the Bayreuth Festspielhaus, the venue for which Wagner conceived the work (except eight private performances for Ludwig II at Munich in 1884 and 1885). Wagner had two reasons for wanting to keep Parsifal exclusively for the Bayreuth stage. First, he wanted to prevent it from degenerating into 'mere amusement' for an opera-going public. Only at Bayreuth could his last work be presented in the way envisaged by him—a tradition maintained by his wife, Cosima, long after his death. Second, he thought that the opera would provide an income for his family after his death if Bayreuth had the monopoly on its performance.

The Bayreuth authorities allowed unstaged performances to take place in various countries after Wagner's death (London in 1884, New York City in 1886, and Amsterdam in 1894) but they maintained an embargo on stage performances outside Bayreuth. On 24 December 1903, after receiving a court ruling that performances in the United States could not be prevented by Bayreuth, the New York Metropolitan Opera staged the complete opera, using many Bayreuth-trained singers. Cosima barred anyone involved in the New York production from working at Bayreuth in future performances. Unauthorized stage performances were also undertaken in Amsterdam in 1905, 1906 and 1908. There was a performance in Buenos Aires, in the Teatro Coliseo, on June 20, 1913, under Gino Marinuzzi.

The copyright on the opera expired at midnight on 31 December 1913. One press report read, "The moment is hungrily awaited by every important opera house in the world. One Continental performance is timed to begin half an hour past midnight, but at most places – over forty, as already announced – they are content to wait until a more comfortable time, generally the next evening". Parsifal was given on 1 January 1914 in the Teatro Comunale di Bologna with Giuseppe Borgatti. Some opera houses began their performances at midnight between 31 December 1913 and 1 January. The first authorized performance was staged at the Gran Teatre del Liceu in Barcelona: it began at 10:30pm Barcelona time, which was an hour behind Bayreuth. Such was the demand for Parsifal that it was presented in more than 50 European opera houses between 1 January and 1 August 1914.

=== Applause ===
At Bayreuth performances audiences do not applaud at the end of the first act. This tradition is the result of a misunderstanding arising from Wagner's desire at the premiere to maintain the serious mood of the opera. After much applause following the first and second acts, Wagner spoke to the audience and said that the cast would take no curtain calls until the end of the performance. This confused the audience, who remained silent at the end of the opera until Wagner addressed them again, saying that he did not mean that they could not applaud. After the performance Wagner complained, "Now I don't know. Did the audience like it or not?" At subsequent performances some believed that Wagner had wanted no applause until the very end, and there was silence after the first two acts. Eventually it became a Bayreuth tradition that no applause would be heard after the first act, but this was certainly not Wagner's idea. In fact, during the first Bayreuth performances, Wagner himself cried "Bravo!" as the flowermaidens made their exit in the second act, only to be hissed by other members of the audience. At some theatres other than Bayreuth, applause and curtain calls are normal practice after every act. Program notes until 2013 at the Metropolitan Opera in New York asked the audience not to applaud after act 1.

=== Post-war performances ===
Parsifal is one of the Wagner operas regularly presented at the Bayreuth Festival to this day. Among the more significant post-war productions was that directed in 1951 by Wieland Wagner, the composer's grandson. At the first Bayreuth Festival after World War II he presented a radical move away from literal representation of the hall of the Grail or the flowermaiden's bower. Instead, lighting effects and the bare minimum of scenery were used to complement Wagner's music. This production was heavily influenced by the ideas of the Swiss stage designer Adolphe Appia. The reaction to this production was extreme: Ernest Newman, Richard Wagner's biographer, described it as "not only the best Parsifal I have ever seen and heard, but one of the three or four most moving spiritual experiences of my life". Others were appalled that Wagner's stage directions were being flouted. The conductor of the 1951 production, Hans Knappertsbusch, on being asked how he could conduct such a disgraceful travesty, declared that right up until the dress rehearsal he imagined that the stage decorations were still to come. Knappertsbusch was particularly upset by the omission of the dove that appears over Parsifal's head at the end of the opera, which he claimed inspired him to give better performances. To placate his conductor Wieland arranged to reinstate the dove, which descended on a string. What Knappertsbusch did not realise was that Wieland had made the string long enough for the conductor to see the dove, but not for the audience. Wieland continued to modify and refine his Bayreuth production of Parsifal until his death in 1966. Martha Mödl created a "complex, tortured Kundry in Wieland Wagner's revolutionary production of Parsifal during the festival's first postwar season", and would remain the company's exclusive Kundry for the remainder of the decade.

== Roles ==
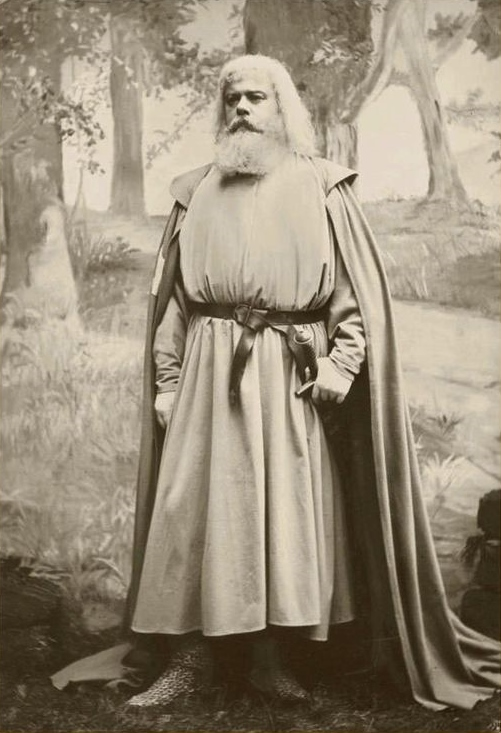
Emil Scaria as Gurnemanz, 1883

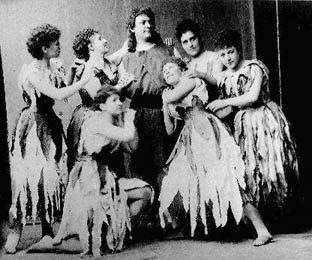
Hermann Winkelmann as Parsifal with flowermaidens, 1882

Roles, voice types, premiere casts 1882 and 1903 (Metropolitan Opera)
Role	Voice type	Premiere cast, 26 July 1882 Conductor: Hermann Levi	Met premiere cast, 24 December 1903 Conductor: Alfred Hertz
Parsifal, a youth	tenor	Hermann Winkelmann	Alois Burgstaller
Kundry, a messenger of the Grail	high dramatic soprano or dramatic mezzo-soprano	Amalie Materna	Milka Ternina
Gurnemanz, an elderly knight of the Grail	bass	Emil Scaria	Robert Blass
Amfortas, King of the Kingdom of the Grail	baritone	Theodor Reichmann	Anton van Rooy
Klingsor, an evil magician	bass-baritone	Karl Hill	Otto Goritz
Titurel, a retired king of the Kingdom of the Grail, father to Amfortas	bass	August Kindermann	Marcel Journet
Two Grail knights	tenor, bass	Anton Fuchs; Eugen Stumpf	Julius Bayer; Adolph Mühlmann
Four squires	soprano, alto, two tenors	Hermine Galfy; Mathilde Keil; Max Mikorey; Adolf von Hübbenet	Katherine Moran; Paula Braendle; Albert Reiss; Willy Harden
Six flowermaidens	three sopranos, three contraltos or six sopranos	Pauline Horson; Johanna Meta; Carrie Pringle; Johanna André; Hermine Galfy; Luise Belce	Isabelle Bouton; Ernesta Delsarta; Miss Förnsen; Elsa Harris; Lillian Heidelbach; Marcia Van Dresser
Voice from Above, Eine Stimme	contralto	Sophie Dompierre	Louise Homer
Knights of the Grail, squires, flowermaidens

== Summary ==
=== Act 1 ===
Prelude to act 1

Musical introduction to the work with a duration of c. 12–16 minutes.

Scene 1

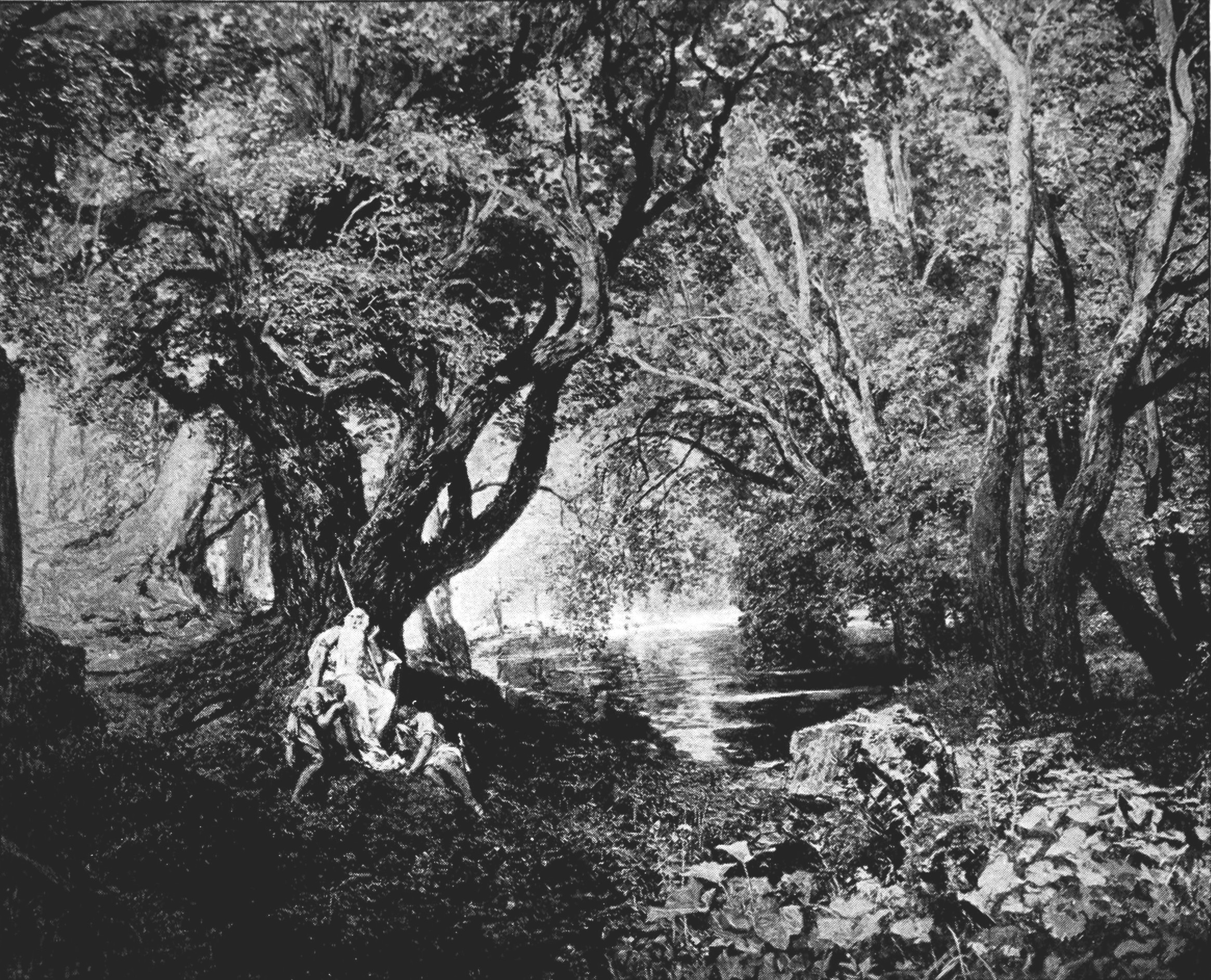
Gurnemanz and the squires, act 1, scene 1, in the 1903 performance of the work in New York

In a forest near the seat of the Grail and its knights, Gurnemanz, an elder knight of the Grail, wakes his young squires and leads them in morning prayer ("He! Ho! Waldhüter ihr"). Their king, Amfortas, has been stabbed by the Holy Spear, once bequeathed to him into his guardianship, and the wound will not heal.

A woman named Kundry arrives in a frenzy, with soothing balsam from Arabia. The squires eye Kundry with mistrust and question her. They believe Kundry to be an evil pagan witch. Gurnemanz restrains them and defends her. He relates the history of Amfortas and the spear; it was stolen from him by the failed knight Klingsor.

Gurnemanz singing "Titurel, der fromme Held", excerpt from a 1942 recording

Gurnemanz's squires ask how it is that he knew Klingsor. Gurnemanz tells them that Klingsor was once a respected knight. Unable to cleanse himself of sin, he castrated himself in an effort to attain purity, but instead became an evil monstrosity.

A boy named Parsifal enters, carrying a swan which he has killed. Shocked, Gurnemanz speaks sternly to the lad, saying that this land is a holy place, not to be defiled by murder. Remorsefully the young man breaks his bow in agitation and casts it aside. Kundry tells him that she has seen that his mother has died. Parsifal, who cannot remember much of his past ("I do not know", he repeats when questioned), is crestfallen.

Gurnemanz wonders if Parsifal might be the predicted "pure fool"; he invites Parsifal to witness the Ceremony of the Uncovering of the Grail, which renews the knights' immortality.

Orchestral interlude – Verwandlungsmusik (Transformation music)

Scene 2

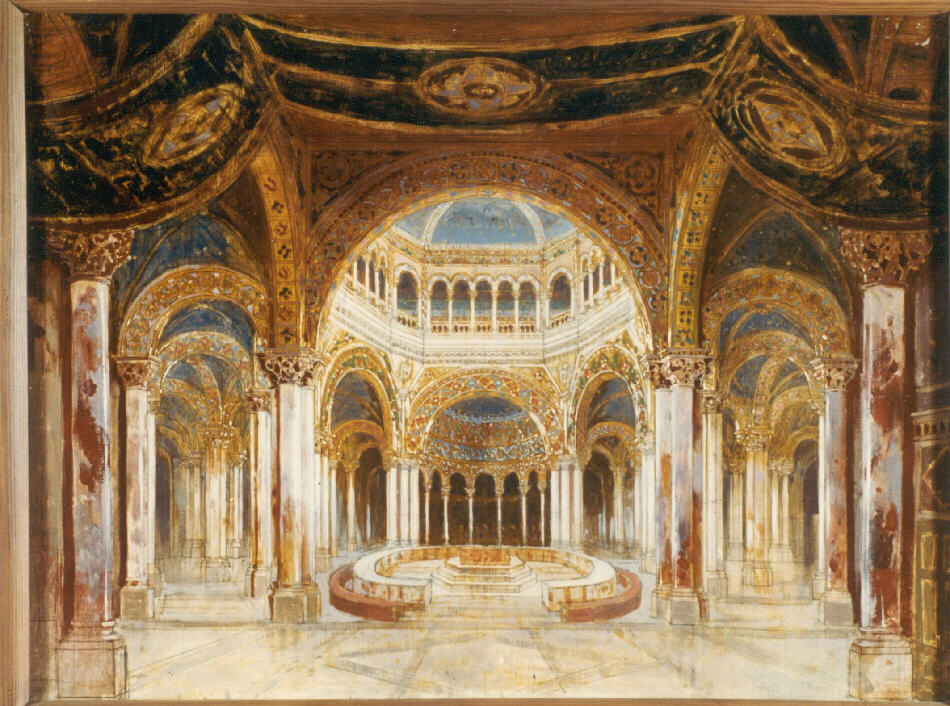
Paul von Joukowsky: Design for the hall of the Grail (second scenes of acts 1 and 3), 1882

The voice of the retired king Titurel resounds from a vaulted crypt in the background, demanding that his son Amfortas uncover the Grail and serve his kingly office ("Mein Sohn Amfortas, bist du am Amt?"). Only through the immortality-conferring power of the sacred chalice and the Saviour's blood contained therein may Titurel himself, now aged and very feeble, live on. Amfortas is overcome with shame and suffering ("Wehvolles Erbe, dem ich verfallen"). He, the chosen guardian of the holiest of relics, has succumbed to sin and lost the Holy Spear, suffering an ever-bleeding wound in the process; uncovering the Grail causes him great pain. The young man appears to suffer with him, clutching convulsively at his heart. The knights and Titurel urge Amfortas to reveal the Grail ("Enthüllet den Gral!"), and he finally does. The dark hall is illuminated by its radiant light and the round table of the knights is miraculously filled with wine and bread. Slowly all the knights and squires disappear, leaving Gurnemanz and the youth alone. Gurnemanz asks the youth if he has understood what he has seen. As the boy is unable to answer the question, Gurnemanz dismisses him as just an ordinary fool after all and angrily exiles him from the realm with a warning to let the swans in the Grail Kingdom live in peace.

=== Act 2 ===
Prelude to act 2 – Klingsors Zauberschloss (Klingsor's Magic Castle)

Musical introduction of c. 2–3 minutes.

Scene 1

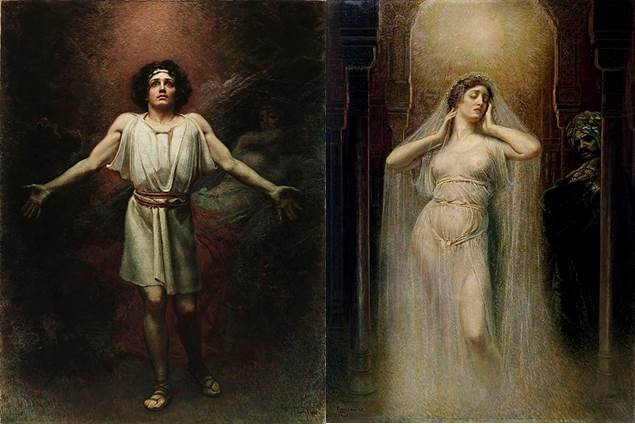
Parsifal and Kundry, two paintings by Rogelio de Egusquiza, 1910 and 1906

Klingsor's castle and enchanted garden. Waking her from her sleep, Klingsor conjures up Kundry, now transformed into an incredibly alluring woman. He calls her by many names: First Sorceress (Urteufelin), Hell's Rose (Höllenrose), Herodias, Gundryggia and, lastly, Kundry. She mocks his self-castrated condition but cannot resist his power. He resolves to send her to seduce Parsifal and ruin him as she ruined Amfortas before.

Scene 2

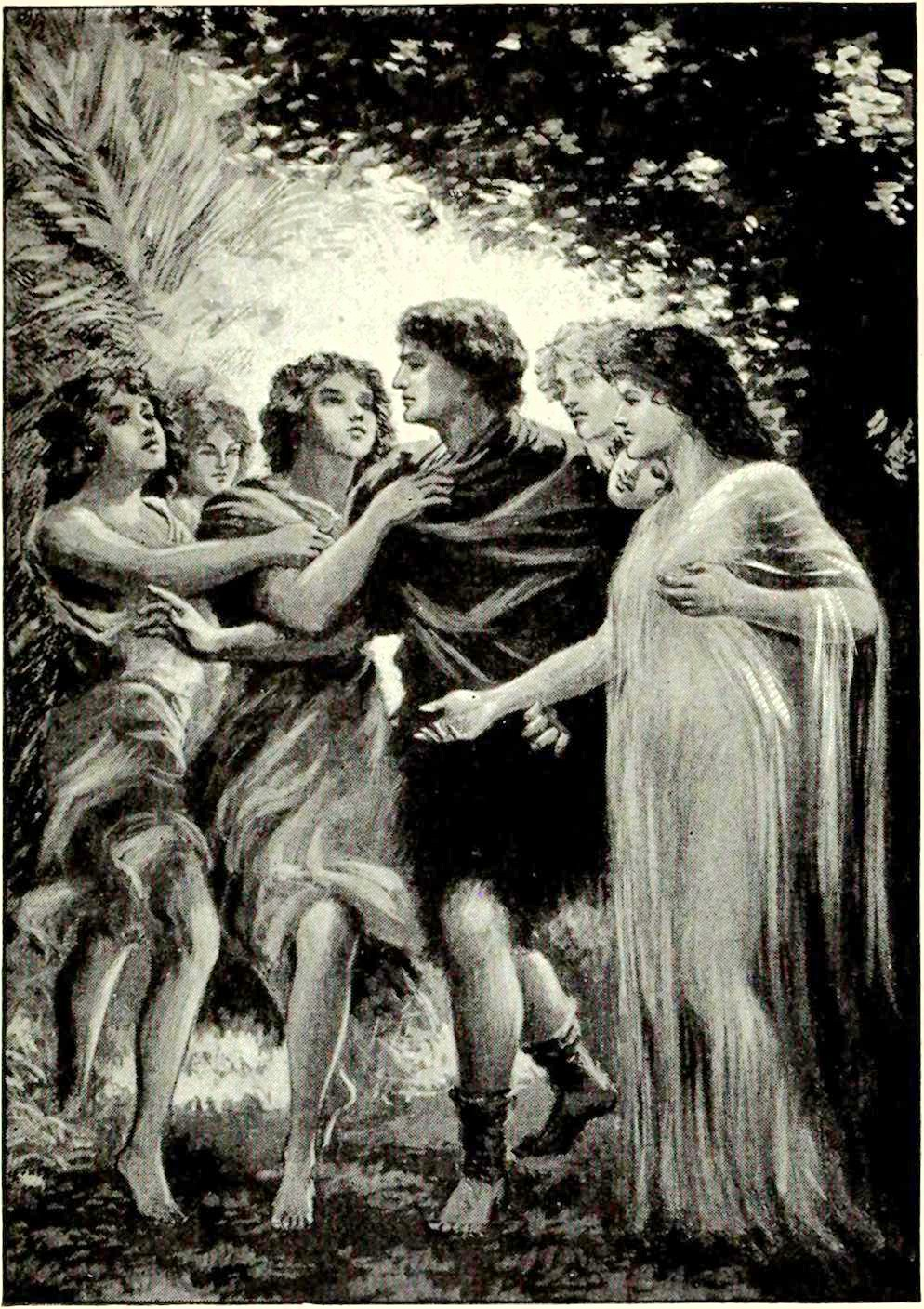
Scene from Parsifal from the Victrola book of the opera, 1917

The youth walks into a wondrous garden, surrounded by beautiful and seductive flowermaidens. They call to him and entwine themselves about him while chiding him for wounding their lovers ("Komm, komm, holder Knabe!"), yet the boy in his childlike innocent naïveté doesn't comprehend their temptations and shows only little interest in them. The flowermaidens soon fight and bicker among themselves to win his devotion, to the point that he is about to flee, but another voice suddenly calls out "Parsifal!". The youth finally recalls this name is what his mother called him when she appeared in his dreams. The flowermaidens back away from him and call him a fool as they leave him and Kundry alone.

Parsifal wonders if the whole Garden is but a dream and asks how it is that Kundry knows his name. Kundry tells him she learned it from his mother ("Ich sah das Kind an seiner Mutter Brust"), who had loved him and tried to shield him from his father's fate, the mother he had abandoned and who had finally died of grief. She reveals many parts of Parsifal's history to him and he is stricken with remorse, blaming himself for his mother's death. Kundry tells him that this realization is a first sign of understanding and that, with a kiss, she can help him understand the love that had once united his parents, wanting thus to awake in Parsifal the first pangs of desire. However, as she kisses Parsifal, the youth suddenly recoils in pain and cries out Amfortas' name: having just felt for the first time material desire with Kundry's kiss, Parsifal finds himself in the same position in which Amfortas had been seduced and he feels the wounded king's pain and suffering of evil and sin burning in his own soul. Only now does Parsifal understand Amfortas' passion during the Grail Ceremony ("Amfortas! Die Wunde! Die Wunde!").

Furious that her ploy has failed, Kundry tells Parsifal that if he can feel compassion for Amfortas, then he should also be able to feel it for her. In a distant past, she saw the Redeemer and mockingly laughed at His pains in malice. As a punishment for this sin she has been cursed and bound by Klingsor and has fallen under his yoke. The curse condemns her to never be able to die and find peace and redemption. She cannot weep, only jeer diabolically. Longing for deliverance, she has been waiting for ages for a man to free her from her curse and yearns to once more meet the Saviour's forgiving gaze, but her search for her Redeemer in the end only ever turns into a desire to find her salvation in earthly desire with those who fall for her charms. All her penitent endeavours eventually transform into a renewed life of sin and a continued unredeemed existence in bondage to Klingsor. When Parsifal still resists her, Kundry curses him through the power of her own accursed being to wander without ever finding the Kingdom of the Grail again, and finally calls on her master Klingsor to help her.

Klingsor appears on the castle rampart and hurls the Holy Spear at Parsifal to destroy him. Parsifal seizes the spear in his hand and makes with it the sign of the Cross, banishing Klingsor's dark sorcery. The whole castle with Klingsor himself suddenly sinks as if by terrible earthquake and the enchanted garden withers. As Parsifal leaves, he tells Kundry that she knows where she can find him.

=== Act 3 ===
Prelude to act 3 – Parsifals Irrfahrt (Parsifal's Wandering)

Musical introduction of c. 4–6 minutes.

Scene 1

The scene takes place many years later. Gurnemanz is now aged and bent, living alone as a hermit. It is Good Friday. He hears moaning near his hut and finds Kundry lying unconscious in the brush, just as he had many years before ("Sie! Wieder da!"). He revives her using water from the Holy Spring, but she will only speak the word "serve" ("Dienen"). Looking into the forest, Gurnemanz sees a figure approaching, armed and in full armour. The stranger removes his helmet and Gurnemanz recognizes the lad who shot the swan; to his amazement the knight also bears the Holy Spear.

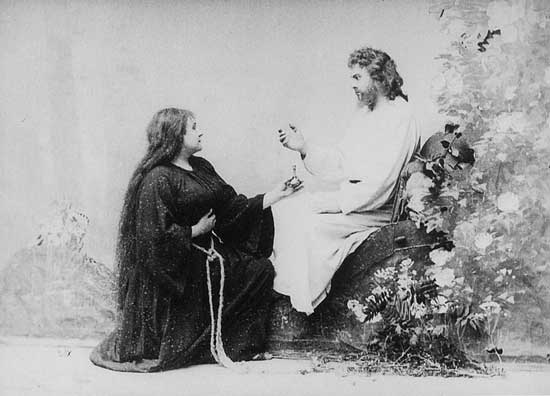
Amalie Materna as Kundry with Ernest Van Dyck as Parsifal in act 3, scene 1, Bayreuth 1889

Kundry washes Parsifal's feet and Gurnemanz anoints him with water from the Holy Spring, recognizing him as the pure fool, now enlightened by compassion and freed from guilt through purifying suffering, and proclaims him the foretold new king of the knights of the Grail.

Parsifal looks about and comments on the beauty of the meadow. Gurnemanz explains that today is Good Friday, when all the world is purified and renewed.

A dark orchestral interlude leads into the solemn gathering of the knights.

Orchestral interlude – Verwandlungsmusik (Transformation music) – Titurels Totenfeier (Titurel's Funeral March)

Scene 2

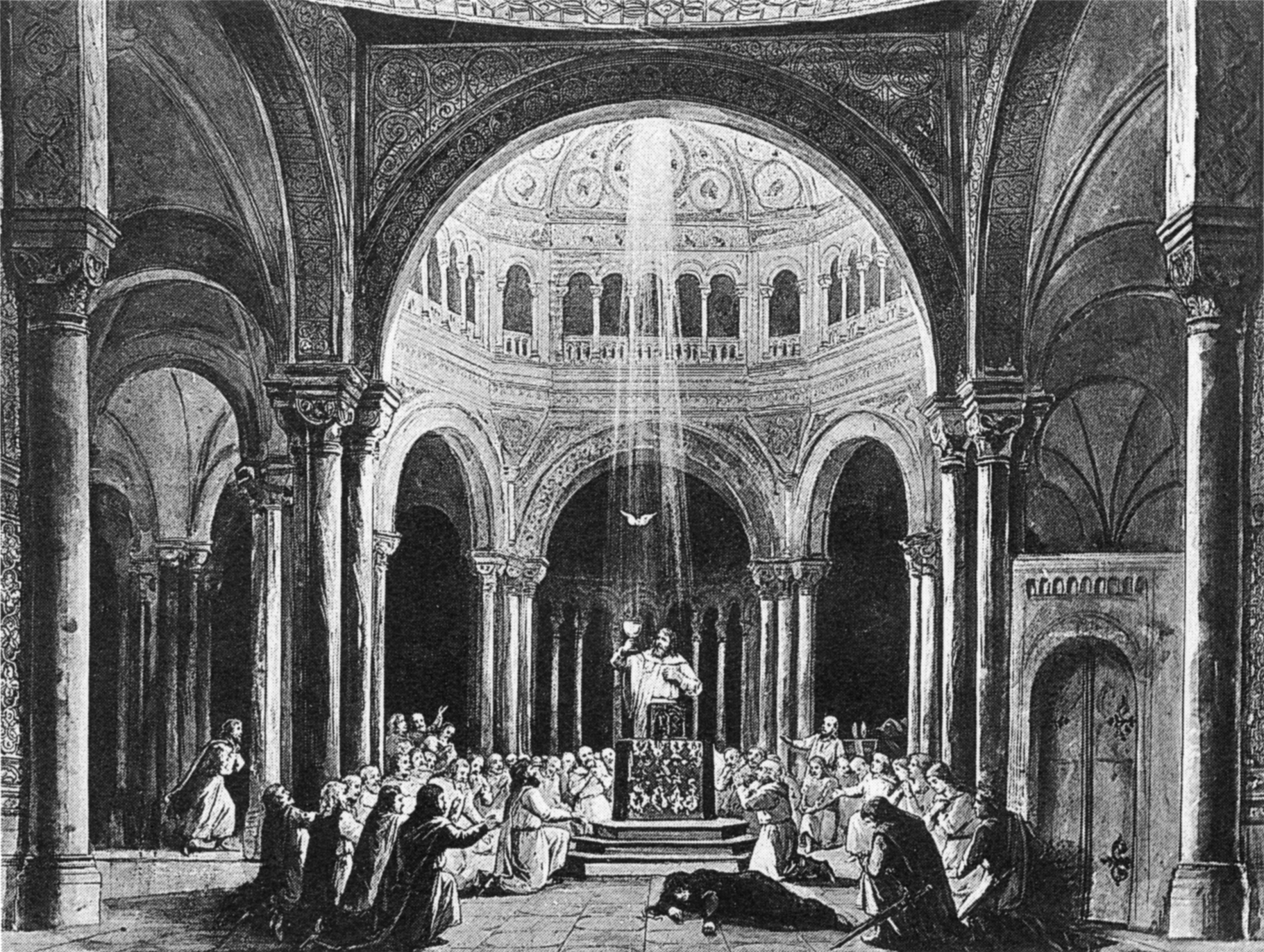
End of act 3 in the original 1882 production (according to a painting by Theodor Pixis), original design by Paul von Joukowsky

Within the Castle of the Grail, Titurel's funeral is to take place. Mourning processions of knights bring the deceased Titurel in a coffin and the Grail in its shrine, as well as Amfortas on his litter, to the Grail hall ("Geleiten wir im bergenden Schrein"). The knights desperately urge Amfortas to keep his promise and at least once more, for the very last time uncover the Grail again, but Amfortas, in a frenzy, says he will never again show the Grail, as doing so would just prolong his unbearable torment. Instead, he commands the knights to kill him and end with his suffering also the shame he has brought on the brotherhood. At this moment, Parsifal appears and declares only one weapon can help here: only the same spear that inflicted the wound can now close it ("Nur eine Waffe taugt"). He touches Amfortas' side with the Holy Spear and both heals the wound and absolves him from sin. The spear, now reunited with the Holy Grail, starts to bleed with the same divine blood that is contained within the sacred chalice. Extolling the virtue of compassion and blessing Amfortas' suffering for making a pure fool knowing, Parsifal replaces Amfortas in his kingly office and orders to unveil the Grail, which is never to be hidden again. As the Grail glows ever brighter with light and a white dove descends from the top of the dome and hovers over Parsifal's head, a chorus mysticus of all the knights praises the miracle of salvation ("Höchsten Heiles Wunder!") and proclaims the redemption of the Redeemer ("Erlösung dem Erlöser!"). Kundry, also at the very last released from her curse and redeemed, slowly sinks lifeless to the ground with her gaze resting on Parsifal, who raises the Grail in blessing over the worshipping knighthood.

== Reactions ==
Since Parsifal could initially only be seen at the Bayreuth Festival, the first presentation in 1882 was attended by many notable figures. Reaction was varied. Some thought that Parsifal marked a weakening of Wagner's abilities, many others saw the work as a crowning achievement. The famous critic and Wagner's theoretical opponent Eduard Hanslick gave his opinion that "The Third act may be counted the most unified and the most atmospheric. It is not the richest musically," going on to note: "And Wagner's creative powers? For a man of his age and his method they are astounding". But "It would be foolishness to declare that Wagner's fantasy, and specifically his musical invention, has retained the freshness and facility of yore. One cannot help but discern sterility and prosaicism, together with increasing longwindedness."

The conductor Felix Weingartner found that: "The flowermaidens' costumes showed extraordinary lack of taste, but the singing was incomparable… When the curtain had been rung down on the final scene and we were walking down the hill, I seemed to hear the words of Goethe 'and you can say you were present'. The Parsifal performances of 1882 were artistic events of supreme interest and it is my pride and joy that I participated in them." Many contemporary composers shared Weingartner's opinion. Hugo Wolf was a student at the time of the 1882 Festival, yet still managed to find money for tickets to see Parsifal twice. He emerged overwhelmed: "Colossal – Wagner's most inspired, sublimest creation." He reiterated this view in a postcard from Bayreuth in 1883: "Parsifal is without doubt by far the most beautiful and sublime work in the whole field of Art."

Gustav Mahler was also present in 1883 and he wrote to a friend: "I can hardly describe my present state to you. When I came out of the Festspielhaus, completely spellbound, I understood that the greatest and most painful revelation had just been made to me, and that I would carry it unspoiled for the rest of my life." Max Reger, in a later account, simply noted that "When I first heard Parsifal at Bayreuth I was fifteen. I cried for two weeks and then became a musician." That was in 1888. Jean Sibelius, visiting the Festival in 1894, said: "Nothing in the world has made so overwhelming an impression on me. All my innermost heart-strings throbbed… I cannot begin to tell you how Parsifal has transported me. Everything I do seems so cold and feeble by its side. That is really something."

Claude Debussy thought the characters and plot ludicrous, but nevertheless in 1903 wrote that musically it was: "Incomparable and bewildering, splendid and strong. Parsifal is one of the loveliest monuments of sound ever raised to the serene glory of music." He was later to write to Ernest Chausson that he had deleted a scene he had just written for his own opera Pelléas et Melisande because he had discovered in the music for it "the ghost of old Klingsor, alias R. Wagner". Alban Berg described Parsifal in 1909 as "magnificent, overwhelming".

However, some notable guests of the Festival took a more acerbic view of the experience. Mark Twain visited Bayreuth in 1891: "I was not able to detect in the vocal parts of Parsifal anything that might with confidence be called rhythm or tune or melody… Singing! It does seem the wrong name to apply to it… In Parsifal there is a hermit named Gurnemanz who stands on the stage in one spot and practices by the hour, while first one and then another of the cast endures what he can of it and then retires to die." Performance standards may have contributed to such reactions; George Bernard Shaw, a committed Wagnerite, commented in 1894 that: "The opening performance of Parsifal this season was, from the purely musical point of view, as far as the principal singers were concerned, simply an abomination. The bass howled, the tenor bawled, the baritone sang flat and the soprano, when she condescended to sing at all and did not merely shout her words, screamed…"

During a break from composing The Rite of Spring, Igor Stravinsky traveled to the Bayreuth Festival at the invitation of Sergei Diaghilev to see the work. Stravinsky was repulsed by the "quasi-religious atmosphere" of the festival. Stravinsky's repulsion is speculated to be due to his agnosticism, of which he recanted later in life.

== Interpretation and influence ==
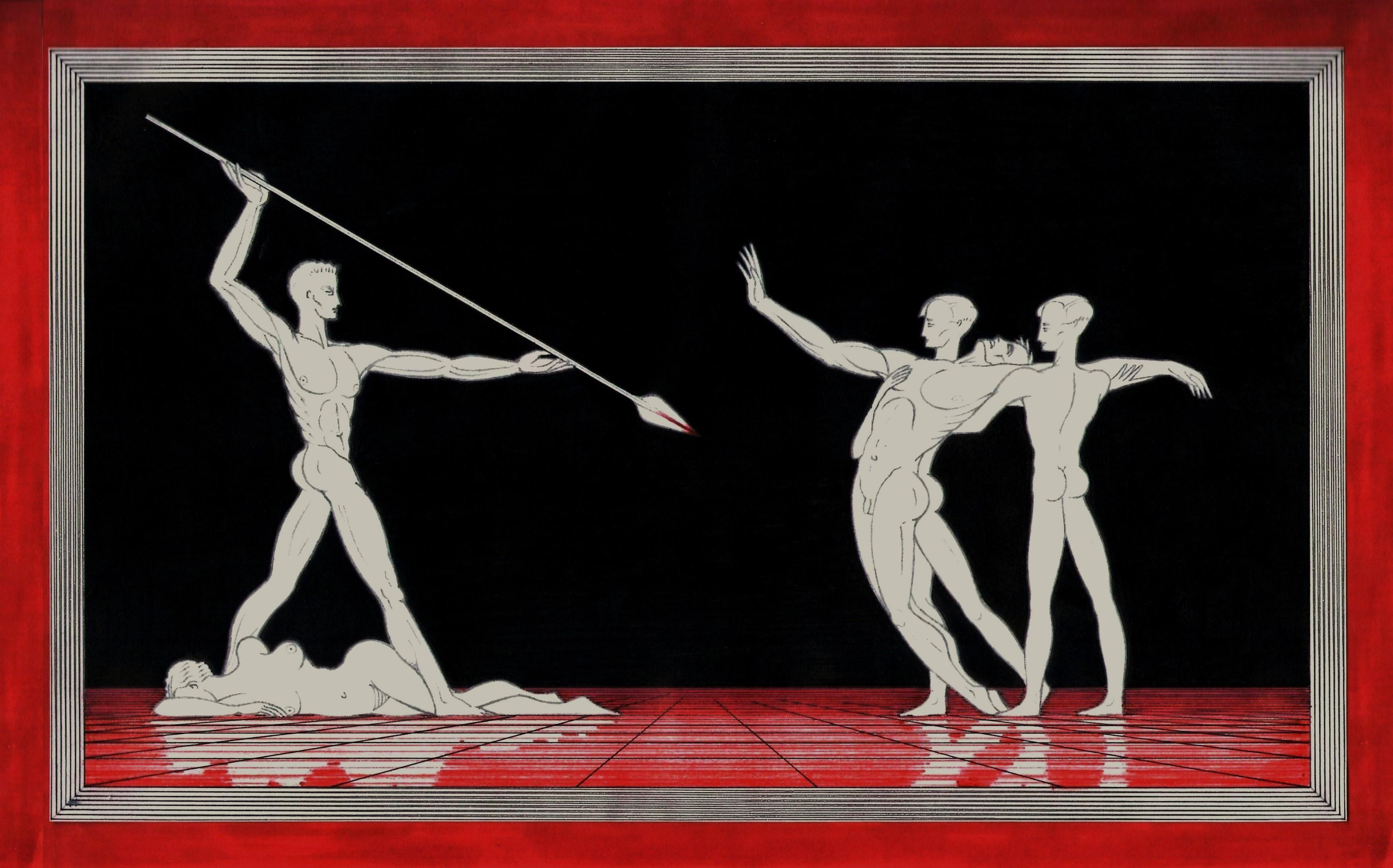
Scene design for act 3 by Arnaldo dell'Ira, using classical and classicist motives: "Nur eine Waffe taugt" (c. 1930)

Wagner's last work, Parsifal has been both influential and controversial. The use of Christian symbols in Parsifal (the Grail, the spear, references to the Redeemer) together with its restriction to Bayreuth for almost 30 years sometimes led to performances being regarded almost as a religious rite. However, Wagner never actually refers to Jesus Christ by name in the opera, only to "The Redeemer". In his essay "Religion and Art", Wagner described the use of Christian imagery thus:

When religion becomes artificial, art has a duty to rescue it. Art can show that the symbols which religions would have us believe literally true are actually figurative. Art can idealize those symbols, and so reveal the profound truths they contain.

The critic Eduard Hanslick objected to the religious air surrounding Parsifal even at the premiere: "The question of whether Parsifal should really be withheld from all theatres and limited to ... Bayreuth was naturally on all tongues ... I must state here that the church scenes in Parsifal did not make the offensive impression on me that others and I had been led to expect from reading the libretto. They are religious situations – but for all their earnest dignity they are not in the style of the church, but completely in the style of the opera. Parsifal is an opera, call it a 'stage festival' or 'consecrational stage festival' if you will."

=== Schopenhauer ===
Wagner had been greatly impressed with his reading of the German philosopher Arthur Schopenhauer in 1854, and this deeply affected his thoughts and practice on music and art. Most writers (e.g. Bryan Magee) see Parsifal as Wagner's last great espousal of Schopenhauerian philosophy. Parsifal can heal Amfortas and redeem Kundry because he shows compassion, which Schopenhauer saw as the highest manifestation of human morality. Moreover, Parsifal displays compassion in the face of sexual temptation (act 2, scene 2); Schopenhauerian philosophy suggests that the only escape from the ever-present temptations of human life is through negation of the Will, and overcoming sexual temptation is in particular a strong form of negation of the Will. Schopenhauer also claims that compassion should be extended to non-human sentient beings as well, supporting this claim by the lives of Christian saints and mystics and the Indian religions of Hinduism and Buddhism. This worldview finds in Parsifal its expression in the holy status of animals within the Kingdom of the Grail, in the shocked response to Parsifal's "murder" of the swan (act 1, scene 1), which awakens in the youth the first unaware throb of compassion, or in Gurnemanz's "sermon" about the Good Friday Spell affecting nature and humanity's relation towards nature (act 3, scene 1). Wagner himself in his older age became an advocate of vegetarianism and an opponent of vivisection, participating in an anti-vivisectionist petition to the Reichstag in 1879; he also professed what might be called early environmentalist sentiments. As the exact opposite of compassion and therefore as the ultimate moral evil Schopenhauer sees the act of Schadenfreude, the enjoying of the suffering of another living being; it is precisely this sin of which Kundry is guilty when she maliciously laughs in mocking pride at the sufferings of the Redeemer and as a result of which she falls under Klingsor's curse (recounted in act 2, scene 2), broken only at the moment when she is again capable to weep and thus express compassion during the Good Friday Spell (act 3, scene 1). When viewed in this light, Parsifal, with its emphasis on Mitleid ("compassion") is a natural follow-on to Tristan und Isolde, where Schopenhauer's influence is perhaps more obvious, with its focus on Sehnen ("yearning"). Indeed, Wagner originally considered including Parsifal as a character in act 3 of Tristan, but later rejected the idea.

=== Nietzsche ===
Friedrich Nietzsche, who was originally a champion of Wagner and Schopenhauer, chose later to use Parsifal as the ground for his breach with Wagner. Nietzsche took the work as an exemplar of the self-denying, life-denying, and otherworldly Christian slave morality motivated by the "will to nothingness", as opposed to the self-affirming and earthly master morality of pre-Christian ruling classes and the strong motivated by the "will to power". An extended critique of Parsifal opens the third essay ("What Is the Meaning of Ascetic Ideals?") of On the Genealogy of Morality. In Nietzsche contra Wagner he wrote:

Parsifal is a work of perfidy, of vindictiveness, of a secret attempt to poison the presuppositions of life – a bad work. The preaching of chastity remains an incitement to anti-nature: I despise everyone who does not experience Parsifal as an attempted assassination of basic ethics.

Despite this attack on the subject matter, he also admitted that the music was sublime: "Moreover, apart from all irrelevant questions (as to what the use of this music can or ought to be) and on purely aesthetic grounds; has Wagner ever done anything better?" (Letter to Peter Gast, 1887).

=== Racism debate ===
Some writers see in the opera a promotion of racism or antisemitism. One line of argument suggests that Parsifal was written in support of the ideas of the French diplomat and racial theorist Count Arthur de Gobineau, expressed most extensively in his Essay on the Inequality of the Human Races. Parsifal is proposed as the "pure-blooded" (i.e. Aryan) hero who overcomes Klingsor, who is perceived as a Jewish stereotype, particularly since he opposes the quasi-Christian knights of the Grail. Such claims remain heavily debated, since there is nothing explicit in the libretto to support them. Wagner never mentions such ideas in his many writings, and Cosima Wagner's diaries, which relate in great detail Wagner's thoughts over the last 14 years of his life (including the period covering the composition and first performance of Parsifal) never mention any such intention. Having met Gobineau for the first time very briefly in 1876, it was nonetheless only in 1880 that Wagner read Gobineau's essay. However, the libretto for Parsifal had already been completed by 1877, and the original drafts of the story even date back to 1857. Besides the question of chronology, an eventual meeting in person between Wagner and Gobineau was also accompanied by mutual disagreements and quarrels; e.g., on 3 June 1881 Wagner is reported to have "exploded in favour of Christian theories in contrast to racial ones". Despite this, Gobineau is sometimes cited as an inspiration for Parsifal.

The related question of whether the opera contains a specifically antisemitic message is also debated. Some of Wagner's contemporaries and commentators (e.g. Hans von Wolzogen and Ernest Newman) who analysed Parsifal at length, make no mention of any antisemitic interpretations. However the critics Paul Lindau and Max Nordbeck, present at the world premiere, noted in their reviews how the work accorded with Wagner's anti-Jewish sentiments. Similar interpretive conflict continues even today; some of the more recent commentators continue to highlight the perceived antisemitic or anti-Judaic nature of the opera, and find correspondences with antisemitic passages found in Wagner's writings and articles of the period, while others deny such claims, seeing for example the opposition between the realm of the Grail and Klingsor's domain as portraying a conflict between the sphere embodying the world-view of Wagner's Schopenhauerian Christianity and a pagan sphere more generally.

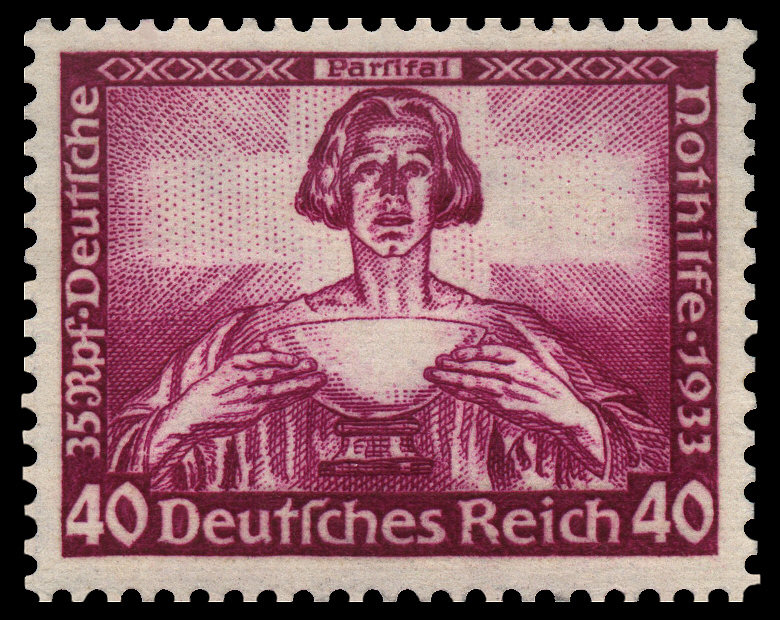
German stamp showing Parsifal with the Grail, November 1933

The conductor of the premiere was Hermann Levi, the court conductor at the Munich Opera. Since King Ludwig was sponsoring the production, much of the orchestra was drawn from the ranks of the Munich Opera, including the conductor. Wagner objected to Parsifal being conducted by a Jew (Levi's father was in fact a rabbi). Wagner first suggested that Levi should convert to Christianity, which Levi declined to do. Wagner then wrote to King Ludwig that he had decided to accept Levi despite the fact that (he alleged) he had received complaints that "of all pieces, this most Christian of works" should be conducted by a Jew. When the King expressed his satisfaction at this, replying that "human beings are basically all brothers", Wagner wrote to the king angrily: "If I have friendly and sympathetic dealings with many of these people, it is only because I consider the Jewish race as the born enemy of pure humanity and all that is noble about it (sic)".

Seventy-one years later, the Jewish bass-baritone George London performed in the role of Amfortas at Neu Bayreuth, causing some controversy.

It has been claimed that Parsifal was denounced as being "ideologically unacceptable" in Nazi Germany and that the Nazis placed a de facto ban on Parsifal because of what many scholars see as the presence of themes such as compassion, Schopenhauerian negation of the will, renunciation of desires, asceticism and even non-violence and anti-militarism in the work's libretto. Some of the Nazi officials and leaders may have had certain doubts about the work. In his 1930 book The Myth of the Twentieth Century the Nazi ideologue Alfred Rosenberg expressed the view that "Parsifal represents a church-influenced enfeeblement in favour of the value of renunciation". According to Joseph Goebbels' diaries, Adolf Hitler too had apparently some reservations about Parsifal, particularly about what he called its "Christian mystical style". Despite this, there were in fact 26 performances at the Bayreuth Festival between 1934 and 1939 and 23 performances at the Deutsche Oper Berlin between 1939 and 1942. However, Parsifal was not performed at Bayreuth during World War II, a significant omission since the work, with the exception of one year, had been an annual fixture of the Festival since 1882.

== Music ==
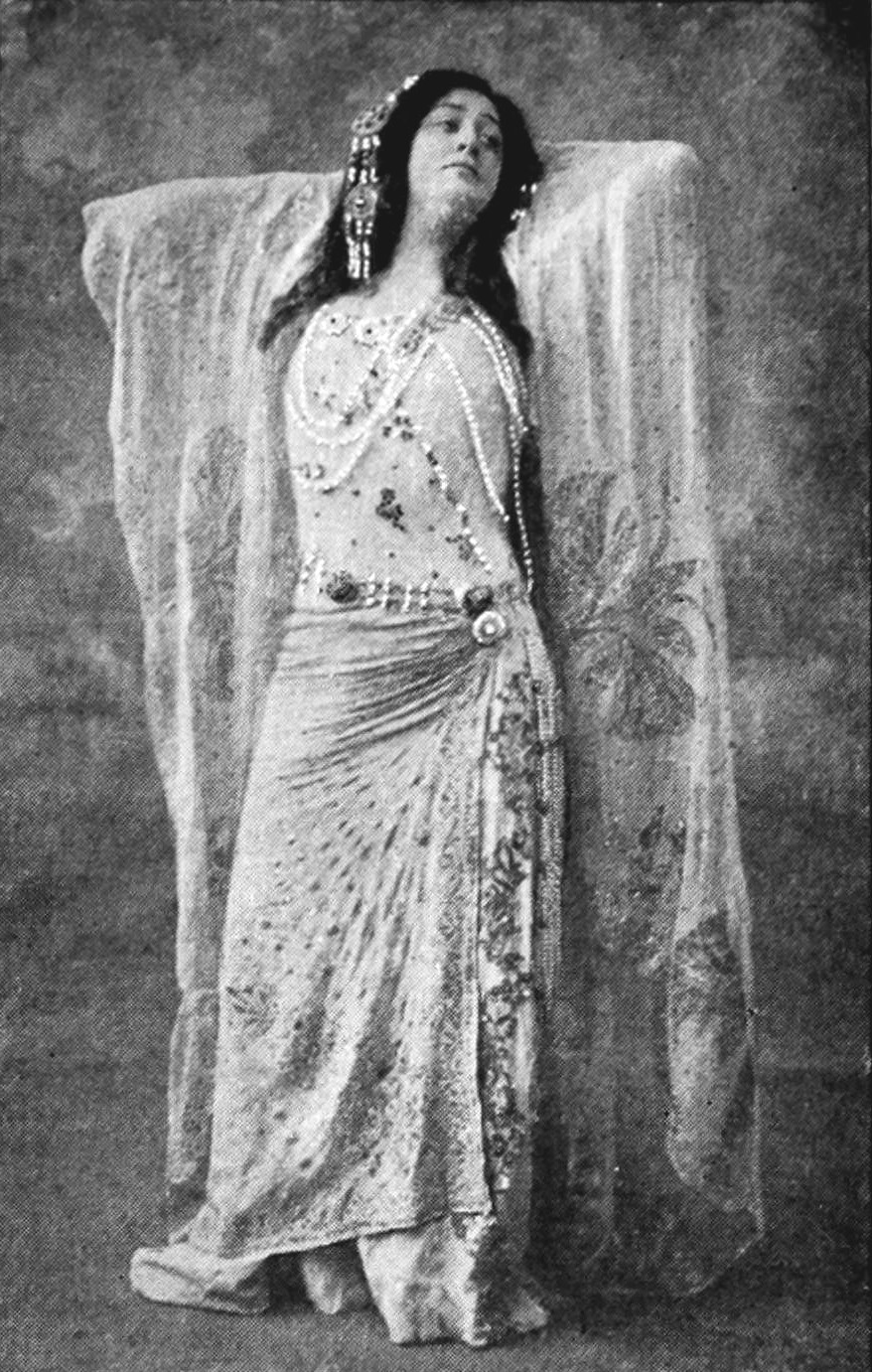
Margaret Matzenauer as Kundry. She made her unexpected debut in the role in 1912 at the New York Met.

=== Leitmotifs ===
A leitmotif is a recurring musical theme within a particular piece of music, associated with a particular character, object, event or emotion. Wagner is the composer most often associated with leitmotifs, and Parsifal makes liberal use of them. Wagner did not specifically identify or name leitmotifs in the score of Parsifal (any more than he did in any other of his scores), although his wife Cosima mentions statements he made about some of them in her diary. However, Wagner's followers (notably Hans von Wolzogen whose guide to Parsifal was published in 1882) named, wrote about and made references to these motifs, and they were highlighted in piano arrangements of the score. Wagner's own reaction to such naming of motifs in the score was one of disgust: "In the end people believe that such nonsense happens by my suggestion."

The opening prelude introduces two important leitmotifs, generally referred to as the Communion theme and the theme of the Grail. These two, and Parsifal's own motif, are repeated during the course of the opera. Other characters, especially Klingsor, Amfortas, and "The Voice", which sings the so-called Tormotif ("Fool's motive"), have their own particular leitmotifs. Wagner uses the Dresden amen to represent the Grail, this motif being a sequence of notes he would have known since his childhood in Dresden.

=== Chromaticism ===
Many music theorists have used Parsifal to explore difficulties in analyzing the chromaticism of late 19th century music. Theorists such as David Lewin and Richard Cohn have explored the importance of certain pitches and harmonic progressions both in structuring and symbolizing the work. The unusual harmonic progressions of the leitmotifs that structure the piece, plus the extensive chromaticism of act 2 and the preludes to acts 2 and 3, contribute to the work's complexity.

=== Notable excerpts ===
As is common in mature Wagner operas, Parsifal was composed such that each act was a continuous flow of music; hence there are no free-standing arias in the work. However, a number of orchestral excerpts from the opera were arranged by Wagner himself, and remain in the concert repertory. The prelude to act 1 is frequently performed either alone or in conjunction with an arrangement of the "Good Friday" music which accompanies the second half of act 3, scene 1. Kundry's long solo in act 2 ("Ich sah das Kind") is occasionally performed in concert, as is Amfortas' lament from act 1 ("Wehvolles Erbe").

=== Instrumentation ===
The score for Parsifal calls for three flutes, three oboes, one English horn, three clarinets in B-flat and A, one bass clarinet in B-flat and A, three bassoons, one contrabassoon; four horns in F, three trumpets in F, three trombones, one tuba, 6 onstage trumpets in F, 6 onstage trombones; a percussion section that includes four timpani (requiring two players), tenor drums, 4 onstage church bells, one onstage thunder machine; two harps and strings. Parsifal is one of only two works by Wagner in which he used the contrabassoon. (The other is the Symphony in C.)

The bells that draw the knights to the Grail ceremony at Monsalvat in acts 1 and 3 have often proved problematic to stage. For the earlier performances of Parsifal in Bayreuth, Wagner had the Parsifal bell, a piano frame with four strings, constructed as a substitute for church bells. For the first performances, the bells were combined with tam-tam and gongs. However, the bell was used with the tuba, four tam-tams tuned to the pitch of the four chime notes and another tam-tam on which a roll is executed by using a drumstick. In modern-day performances, the Parsifal bell has been replaced with tubular bells or synthesizers to produce the desired notes. The thunder machine is used in the moment of the destruction of Klingsor's castle.

=== Recordings ===
Parsifal was expressly composed for the stage at Bayreuth and many of the most famous recordings of the opera come from live performances on that stage. In the pre-LP era, Karl Muck conducted excerpts from the opera at Bayreuth. These are still considered some of the best performances of the opera on disc. They also contain the only sound evidence of the bells constructed for the work's premiere, which were melted down for scrap during World War II.

Hans Knappertsbusch was the conductor most closely associated with Parsifal at Bayreuth in the post-war years, and the performances under his baton in 1951 marked the re-opening of the Bayreuth Festival after World War II. These historic performances were recorded and are available on the Teldec label in mono sound. Knappertsbusch recorded the opera again for Philips in 1962 in stereo, and this release is often considered to be the classic Parsifal recording. There are also many "unofficial" live recordings from Bayreuth, capturing virtually every Parsifal cast ever conducted by Knappertsbusch. Pierre Boulez (1971) and James Levine (1985) have also made recordings of the opera at Bayreuth that were released on Deutsche Grammophon and Philips. The Boulez recording is one of the fastest on record, and the Levine one of the slowest.

Amongst other recordings, those conducted by Georg Solti, James Levine (with the Metropolitan Opera Orchestra), Herbert von Karajan, and Daniel Barenboim (the latter two both conducting the Berlin Philharmonic) have been widely praised. The Karajan recording was voted "Record of the Year" in the 1981 Gramophone Awards. Also highly regarded is a recording of Parsifal under the baton of Rafael Kubelík originally made for Deutsche Grammophon, now reissued on Arts & Archives.

On the 14 December 2013 broadcast of BBC Radio 3's CD Review – Building a Library, music critic David Nice surveyed recordings of Parsifal and recommended the recording by the Symphonieorchester des Bayerischen Rundfunks, Rafael Kubelik (conductor), as the best available choice.

=== Filmed versions ===
In addition to a number of staged performances available on DVD, Parsifal was adapted for the screen by Daniel Mangrané in 1951 and Hans-Jürgen Syberberg in 1982. There is also a 1998 documentary directed by Tony Palmer titled: Parsifal – The Search for the Grail. It was recorded in various European theaters, including the Mariinsky Theatre, the Ravello Festival in Siena, and the Bayreuth Festival. It contains extracts from Palmer's stage production of Parsifal starring Plácido Domingo, Violeta Urmana, Matti Salminen, and Nikolai Putilin. In also includes interviews with Domingo, Wolfgang Wagner, writers Robert Gutman and Karen Armstrong. The film exists in two versions: (1) a complete version running 116 minutes and officially approved by Domingo, and (2) an 88-minute version, with cuts of passages regarded by the German distributor as being too "political", "uncomfortable", and "irrelevant".

== See also ==
- Gesamtkunstwerk
