= Johann Just Winckelmann =

German writer and historian

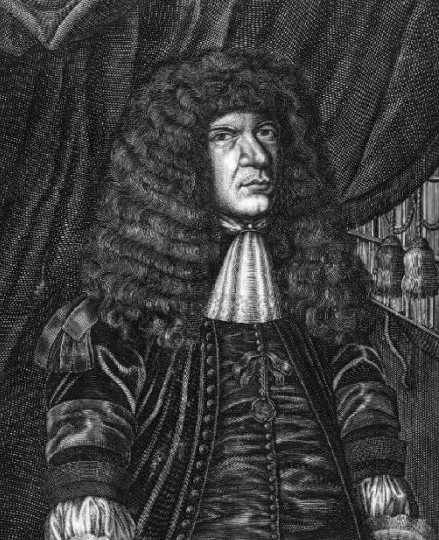
- Born: 19 August 1620; Gießen, Hessen-Darmstadt
- Died: 3 July 1699 (aged 78); Free imperial city of Bremen
- Occupations: Chronicler; Historian; Mnemonist
- Parent(s): Johannes Winckelmann; Barbara Stumpf / Winckelmann

Johann Just Winckelmann, also Johann Justus Winckelmann (19 August 1620 – 3 July 1699) was a German writer, historian and mnemonist.

Under his pseudonym Stanislaus Mink von Weunßhein (also Wenusheim, Winusheim) he is known for having introduced a mnemonic system, the Major System (also called phonetic system or phonetic mnemonic system), used for memorizing numbers.

== Life ==
Johann Just Winckelmann was born in Gießen in 1620, the youngest of the known sons of the theologian Johannes Winckelmann. His mother was his father's fourth wife, and by the time of his birth his father was nearly 70. After his father died, in 1626, his mother sent him away to live with relatives near Butzbach, where he was provided with a classical schooling. He was moved in 1633 to Marburg: here he attended the Pädagogium (school) and then moved on to the University. His studies embraced Theology, Philosophy, Jurisprudence and Historical method. He also attended the lectures of Johann Balthasar Schupp who had a reputation as a writer of satire and religious works. Winckelmann received his Magister degree in 1639 and went on to undertake further study at the Herborn Academy. A period of travel followed, focusing on Holland, before he returned to his homeland.

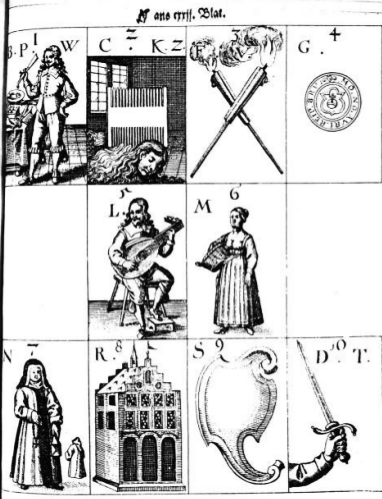
Johann Just Winckelmann - mnemonic major system from 1648

He now entered into the service of George II, Landgrave of Hesse-Darmstadt, taking part in the storming of Butzbach on 20 April 1646. It would be another two years before the destructive warfare finally ended, but in the meantime Wincklemann's own priorities turned back to scholarship, and he made a proposal to the Landgrave that he should prepare a comprehensive history of the Hesse-Darmstadt Landgraviate. The proposal was accepted: Winckelmann was appointed the Landgrave's official historiographer and given access to all the relevant archives and registries. He set to work with energy, acquiring a number of manuscript chronicles, procuring copies of important documents, copying inscriptions and travelling extensively, because he was also keen to be able to include descriptions of the land and its people, and to observe for himself the towns and fortresses, antiquities and monuments, mines and manufacturing operations.

Winkelmann gave an illustration with ten images to help memorize the code.
Number	Image	Code
1	Barbierer (Barber, B).	B, P, W
2	Kamm (Comb, K).	C, K, Q, Z
3	Fakkel (Torch, F).	F, V
4	Golt-Gülden (Gold coin, G).	G
5	Lautte (Lute, L).	L
6	Mägdlein (Maiden, M).	M
7	Nonne (Nun, N).	N
8	Rahthauß (City hall, R).	R
9	Schild (Shield, S).	S
0	Degen (Dagger, D).	D, T

It is not clear what plans may have existed to have Winckelmann's historical work on Hesse-Darmstadt printed and published, but in 1653 none of it had been printed and Winckelmann moved to the court of Anthony Günther, Count of Oldenburg. His work continued to be literature and history based. A work he completed at his new patron's instigation was "Oldenburgische Friedens- und der benachbarten Oerter Kriegshandlungen". He also continued to work on his still unpublished chronicle of Hessen. The first four of the eight volumes which, at this stage, he envisaged for the complete work were submitted to the Commission responsible for checking and censorship between 1654 and 1657 in both Hessen-Darmstadt. However, for a range of emerging political considerations it became apparent that permission to have these volumes printed would not be granted any time soon. Winckelmann took the opportunity of his patron's death in 1667 to move away in order to arrange for the publication of the work for himself, ending up in Bremen. Eventually, in 1697, he partially succeeded when the first five volumes were printed and published. By this time, however, interest had cooled in the more socio-economic aspects of the works, covering matters such as agriculture, land use and manufacturing, and many of the maps and drawings that he had gathered went unused. Nevertheless, by the time he died, in deep poverty, on 3 July 1699, a sixth volume incorporating some of these elements had been prepared and was ready for printing.
