= Jonathan Harvey (composer) =

British composer (1939–2012)

Jonathan Dean Harvey (3 May 1939 – 4 December 2012) was a British composer. He held teaching positions at universities and music conservatories in Europe and the United States.

== Life ==
Harvey was born in Sutton Coldfield, and studied at St John's College, Cambridge, eventually obtaining a PhD. He also took private lessons with Erwin Stein and Hans Keller on the advice of Benjamin Britten. In 1969, he took up a Harkness Fellowship at Princeton University. In the 1980s, Harvey produced music at IRCAM after receiving an invitation from Pierre Boulez to work there.. He was professor of music at Sussex University from 1977 to 1993

At IRCAM, Harvey produced works such as Speakings, a composition for large orchestra and electronics, in collaboration with sound artist and composer Gilbert Nouno and researchers Arshia Cont and Grégoire Carpentier. The concept of the piece was to "make an orchestra speak". IRCAM is known for speech analysis and in this piece, special technology was developed to allow the analysis of speech to be realized in an orchestral context, using complex algorithms which can process multiple combinations possible in an orchestra setting. The program Orchidée computed such analyses and provided orchestrations for the composer.

From 2005 to 2008, Harvey held the post of Composer in Association with the BBC Scottish Symphony Orchestra.

In 2009, he was Composer in Residence at the Huddersfield Contemporary Music Festival. He died, aged 73, in Lewes, from motor neuron disease.

Speakings received six votes in a 2017 Classic Voice poll of the greatest works of art music since 2000. In 2019, writers for The Guardian ranked Harvey's String Quartet No. 4 the eighth greatest work of classical music in the same period.

== Writings ==
- 1975. The Music of Stockhausen: An Introduction. Berkeley and Los Angeles: University of California Press. ISBN 0-520-02311-0.
- 1976. "Inner Light (3)". The Musical Times 117, no. 1596 (February): 125–127.
- 1981. Ferneyhough. London: Edition Peters. (on Brian Ferneyhough)
- 1983. "New Directions: A Manifesto". Soundings: A Music Journal 11 (Winter): 2–13.
- 1999a. Music and Inspiration, edited by Michael Downes. London and New York: Faber and Faber. ISBN 0-571-20025-7.
- 1999b. In Quest of Spirit: Thoughts on Music. The Bloch Lectures. With compact disc sound recording. Berkeley and Los Angeles: University of California Press. ISBN 0-520-21392-0. French edition, as Pensées sur la musique: la quête de l'esprit, translated by Mireille Tansman Zanuttini in collaboration with and with an introduction by Danielle Cohen-Levinas. Paris: L'Harmattan, 2007. ISBN 2-296-03753-4. Spanish edition, as Música e inspiración, translated by Carme Castells. Barcelona: Global Rhythm Press, 2008; ISBN 978-84-96879-31-7.
- 2007, with Jean-Claude Carrière. Circles of Silence. The Cahiers Series no. 3. [Paris]: Center for Writers & Translators, The Arts Arena, American University of Paris; Lewes [England]: Sylph Editions. ISBN 0-9552963-3-1. (on the opera Wagner Dream)

== Selected works ==
- Dialogue and Song for cello and piano (1965/1977)
- Four Images after Yeats for piano (1969)
- Piano Trio (1971)
- I love the Lord, motet (1976)
- String Quartet No. 1 (1977)
- Cantata: IV: Ludus amoris: for speaker, soprano & tenor soli, SATB, and orchestra (1977), OCLC 4183489
- O Jesu Nomen Dulce for choir (1979)
- Mortuos Plango, Vivos Voco, computer-manipulated concrete sounds (pre-recorded octophonic tape), for tape (1980)
- Mythic Figures (1980)
- Bhakti for 15 players and quadrophonic tape (1982)
- Curve with Plateaux for solo cello (1982)
- Flight-Elegy for violin and piano (1983–89)
- Nataraja for flute, piccolo and piano (1983)
- Nachtlied for soprano, piano and tape (1984)
- Come Holy Ghost for choir (1984)
- Ricercare una Melodia for solo trumpet/cello/flute/oboe/trombone with tape delay system (1984)
- Song Offerings for soprano and chamber ensemble of 8 players (1985)
- Forms of Emptiness for choir (1986)
- God is our Refuge for choir and organ (1986)
- Madonna of Winter and Spring for orchestra, synthesizer and electronics (1986)
- Lauds for choir and solo cello (1987)
- From Silence for soprano, 6 players and tape (1988)
- String Quartet No. 2 (1988)
- Three Sketches for solo cello (1989)
- Ritual Melodies for quadrophonic tape (1989–90)
- Cello Concerto (1990)
- Fantasia for organ (1991)
- Serenade in Homage to Mozart for wind ensemble of 10 players (1991)
- Scena for violin and chamber ensemble of 9 players (1992)
- Lotuses for flute quartet (1992)
- You (1992)
- Chant for solo cello (or solo viola) (1992–94)
- The Riot for flute, piccolo, bass clarinet and piano (1993)
- One Evening... for soprano, mezzo, soprano, chamber ensemble of 8 players, 2 technicians and electronics (1993–94)
- The Angels for choir (1994)
- Tombeau de Messiaen for piano and tape (1994)
- Advaya for cello, electronic keyboard and electronics (1994)
- Dum Transisset Sabbatum for choir (1995)
- String Quartet No. 3 (1995)
- Percussion Concerto (1997)
- Sufi Dance for solo guitar (1997)
- Wheel of Emptiness for chamber ensemble of 16 players (1997)
- Ashes Dance Back for choir and electronics (1997)
- Death of Light/Light of Death for chamber ensemble of 5 players after Grunewald's Crucifixion in the Isenheim Altarpiece (1998)
- Tranquil Abiding for chamber orchestra (1998)
- Valley of Aosta for 13 players and electronics (1998)
- Marahi for unaccompanied choir (1999)
- The Summer Cloud's Awakening for choir, flute, cello and electronics (2001)
- Vers for piano (2000)
- Jubilus for viola and chamber ensemble (2003)
- String Quartet No. 4 with live electronics (2003)
- String Trio (2004)
- Body Mandala for orchestra (2006)
- Wagner Dream, opera (2007)
- Speakings for orchestra and electronics (2008)
- Other Presences for trumpet and electronics (2008)
- Imaginings for cello and live electronics
- Philia's Dream for cello and synthesizer
- 80 Breaths for Tokyo for orchestra (2010)
- Weltethos, an oratorio, for speaker, choir, children's chorus and orchestra (2011), commissioned by the Berlin Philharmonic
- Cirrus Light for clarinet (2012) 9min
