= Charles A. Asbury =

American banjo player and recording artist

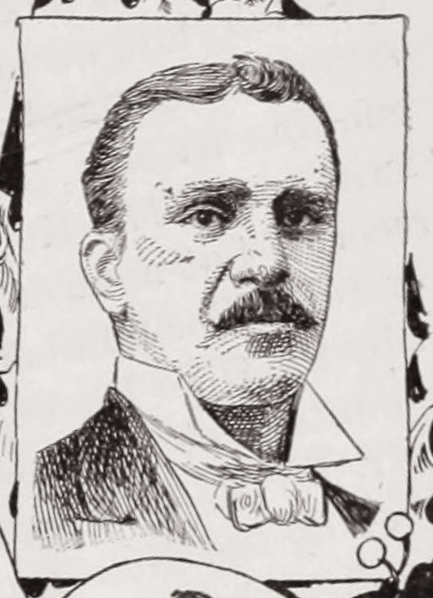

Background information
- Born: Charles Adam Alvarez; 1856 or 1857; Florida, U.S.
- Died: May 26, 1903 New York, N.Y.
- Occupation: Musician
- Years active: 1876–1897
- Labels: New Jersey Phonograph Company, United States Phonograph Company, Columbia Phonograph Company

Charles Adam Asbury (1856 or 1857 – May 26, 1903) was an American banjo player and pioneer recording artist active from 1876 to 1897. On the stage, he played parts that emphasized his multiracial ancestry, and his recording work was largely in the minstrel tradition. His surviving recordings are the earliest (and some of the only contemporary) examples of the stroke style of banjo.

== Biography ==
Asbury was probably born Charles Adam Alvarez to Spanish immigrants in Florida in late 1856 or early 1857, and was raised by Emanuel and Mary Asbury in Augusta, Georgia. In February 1876, Asbury appeared as Sambo in an all-black production of Uncle Tom's Cabin along with his wife Louisa Scott (as Emeline). In 1886, Asbury sung as a member of the Unique Quartette and in 1887 played banjo with the Georgia Jubilee Singers.

In 1891, he began recording for the New Jersey Phonograph Company, and continued recording for the United States Phonograph Company after the bankruptcy of the North American Phonograph Company. His repertoire consisted of minstrel songs such as "I'se Gwine Back to Dixie" and "De Gospel Raft". Although the United States Phonograph Company distributed nationally, the primitive duplicating technology in use at the time required artists to record frequently, so Asbury performed locally, with the Magnolia Quartette and Virginia Troubadours. In early 1897, Asbury recorded for the Columbia Phonograph Company, which had moved its headquarters from Washington, D.C. to New York City. In 1900, Asbury moved with his second wife, Mary Jane Jones, to Brooklyn, N.Y., and on May 26, 1903, Charles Asbury died of pneumonia in Bellevue Hospital.

== Repertoire ==
- The Gospel Raft (1878)
- Chop Down Wid a Golden Axe
- Cake Walk
- Mary's Gone Wid a Coon (1880)
- The Coon That Got the Shake
- Black Pickaninny
- The Court House in the Sky
- New Coon in Town (1883)
- I'se Gwine Back to Dixie (1874)
- The Colored Band
- Coon that Carried a Razor (1885)
- Lock on the Chicken Coop Door (1885)
- I'm the Father of a Little Black Coon (1887)
- Haul the Woodpile Down (1887)

== Surviving recordings ==
Recordings of Charles A. Asbury have been mostly unavailable since their original publication, not having been reissued on LP or CD until recently. In April 2003, "Black Pickaninny", (United States P.C., ≈1895) was broadcast on the "Antique Phonograph Music Program", attributed to "Carl J. Asbury". In December 2010, the UC Santa Barbara Cylinder Audio Archive released one of Asbury's recordings — "Haul the Woodpile Down" — as part of a playlist of "Recorded Incunabula". In May 2018, Archeophone Records published Charles A. Asbury: 4 Banjo Songs, 1891–1897, presenting three more of Asbury's recordings with a booklet of biographical notes. One additional example, "The Courthouse in the Sky" (Columbia 8310) is held by the Belfer Audio Archive at Syracuse University.

== See also ==
- Len Spencer
- Silas Leachman
- Billy Golden
