= 1896 in music =

Events in the year 1896 in music.

== Specific locations ==
- 1896 in Norwegian music

== Events ==
- January 4 – The Czech Philharmonic Orchestra plays its first concert under this name, when Dvořák conducts his own compositions in Prague (Austro-Hungarian Empire).
- March 18 – Danish composer Carl Nielsen conducts a performance of his First Symphony in Dresden; the event marks the beginning of his international success.
- March 19 – Dvořák's Cello Concerto is premiered, with Leo Stern as soloist, at the Queen's Hall in London.
- April 13 – Jean Sibelius conducts the world premiere of his Lemminkäinen Suite in Helsinki.
- December 27 – Formal premiere of Ernest Chausson's Poème for violin and orchestra, Op. 25, with Eugène Ysaÿe as soloist, at Nancy, France.
- Engelbert Humperdinck is created a professor of music by the Kaiser.
- Gabriel Fauré takes over from Théodore Dubois as organist of the church of La Madeleine, Paris.
- In Moscow, Mariya Kerzina and her husband Arkadiy Kerzin form the Circle of Russian Music Lovers, a performance society.

== Published popular music ==
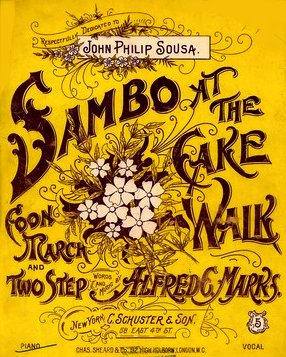
Sambo at the Cakewalk, sheet music cover

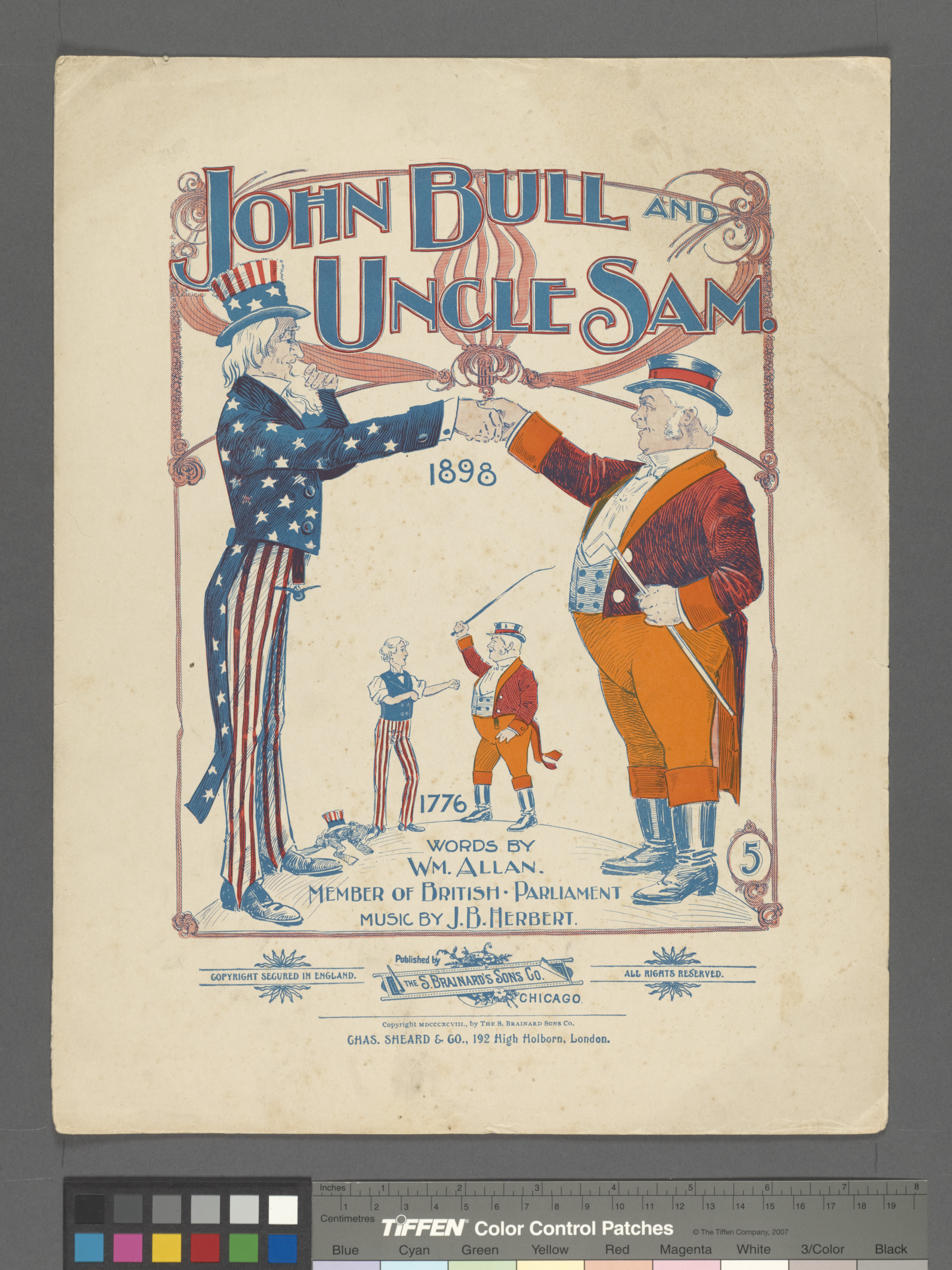
John Bull and Uncle Sam (words by Wm. Allan; music by J.B. Herbert)

- "All Coons Look Alike to Me" w.m. Ernest Hogan
- "Årstiderna" w.m. Alice Tegnér
- "The Amorous Goldfish" w. Harry Greenbank m. Sidney Jones
- "Chin, Chin, Chinaman" w. Harry Greenbank m. Sidney Jones
- "El Capitan March" m. John Philip Sousa
- "Eli Green's Cakewalk" w.m. David Reed & Sadie Koninsky
- "Elsie From Chelsea" w.m. Harry Dacre
- "Going For A Pardon" w. James Thornton & Clara Havenschild m. James Thornton
- "Happy Days In Dixie" m. Kerry Mills
- "Hot Tamale Alley" by George M. Cohan
- "A Hot Time In The Old Town" w. Joseph Hayden m. Theodore A. Metz
- "I Love You In The Same Old Way – Darling Sue" w. Walter H. Ford m. John Walter Bratton
- "In The Baggage Coach Ahead" w.m. Gussie L. Davis
- "A Jovial Monk Am I" w. (Eng) Arthur Sturgess m. Edmond Audran
- "Kentucky Babe" w. Richard Henry Buck m. Adam Geibel
- "Laugh And The World Laughs With You" w. Ella Wheeler Wilcox m. Louis Gottschalk
- "Love Makes The World Go 'Round" w. Clyde Fitch m. arr. William Furst
- "Mister Johnson, Turn Me Loose" w.m. Ben Harney
- "Mother Was A Lady" w. Edward B. Marks m. Joseph W. Stern
- "Musetta's Waltz Song" m. Giacomo Puccini
- "My Gal Is A High Born Lady" w.m. Barney Fagan arr. Gustave Luders
- "Remus Takes the Cake" by J. H. Ellis
- "The Saint Louis Cyclone" by Ren Shields & George Evans
- "Sambo at the Cakewalk" by Alfred E. Marks
- "Stars & Stripes Forever" by John Philip Sousa
- "Sweet Rosie O'Grady" w.m. Maude Nugent
- "To A Wild Rose" m. Edward MacDowell
- "Warmest Baby in the Bunch" by George M. Cohan
- "When the Saints Are Marching In" w. Katharine E. Purvis m. James M. Black
- "You've Been a Good Old Wagon but You Done Broke Down" w.m. Ben Harney

== Recorded popular music ==
- "A Hot Time In The Old Town"
  – Dan W. Quinn on Edison Records
- "A Hot Time On The Levee"
  – Len Spencer & Vess Ossman on Columbia Records
- "All Coons Look Alike to Me" (w.m. Ernest Hogan)
  – Dan W. Quinn on Edison Records
  – George J. Gaskin on Berliner
  – Len Spencer on Columbia
- "The Amorous Goldfish" (w. Harry Greenbank m. Sidney Jones)
  – Dan W. Quinn on Edison Records
- "Anchored"
  – J.W. Myers on Berliner
- "And Her Golden Hair Was Hanging Down Her Back" (w. Monroe H. Rosenfeld m. Felix McGlennon)
  – Maud Foster on Berliner Records
- "Annie Laurie" (w. William Douglas m. Lady John Douglas Scott)
  – George J. Gaskin on Edison
  – Edison Male Quartette on Edison
- "The Anvil Chorus"
  – Banta's Popular Orchestra
- "A Summer Evening"
  – Baldwin's Cadet Band of Boston
- "Beautiful Star"
  – Mozart Quartette
- "The Belle of Avenoo A" (w.m. Safford Waters)
  – Dan W. Quinn on Berliner
- "The Belle of New York March"
  – United States Marine Band
- "Ben Bolt" (w. Thomas Dunn English m. Nelson Kneass)
  – George J. Gaskin on Berliner
- "The Blue Danube" (m. Johann Strauss)
  – Edison Grand Concert Band on Edison
- "Chin, Chin, Chinaman" (w. Harry Greenbank m. Sidney Jones)
  – Dan W. Quinn on Edison
- "Commodore Polka"
  – W. Paris Chambers on Berliner
- "Darkies BBQ"
  – Vess Ossman on Columbia
- "The Darkies Temptation"
  – John Philip Sousa on Edison
- "Dear Kind Doctor"
  – Russell Hunting
- "La Donna è Mobile" (w. Francesco Piave m. Giuseppe Verdi)
  – Ferruccio Giannini on Berliner
- "Don't You Hear Dem Bells?" (w.m. D. S. McCosh)
  – Brilliant Quartet on Berliner
- "Down in Poverty Row" (w. Gussie L. Davis m. Arthur Trevelyan)
  – Dan W. Quinn on Berliner
  – George J. Gaskin on Edison
- "Elsie from Chelsea" (w.m. Harry Dacre)
  – Dan W. Quinn on Edison
- "Flower Song"
  – Maud Foster on Berliner
- "Funiculì, Funiculà" (w. G. Turco m. Luigi Denza)
  – Ferruccio Giannini on Berliner
- "The Future Mrs 'Awkins" (w.m. Albert Chevalier)
  – George J. Gaskin on Berliner
- "The Girl I Left Behind"
  – George J. Gaskin on Berliner
- "The Gladiators" (m. John Philip Sousa)
  – Edison Grand Concert Band on Edison
- "Hallelujah Chorus" (w. Charles Jennes m. George Frideric Handel)
  – Edison Grand Concert Band on Edison
- "Henrietta, Have You Met Her?"
  – George J. Gaskin on Berliner
- "Her Name is Jane"
  – George J. Gaskin on Berliner
- "The Holy City" (w. Frederick Edward Weatherly m. Stephen Adams)
  – Ferruccio Giannini on Berliner
- "Home Sweet Home" (w. John Howard Payne m. Sir Henry Rowley Bishop)
  – George J. Gaskin on Edison
- "The Honeymoon" (m. George Rosey)
  – Edison Grand Concert Band on Edison
- "I Don't Want to Play in Your Yard" (w. Philip Wingate m. Henry W. Petrie)
  – Maud Foster on Berliner
- "In the Baggage Coach Ahead" (w.m. Gussie L. Davis)
  – George J. Gaskin on Edison
  – Dan W. Quinn
- "Isabelle"
  – Maud Foster on Berliner
- "I'se Gwine Back to Dixie" (w.m. C. A. White)
  – Brilliant Quartet on Berliner
  – George J. Gaskin on Berliner
- "I've Been Hoodoed"
  – Dan W. Quinn on Berliner
- "I Want Yer, Ma Honey - The Widow Jones"
  – Dan W. Quinn
- "I Wonder Why?"
  – Russell Hunting
- "Just One Girl"
  – William F. Denny
- "Just Say Goodbye Again"
  – George J. Gaskin
- "Just Tell Them That You Saw Me" (w.m. Paul Dresser)
  – George J. Gaskin on Berliner
  – Dan W. Quinn on Berliner
- "Kathleen" (w.m. Helene Mora)
  – George J. Gaskin on Edison
- "Kathleen Mavourneen" (w. Annie Crawford (Barry) m. Frederick William Nichols Crouch)
  – George J. Gaskin on Berliner
- "Kentucky Jubilee Singers"
  – Issler's Orchestra
- "King Cotton March" (m. John Philip Sousa)
  – Edison Grand Concert Band on Edison
- "La Paloma" (w. anon m. Sebastian Yradier)
  – Ferruccio Giannini on Berliner*"The Anvil Chorus"
  – Banta's Popular Orchestra
- "Leonore"
  – George J. Gaskin on Berliner
- "Listen to the Mocking Bird" (w. Alice Hawthorne m. Richard Milburn)
  – whistling Billy Golden on Edison
- "The Lost Chord" (w. Adelaide Anne Procter m. Sir Arthur Sullivan)
  – Edison Grand Concert Band on Edison
- "Love's Old Sweet Song"
  – George J. Gaskin
- "March from Carmen"
  – Issler's Orchestra
- "Marching Through Georgia" (w.m. Henry Clay Work)
  – George J. Gaskin on Berliner
  – J.W. Myers on Berliner
- "La Marseillaise" (w.m. Claude Joseph Rouget de Lisle)
  – Ferruccio Giannini on Berliner
- "Massa's In De Cold Cold Ground"
  – George J. Gaskin on Berliner
- "McKinley Is Our Man"
  – Dan W. Quinn on U.S. Phonograph Records
- "Moonlight On The Lake"
  – Mozart Quartette
- "My Angeline" (w. Harry B. Smith m. Victor Herbert)
  – Frank Daniels on Berliner
- "My Best Girl's a New Yorker" (w.m. John Stromberg)
  – Dan W. Quinn on Berliner
- "My Gal Is a High Born Lady" (w.m. Barney Fagan arr. Gustave Luders)
  – George J. Gaskin on Edison
  – Dan W. Quinn on Berliner
- "My Pearl Is A Bowery Girl" (w. William Jerome m. Andrew Mack)
  – George J. Gaskin on Berliner
- "Nearer, My God, To Thee" (w. Sarah F. Adams m. Lowell Mason)
  – J. W. Myers on Berliner
  – Len Spencer & Roger Harding on Columbia
- "The New Bully"
  – Dan W. Quinn on Berliner
  – J.W. Myers on Berliner
- "Oh! Uncle John"
  – George J. Gaskin on Berliner
- "Old Folks At Home"
  – George J. Gaskin on Berliner
- "On The Mill Dam"
  – Stephen B. Clements on Berliner
- "Onward, Christian Soldiers" (w. Rev. Sabine Baring-Gould m. Sir Arthur Sullivan)
  – J. W. Myers on Berliner
- "The Palms" (Jean-Baptiste Faure)
  – Ferruccio Giannini on Berliner
- "Princess Bonnie Waltzes"
  – Fred Gaisberg on Berliner
- "Private Tommy Atkins" (w. Henry Hamilton m. S. Potter)
  – George J. Gaskin on Berliner
- "Put Me Off at Buffalo" (Dillon Brothers, w. Harry Dillon m. John Dillon)
  – Dan W. Quinn on Berliner
- "Remember Poor Mother At Home"
  – Brilliant Quartet on Berliner
- "Rock of Ages" (w. Augustus Montague Toplady m. Thomas Hasting)
  – J. W. Myers on Berliner
- "Roll on De Ground"
  – Billy Golden on Berliner
- "'Round His Bed I'm Goin' to Creep" ()
  – Len Spencer on Columbia
- "Sally in Our Alley" (w. Henry Carey m. trad)
  – George J. Gaskin on Berliner
- "She Is More to Be Pitied Than Censured" (w.m. William B. Gray)
  – Steve Porter on Columbia
- "She May Have Seen Better Days" (w.m. James Thornton)
  – Dan W. Quinn on Berliner
  – George J. Gaskin on Berliner
- "Star Light, Star Bright"
  – J.W. Myers on Berliner
- "Rastus On Parade"
  – Stephen B. Clements on Berliner
- "The Sunshine of Paradise Alley" (w. Walter H. Ford m. John Walter Bratton)
  – George J. Gaskin on Berliner
- "Tenting on the Old Camp Ground" (w.m. Walter Kittredge)
  – George J. Gaskin on Berliner
- "Then You'll Remember Me" (w. Alfred Bunn m. Michael William Balfe)
  – Ferruccio Giannini on Berliner
- "There's Only One Girl in the World for Me" (w.m. Dave Marion)
  – J. W. Myers on Berliner
- "They Are the Best Friends of All"
  – Helene Mora on US Phonograph Records
- "The Thunderer"
  – United States Marine Band
- "Toreador Song" (w. Henri Meilhac, Ludovic Halévy m. Georges Bizet)
  – J. W. Myers on Berliner
- "Tramp, Tramp, Tramp" (w.m. George Frederick Root)
  – George J. Gaskin on Berliner
- "Trilby Song"
  – Maurice Farkoa with piano Frank Lambert on Berliner
- "Uncle Harry, What is Love"
  – William F. Denny
- "The Virginia Skedaddle"
  – Columbia Orchestra on Columbia
- "Watchman Tell Us of the Night" (Bowring, Mason)
  – J. W. Myers on Berliner
- "'Way Down Yonder in the Cornfield"
  – Columbia Quartette on Columbia
  – Mozart Quartette on Berliner
- "When Johnny Comes Marching Home" (w.m. Louis Lambert)
  – George J. Gaskin on Berliner
- "Where Is My Wandering Boy, Tonight?" (w.m. Rev. R. Lowry)
  – J. W. Myers on Berliner
- "Wot Cher!" (w. Albert Chevalier m. Charles Ingle)
  – George J. Gaskin on Berliner
- "The Wreck of The Maine"
  – George J. Gaskin

== Classical music ==
- Eyvind Alnæs – Symphony No. 1
- Amy Beach
  - Symphony in E minor "Gaelic"
  - Violin Sonata
- Johannes Brahms
  - Vier ernste Gesänge
  - Eleven Chorale Preludes for organ
- Anton Bruckner – Symphony No. 9 (finished three movements, sketches of finale)
- Ernest Chausson – Poème for violin and orchestra
- Cornelis Dopper – Symphony No. 1
- Antonín Dvořák
  - The Water Goblin
  - The Noon-Day Witch (and two other "Erben tone-poems", given their premiere later in the year in London)
  - Quartet in A-flat major Op. 105
  - The Wild Dove, Op.110
- Louis Ganne – Extase
- Gustav Holst – Quintet for piano and winds
- Vincent d'Indy – Istar
- Charles Ives – String Quartet no. 1, From the Salvation Army
- Edward MacDowell – Woodland Sketches
- Albéric Magnard – Symphony No. 3 Opus 11 (1895–96)
- Gustav Mahler – Symphony No. 3 completed
- Hans Pfitzner – Piano Trio in F Opus 8
- Sergei Rachmaninoff – Symphony No. 1 (1895–96)
- Maurice Ravel
  - "D'Anne jouant de l'espinette"
  - La parade
  - "Sainte"
- Camille Saint-Saëns
  - Piano Concerto No. 5 ("Egyptian")
  - Violin Sonata No. 2
- Alexander Scriabin
  - 24 Preludes for Piano, Op. 11
  - 5 Preludes for Piano, Op. 15
  - Piano Concerto in F-sharp minor, Op. 20
- Jean Sibelius – Coronation Cantata
- Richard Strauss – Also sprach Zarathustra
- George Templeton Strong – 4 Poems, Op.36
- Francisco Tárrega – Recuerdos de la Alhambra
- Alexander von Zemlinsky
  - String Quartet No. 1
  - Trio for Clarinet, Cello and Piano

== Opera ==
- Reginald De Koven – The Mandarin
- August Enna – Aucassin og Nicolette
- Zdeněk Fibich – Hedy, premiered February 12 in Prague
- Gialdino Gialdini – La Pupilla premiered October 23 at the Societá Filarmonica Drammatica, Trieste
- Umberto Giordano – Andrea Chénier
- Paul Juon – Aleko
- Ruggiero Leoncavallo – Chatterton
- Friedrich Lux – The Duchess of Athens
- Giacomo Puccini – La Bohème, Teatro Regio in Turin.
- Nikolai Rimsky-Korsakov – Sadko
- Charles Villiers Stanford – Shamus O'Brien (revised 1907)
- Hugo Wolf – Der Corregidor

== Musical theater ==
- The Art Of Maryland Broadway production
- El Capitan Broadway production
- The Circus Girl London production
- The Gay Parisienne London production
- The Geisha London production
- The Geisha Broadway production
- The Girl From Paris London production
- The Grand Duke London production

== Births ==
- January 20 – Elmer Diktonius, poet and composer (d. 1961)
- January 25 – Florence Mills, cabaret and jazz performer (d. 1927)
- January 28 – Elsie Carlisle, English singer (d. 1977)
- February 3 – Kid Thomas Valentine, jazz trumpeter (d. 1987)
- February 9 – Steffy Goldner, harpist (d. 1962)
- February 22 – Nacio Herb Brown, US songwriter (d. 1964)
- March 1 – Dimitris Mitropoulos, pianist, conductor and composer (d. 1960)
- April 10 – Edith Day, US actress, singer and dancer (d. 1971)
- April 30 – Reverend Gary Davis, blues and gospel singer and instrumentalist (d. 1972)
- June 1 – Sydney Kyte, British bandleader and violinist (d. 1981)
- June 20 – Wilfrid Pelletier, Canadian conductor (d. 1982)
- July 5 – Serge Walter, Russian-born American composer and songwriter (d. 1976)
- July 10
  - Stefan Askenase, Polish-Belgian classical pianist and pedagogue (d. 1985)
  - Maurice Zbriger, Ukrainian-born Canadian violinist, composer and conductor (d. 1981)
- August 2 – Lorenzo Herrera, singer and composer (d. 1960)
- August 15 – Léon Theremin, Russian inventor of the musical instrument named after him (d. 1993)
- September 2 – Amanda Randolph, actress and singer (d. 1967)
- September 8 – Howard Dietz, lyricist (d. 1983)
- September 10 – Adele Astaire, US dancer and singer (d. 1981)
- September 15 – Bert Ambrose, English bandleader and violinist (d. 1971)
- September 25 – Roberto Gerhard, composer (d. 1970)
- October 7 – Phil Ohman, US bandleader (d. 1954)
- October 17 – Fernando Obradors, composer (d. 1945)
- October 18 – Friedrich Hollaender, composer (d. 1976)
- October 28 – Howard Hanson, composer (d. 1981)
- October 31 – Ethel Waters, singer (d. 1977)
- November 23 – Ruth Etting, US singer (d. 1978)
- November 25 – Virgil Thomson, composer and critic (d. 1989)
- December 6 – Ira Gershwin, lyricist (d. 1983)
- December 12 – Jenö Ádám, conductor, composer and music teacher (d. 1982)
- December 21 – Leroy Robertson, composer and music teacher (d. 1971)
- December 28 – Roger Sessions, composer (d. 1985)

== Deaths ==
- January 28 – Sir Joseph Barnby, conductor and composer (b. 1838)
- February 5 – Henry David Leslie, conductor and composer (b. 1822)
- February 6 – Juliette Dorus-Gras, operatic soprano (born 1896)
- February 12 – Ambroise Thomas, composer (b. 1811)
- February 13 – Carl Martin Reinthaler, organist, conductor and composer (b. 1822)
- March 5 – Hiromori Hayashi, composer (b. 1831)
- April 12 – Alexander Ritter, composer and violinist (b. 1833)
- May 12 – Juan Morel Campos, danza composer (b. 1857)
- May 20 – Clara Schumann, Austrian composer (b. 1819)
- June 7 – Pavlos Carrer, composer (b. 1829)
- June 22 – Sir Augustus Harris, librettist and impresario (b. 1852)
- June 28 – Jenny Hill, music hall performer (b. 1848; tuberculosis)
- July 14 – Luther Whiting Mason, music educator (b. 1818)
- July 17 – Alfred Novello, music publisher (b. 1810)
- July 26 – Théodore Salomé, organist and composer (b. 1834)
- August 1 – Wilhelm Herman Barth, violinist, composer and music theorist (b. 1813)
- August 18 – Frederick Crouch, cellist and composer (b. 1808)
- September 16 – Antônio Carlos Gomes, composer (b. 1836)
- September 22 – Katharina Klafsky, Wagnerian soprano (b. 1855)
- September 23 – Gilbert Duprez, operatic tenor (b. 1806)
- October 11 – Anton Bruckner, Austrian composer (b. 1824)
- October 17 – Henry Eugene Abbey, theatre manager (b. 1846)
- November 25 – Spyridon Xyndas, composer (b. 1812)
- December 3 – László Erkel, Hungarian composer, son of Ferenc Erkel
- December 13 – Wilhelm Joseph von Wasielewski, musicologist, conductor, and composer (b. 1822)
- December 17 – Richard Pohl, writer, critic and composer (b. 1826)
- December 24 – Anders Ljungqvist, fiddler (b. 1815)
- date unknown
  - Luigia Abbadia, operatic mezzo-soprano (b. 1821)
  - Gopalakrishna Bharati, poet and Carnatic music composer (b. 1810)

== See also ==
- List of musical events
