= Chicago Talking Machine Company =

American phonograph company

The Chicago Talking Machine Company (sometimes The Talking Machine Company of Chicago, or simply The Talking Machine Company) was a manufacturer and dealer of phonographs, phonograph accessories, and phonograph records from 1893 until 1906, and a major wholesaler of Victor Talking Machine Company products between 1906 and at least 1928.

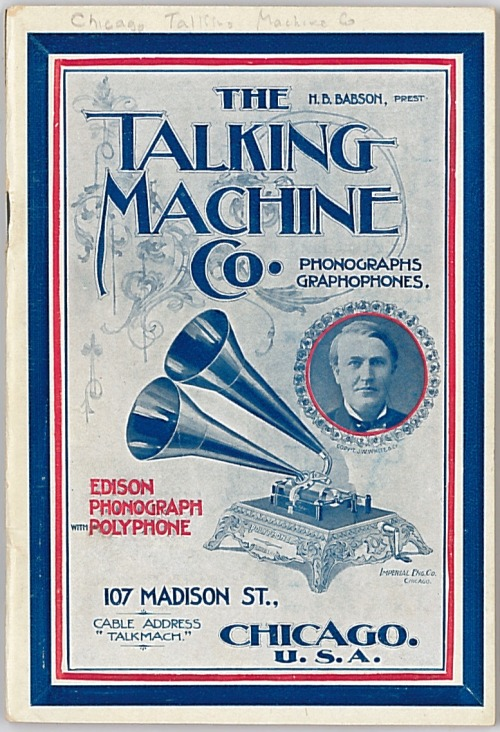
Chicago Talking Machine Co. Catalog, c. 1898

The company was founded in 1893 by Leon Douglass and Henry Babson, with financing from Charles Dickinson. It first sold phonographs and supplies manufactured by the Edison Phonograph Works, but soon began manufacturing their own cylinder records and marketing a spring motor designed by Edward H. Amet. After the collapse of the North American Phonograph Company in 1894, the company became a major independent distributor of phonograph records made by the Columbia Phonograph Company, the United States Phonograph Company, and Edison's National Phonograph Company, in addition to those of their own manufacture. Silas Leachman, a Chicago-based recording pioneer who specialized in coon songs, was their most popular artist. By the first issue of the trade magazine Phonoscope in November 1896, the company was in a prominent enough position in the industry to buy the first full-page advertisement of the issue.

In 1898, Leon Douglass, who had previously invented a coin-operation mechanism and phonograph record duplication process, invented the "Polyphone", which added a second horn and reproducer to the phonograph or graphophone to increase its loudness (and, supposedly, its fidelity). He formed The Polyphone Company at the same address as The Talking Machine Company (having dropped the "Chicago" prefix) to market the device and would focus on this aspect of the business until joining Eldridge Johnson in 1900 to begin working on what would become the Victor Talking Machine Company.

From 1903 until 1905, Henry Babson would manage the operation with his brothers Fred and Gus, and develop a mail-order operation and a national distribution network. In 1906, the company was purchased by Arthur D. Geissler, son of the general manager of the Victor Talking Machine Company and reconfigured to wholesale Victor products, while the Babson Brothers formed a new company to sell and distribute Edison products.

== See also ==
- United States Phonograph Company
- Walcutt and Leeds
