= Walcutt and Leeds =

Walcutt and Leeds was a manufacturer and dealer of cylinder records and supplies in the 1890s. It was formed in February 1896 by Cleveland Walcutt and Edward F. Leeds at 53 E. 11th St. in New York City. Walcutt and Leeds had previously been partners in the firm Walcutt, Miller & Co., which had purchased the record manufacturing plant of the North American Phonograph Company at 120 E. 14th St. in New York City, including a large stock of records, blanks, and recording phonographs.

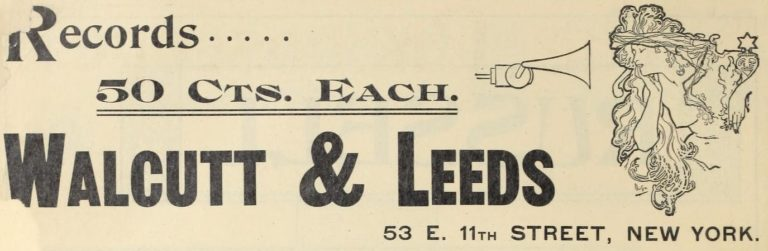

The company recorded George J. Gaskin extensively, accompanied on piano by Frank P. Banta, who would become Edison's main accompanist in later years. They also recorded many artists formerly associated with North American, like banjoist Vess Ossman, the Unique Quartette, Edward Clarance and Herbert Holcombe in addition to the "Greater New York Band". For most of the first year, records sold were original or master records, but in November 1896 they began manufacturing duplicates using devices made by Edison and the National Phonograph Company.

The American Graphophone Company sued each iteration of Walcutt and Leeds' enterprise (among many others) to assert that phonographs could not be sold due to their incorporation of graphophone technology while they were both licensed by North American. American Graphophone sued Walcutt and Leeds in February 1897 and were granted an injunction in January 1898. In December 1897, before the case was finalized, Walcutt and Leeds incorporated a new company, Walcutt and Leeds Limited, in association with George Tewksbury of the United States Phonograph Company and continued doing business in that name, and as the "Consolidated Phonograph Company" despite the injunction.

Since the organization of the National Phonograph Company, Edison had focused on manufacturing phonographs and blanks, and had left record manufacture to the United States Phonograph Company. In August 1898, National began purchasing from Walcutt and Leeds instead, because the association with United States (who had illegally shipped phonographs to Great Britain) may have threatened the closure of the North American receivership. National began manufacturing their own cylinders, and stopped ordering from Walcutt and Leeds in April 1899. At this time Walcutt and Leeds finally dissolved and Cleveland Walcutt moved to France to help Emile Berliner organize a Gramophone company there, while Leeds would join with L. Reade Catlin to form the Leeds and Catlin Company. This company would sell cylinders for a few years before transitioning into the rising disc record format in 1903 in association with the Talk-O-Phone Company of Ohio.
