= T. Mayo Geary =

Thomas Mayo Geary (September 1879 – 8 June 1945) was an American songwriter, composer, vaudeville performer, and music publishing executive. He formed a partnership with fellow Brooklyn native Harry Breen with whom he performed on the vaudeville stage in the late 1890s and early 1900s. Simultaneously, the pair worked as a song writing team with recordings of their tunes being made for the Victor Talking Machine Company and Columbia Records during the early years of the 20th century. These works are catalogued in the Discography of American Historical Recordings. Later Geary wrote songs with other lyricists, and notably wrote his own lyrics to the successful 1904 tune "The Man with the Ladder and the Hose" which honored the men of the New York City Fire Department. He worked as an executive for a variety of music publishing companies, first in New York City and later in Chicago.

== Life and career ==
The son of Mary J Geary, Thomas Mayo Geary was born in New York City in September 1879. Raised in Brooklyn, he was educated at the school of the Church of Our Lady of Mercy (demolished 1930). In his early career he worked on the vaudeville stage in a partnership with the actor and fellow Brooklyn resident Harry Breen (1878-1929). In 1902 both men were members of Spooner Stock Company. In December 1902 Geary served as the accompanist for an amateur minstrel show put on by the Cortelyou Club; a women's group in Brooklyn.

Geary and Breen began writing songs together for Tin Pan Alley in the late 1890s with Geary as composer and Breen as lyricist. One of their earliest tunes was "The Rag-Time Hymn" (1899). Their song "The Sons of Ham" was recorded by Dan W. Quinn for the Victor Talking Machine Company in 1902; a recording held in collection of the Library of Congress. Another of their songs recorded for Victor in 1902 was "O! O! Miss Caroline" which was performed on record by the vocalist Silas Leachman.

On stage, one of their songs was utilized in the 1902 Broadway musical A Daughter of the South at the Bijou Theatre, and their song "Let us forget!" was interpolated into the 1904 Broadway musical A Venetian Romance.

After he and Breen parted ways, Geary continued to perform on the stage as a monlogist, write songs with other lyricists, and worked as an executive in the music publishing world. One of his most successful songs was "The Man with the Ladder and the Hose"; a 1904 tune honoring the men of the New York City Fire Department for which he wrote both the music and the lyrics. With the lyricist W. A. Downs he wrote the World War I song "My Rose of Tipperary" (1915).

By 1905 Geary was both the president and manager of the Paul Dresser Music Company. He later worked as a manager at Harold Rossiter Music Company's Chicago office, and also managed the Chicago office of Morse Co.

Geary died of a heart attack at the age of 65 in New York City on 8 June 1945.

== Songs ==
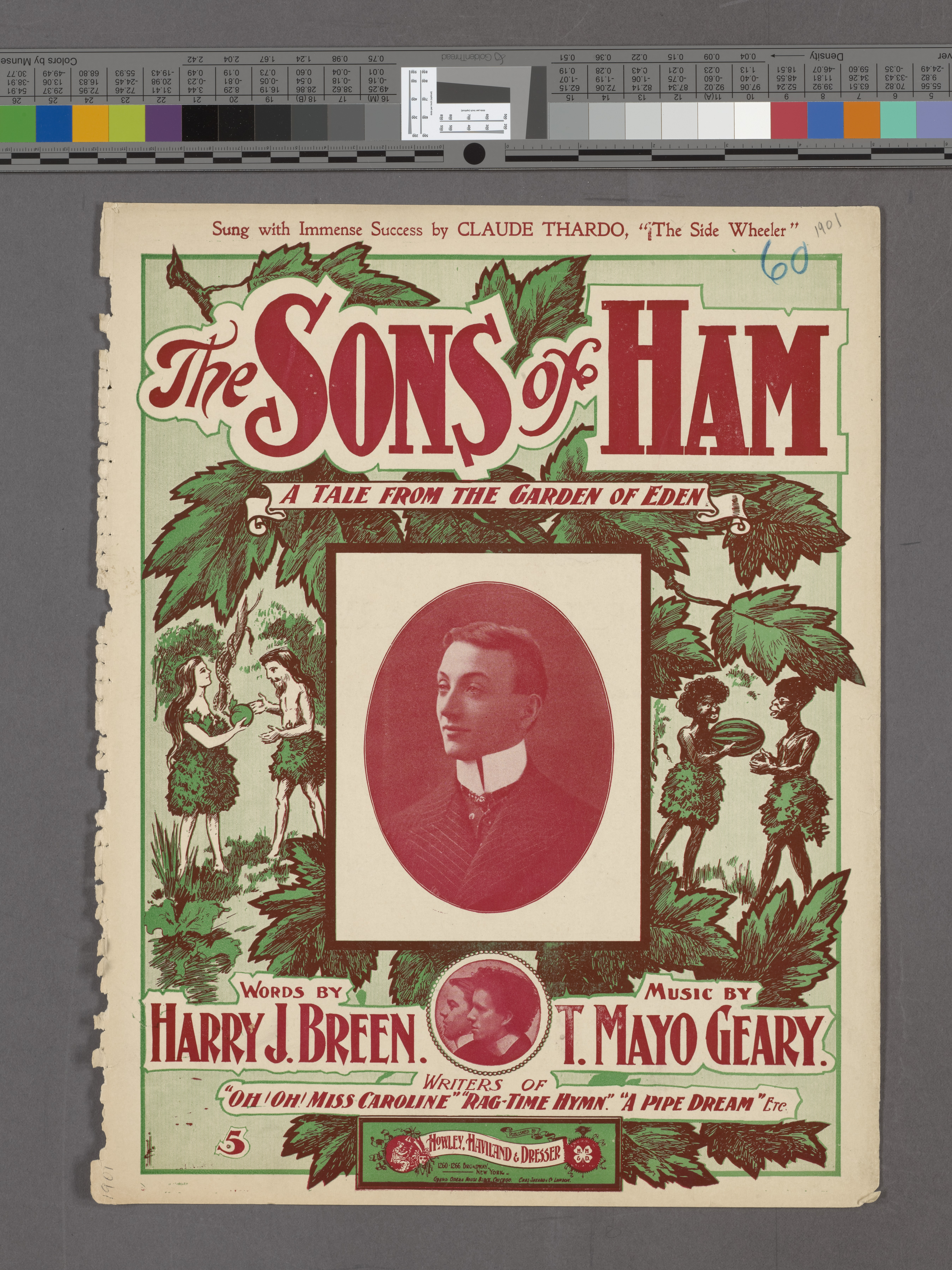
Songsheet

- "The Airships Parade"
- "The Man With the Ladder and the Hose"
- My Rose of Tipperary"
- "Ev’ry Morn I Bring Her Chicken" (Two Step) 1903
- "Your Dad Gave His Life For His Country" (March & Two Step) 1903
- "The Man with the Ladder and the Hose"
- "A Pipe Dream", with Harry Breen lyricist
- "I Wonder Will You Always Call Me Honey", words by Harry J. Breen
- "Ev'ry Morn I Bring Her Chicken. A Coon's Answer to "Violets""
- "The Sons of Ham. A Tale From the Garden of Eden", lyrics by Harry J. Breen

== Recordings ==
- "The sons of Ham" sung by Dan W. Quinn on Victor March 13, 1902
- "O! O! Miss Caroline" sung by Silas Leachman on Victor July 3, 1902
- "The Furniture Man" sung by Burt Shepard on Victor February 26, 1901
- "A Pipe Dream" sung by Dan W. Quinn on Victor June 25, 1903
- "Ev'ry Morn I Bring Her Chicken" sung by Arthur Collins on Victor June 25, 1903
- "The Man With the Ladder and the Hose sung by Billy Murray on Victor May 28, 1904

== See also ==
- George Botsford
- Paul Dresser
