= Wilcutt =

Wilcutt is a surname. Notable people with the surname include:

- D. C. Wilcutt (1923–2015), American basketball player
- Terrence W. Wilcutt (born 1949), US Marine Corps officer and NASA astronaut

== See also ==
- Walcutt
