= United States Phonograph Company =

19th Century Manufacturer of Cylinder Phonograph Records

- Founded: 1893; 133 years ago
- Founder: Victor Emerson
- Headquarters: Newark, New Jersey, United States

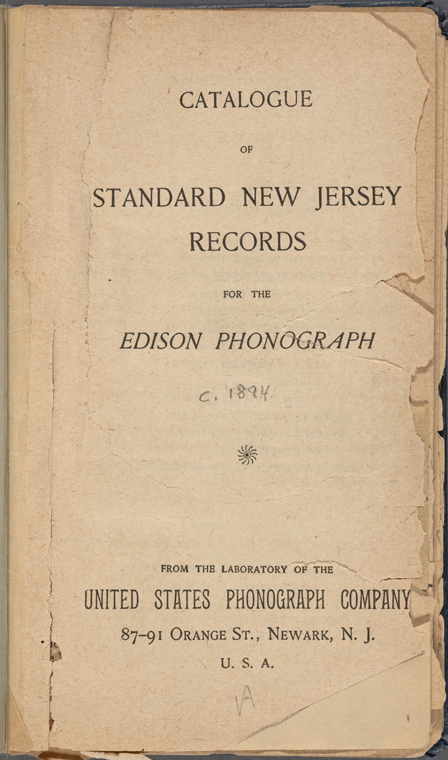
Title page of United States Phonograph Company record catalog, published circa 1894. Image from New York Public Library Digital Collections

The United States Phonograph Company was a manufacturer of cylinder phonograph records and supplies in the 1890s. It was formed in the Spring of 1893 by Victor Emerson, manager of the New Jersey Phonograph Company. Simon S. Ott and George E. Tewkesbury, heads of the Kansas Phonograph Company and inventors of an automatic phonograph joined later. It was based in Newark, New Jersey. After the collapse of the North American Phonograph Company in August 1894, the United States Phonograph Company became one of the industry's largest suppliers of records, competing mostly with the Columbia Phonograph Company who had joined with the American Graphophone Company to manufacture graphophones (at this point nearly identical to phonographs), blank wax cylinders, and original and duplicate records. The USPC manufactured duplicates as well, which allowed their recording program to reach the scale of competing with Columbia's. Their central location and proximity to New York allowed them to record the most popular artists of the 1890s, including George J. Gaskin, Dan W. Quinn, Len Spencer, Russell Hunting and Issler's Orchestra. Emerson left the company to lead Columbia's recording department around the summer of 1896. In 1897 the USPC worked with Edison's National Phonograph Company to retrofit phonographs with spring motors invented by Frank Capps. The convenience and cost savings of spring-motor phonographs like these helped shift the phonograph from a public entertainment (in parlors or exhibitions) to a consumer good. In October 1899 the company was prohibited by court order from manufacturing duplicate records, and they began supplying original records for the National Phonograph Company.[7][6][6][5][5] The later U.S. Phonograph Company of Cleveland Ohio is unrelated.
