= Walcutt =

Walcutt is a surname. Notable people with the surname include:

- Charles C. Walcutt (1838–1898), American surveyor, soldier, and politician
- William Walcutt (1819–1882), American painter and sculptor

== See also ==
- Walcott (surname)
- Walcutt and Leeds, American record manufacturing company
