= DAHR =

DAHR may refer to:

- Discography of American Historical Recordings – database catalog of recordings made by American record companies
- Democratic Alliance of Hungarians in Romania – political party in Romania
