= Drill, Ye Tarriers, Drill =

American folk song

"Drill, Ye Tarriers, Drill" is an American folk song first published in 1888 and attributed to Thomas Casey (words) and later Charles Connolly (music). It is listed as number 4401 in the Roud Folk Song Index. The song is a work song, and makes references to the construction of the American railroads in the mid-19th century. The title refers to Irish workers, drilling holes in rock to blast out railroad tunnels. It may mean either to tarry as in delay, or to terrier dogs which dig their quarry out of the ground, or from the French word for an auger, tarière. The song has been recorded by The Chad Mitchell Trio, George J. Gaskin, The Weavers and Makem and Clancy, among many others.

== Lyrics ==
One version runs:

Every morning at seven o'clock
There's twenty tarriers a workin at the rock
Then the boss comes along and he says, "Keep still,
And come down heavy on the cast iron drill."

Chorus:

So drill, ye tarriers, drill
And drill, ye tarriers, drill
Oh it's work all day for the sugar in your tay [i.e. tea]
Down beyond the railway
And drill, ye tarriers, drill.

Our new foreman is Dan McCann
I'll tell you sure, He's a mighty mean man
Last week a premature blast went off
And a mile in the air went big Jim Goff.

[Chorus]

Next time payday comes around
Jim Goff was short one buck he found
"What for?" asked he, then this reply
"You were docked for the time you were up in the sky."

[Chorus]

A verse sung by The Easy Riders circa 1956 runs:

The boss was a fine man down to the ground
And he married a lady six foot round
She baked good bread and she baked it well
But she baked that bread just as hard as hell

However, a variant of this verse commonly sung in the late 1890s runs:

The boss was a fine man all around
And he married a great big fat far down
She baked good bread and she baked it well
But she baked it as hard as the rocks of hell

== See also ==
- The Tarriers
- List of train songs
