= Columbia Grafonola =

Brand of early 20th century American phonograph

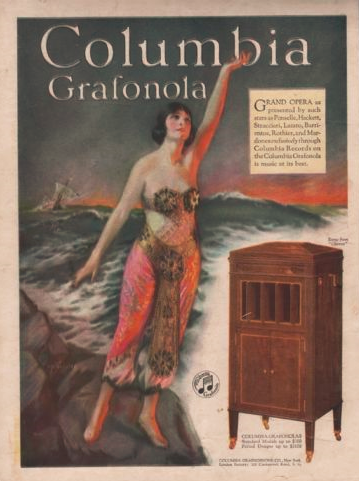
An advertisement for the Columbia Grafonola floor model

The Columbia Grafonola is a brand of early 20th century American phonograph made by the Columbia Graphophone Company. Introduced in 1907, Grafonolas are internal horn alternatives to the same company's external horn Disc Graphophones.

Until late 1925, all record players reproduced sound by purely mechanical means and relied on a so-called "amplifying" horn to efficiently couple the vibrations of the stylus and diaphragm to the space occupied by the listeners. In 1906, the Victor Talking Machine Company, Columbia's arch competitor, introduced a line of models in which the horn and other hardware were concealed within a cabinet made to look like fine furniture rather than a mechanical device. They named the new style a "Victrola". It quickly proved to be very popular and successful. Other makers, adopting the distinctive suffix, introduced their own "-ola" internal horn machines, such as Edison's Amberolas and Columbia's Grafonolas. They were soon outselling the external horn models.

At first, like nearly all other early record players, all Grafonolas were driven by a spring motor that the user had to wind up with a crank before playing a record or two. In 1915, Columbia began to introduce electric-motor-driven models, as a majority of urban areas had been wired to electrical grids. The electrified Grafonolas supported both alternating and direct currents from 110 to 220 volts. Electrified Grafonolas never gained the popularity enjoyed by the spring-motor-driven versions due to substantially higher prices and lack of electrical service in rural areas.

== Patent ==
Grafonolas were manufactured under 1886 United States Letters Patent No. 341,214 which Columbia Graphophone company acquired through its predecessor American Graphophone Company.

== Models ==
Two models were available: a portable table model and bigger stationary floor model, offering limited mobility through application of casters. The most notable table models included Grafonola Favorite introduced in 1911 and Grafonola Savoy introduced in 1915. The most notable floor models included Grafonola Symphony Grand introduced in 1907, Grafonola Regent introduced in 1909, Columbia Mignon introduced in 1910, Grafonola Princess introduced in 1911, Columbia Colonial introduced in 1913, various Period Grafonolas introduced in 1917. In order to cater to increasingly prosperous clientele Columbia Phonograph Company begun to manufacture a series of ornate, limited edition period machines. These were highly priced (some as high as $2,100.00 ) special orders, which provided consumers with options to choose styles which matched their interior decor.

American Columbia Grafonolas continued to be manufactured up until 1923 when the company was purchased by British entrepreneur Luis Sterling.

== Retail advertisements ==
Below are depictions of various Grafonola models portrayed in retail advertisements.

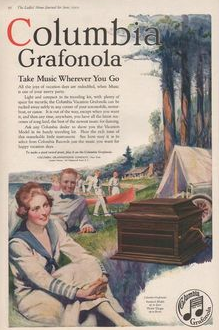
Grafonola Favorite

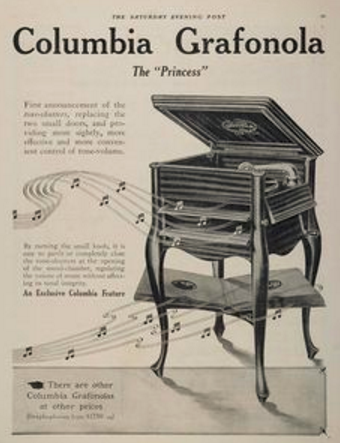
Grafonola Princess

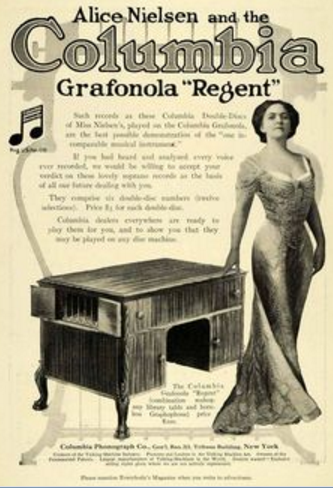
Grafonola Regent

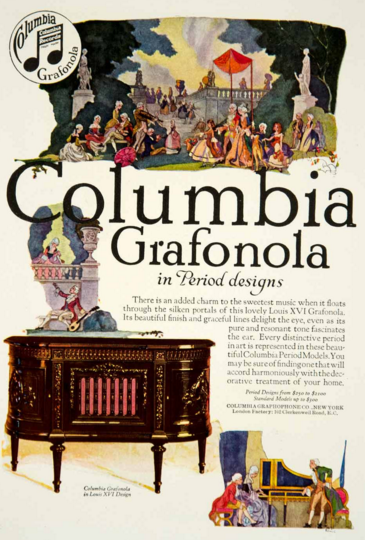
Grafonola Period Designs
