= Leeds Talk-o-Phone =

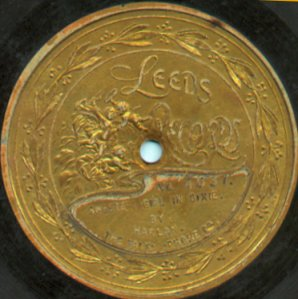
Leeds Talk-O-Phone Record Label, c. 1904

Leeds Talk-O-Phone was a record label, producing cylinders from 1894 to 1903 and single-sided lateral-cut disc phonograph records in the United States of America from about 1902 to 1909.

Leeds Records were produced by the Talk-O-Phone Company of Toledo, Ohio, owned by Wynant van Zant Pierce Bradley and Albert Irish. Talk-O-Phone produced disc phonographs (gramophones in British English) very similar to the earliest "Victor" machines of the Victor Talking Machine Company.

Some Leeds Records were unauthorized dubs of recordings made in other countries, a practice that slipped through a legal loophole at the time when international copyrights on recorded sound was poorly regulated. Some printed speculation about this obscure early record label has alleged that all Leeds material was either leased or pirated from other companies, but this was not the case. Some Leeds records were recorded specifically for Leeds, as can be confirmed by the spoken announcements at the beginning of the records. There was, however, an artist dishonesty incident in the late 1890s with Russell Hunting. Leeds had Hunting record a specialty of his called "Cohen at the Telephone". He was paid $5 per "round", as pantographic duplication yielded about 100 acceptable duplicates of a cylinder. At the end of the fourth round (recording into 4 machines yielded 16 masters) he saw a man carting 24 recordings of his "Cohen at the Telephone" away at the end of the studio. Hunting accused Leeds of attempting to defraud him. Leeds Talk-O-Phone, according to Hunting, made good upon being threatened with exposure.

A few Vaudeville stars of some note recorded for Leeds, including Byron G. Harlan. The audio fidelity of original Leeds recordings is about comparable to Victor or Columbia Records discs of some 5 years earlier.

The most notable feature of early Leeds records are the elaborate labels at the center of the discs. The labels are coated in embossed gold foil in high relief, with a trio of angels flying in clouds beside "LEEDS TALK-O-PHONE RECORDS" in flowing lettering. The lower portion of the label shows the record number, song title, and artist, in much more plain type. The whole is surrounded by a floral border.

In the early 20th century, the quality of Leeds records improved. Leeds records were issued under the rare "Century" label, the "Sir Henri" label, the "Imperial" label, and many others. None of these labels credited Leeds as the manufacturer, likely as Leeds was usually in court for infringing some patent, trademark, etc. In 1905, Leeds was rumored to have begun plans for returning to producing cylinders, sending Edison investigators scattering about. Leeds made its last known cylinders in 1903, in brown wax. Columbia made molded brown waxes at this time and introduced black waxes in 1903. This stopped Leeds cylinder production. If Leeds really did resume cylinder production in 1905, the cylinders would have to have been molded black waxes or they would not have survived on the market if they were brown. Columbia stopped brown wax molding in 1904, thus eliminating any niche competition for Leeds brown waxes. No supposed Leeds cylinders from ca. 1905 survive, nor do any Leeds cylinder catalogs.

In April 1909 Victor triumphed in a lawsuit for patent infringement, and Leeds Records and Talk-O-Phone went out of business.

== See also ==
- Walcutt and Leeds
- List of record labels
