= Operaphone Records =

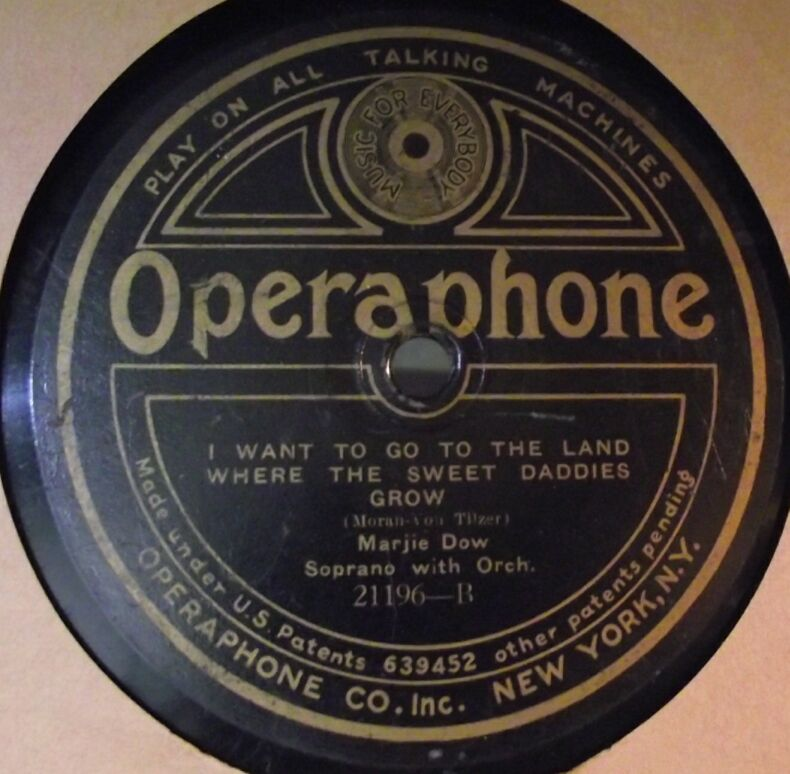
- Founded: 1915
- Status: Defunct
- Genre: Pop, light classics
- Location: New York City

Operaphone Records was a record company in existence from 1915 until 1921, who released numerous phonograph records cut in the hill-and-dale and universal-cut methods.

== History ==
The Operaphone Manufacturing Corporation of New York was established by John Fletcher, a professional musician and amateur inventor, in 1914 with George Thomas serving as company president. A pressing plant in Long Island City was soon established. Fletcher claimed in a trademark application that he had first used the name Operaphone beginning in March, 1915. Advertising for Operaphone discs first occurred in January 1916, offering 8-inch discs for 35 cents. 12 new discs (24 titles) were released each month. Operaphone claimed their output of discs tripled between January and August 1916. The price of the 10-inch records had been increased to $1.00 by July 1920. The company was reorganized in 1918 as the Operaphone Co., Inc. Eight-inch records were discontinued, some 200 having been produced, and a standard-size 10-inch series of discs was announced, but the records remained vertically cut. This series also failed to capture the public's imagination (and wallets), and a final series of 10-inch records was introduced in July 1919. These discs used Emerson's universal-cut system, which were intended to be playable phonographs using either the vertical or lateral reproducers. These met with the most success, as they are the most commonly-found Operaphone products. In March 1921 it was announced in the trade publication Talking Machine World that Operaphone would quit the record business. The company was purchased by the Remington Phonograph Company, and it was reorganized as the Olympic Disc Record Company. Subsequently, Harry Pace partnered with Fletcher to bring use of the Operaphone pressing facility to the new Black Swan Records.

Operaphone also pressed records for client labels, including All-Star, Crescent, Domestic, and Elginola.

In Canada, the discs were sold for CAN$0.50, distributed by Canadian Phonograph Company of Toronto.

== Format ==
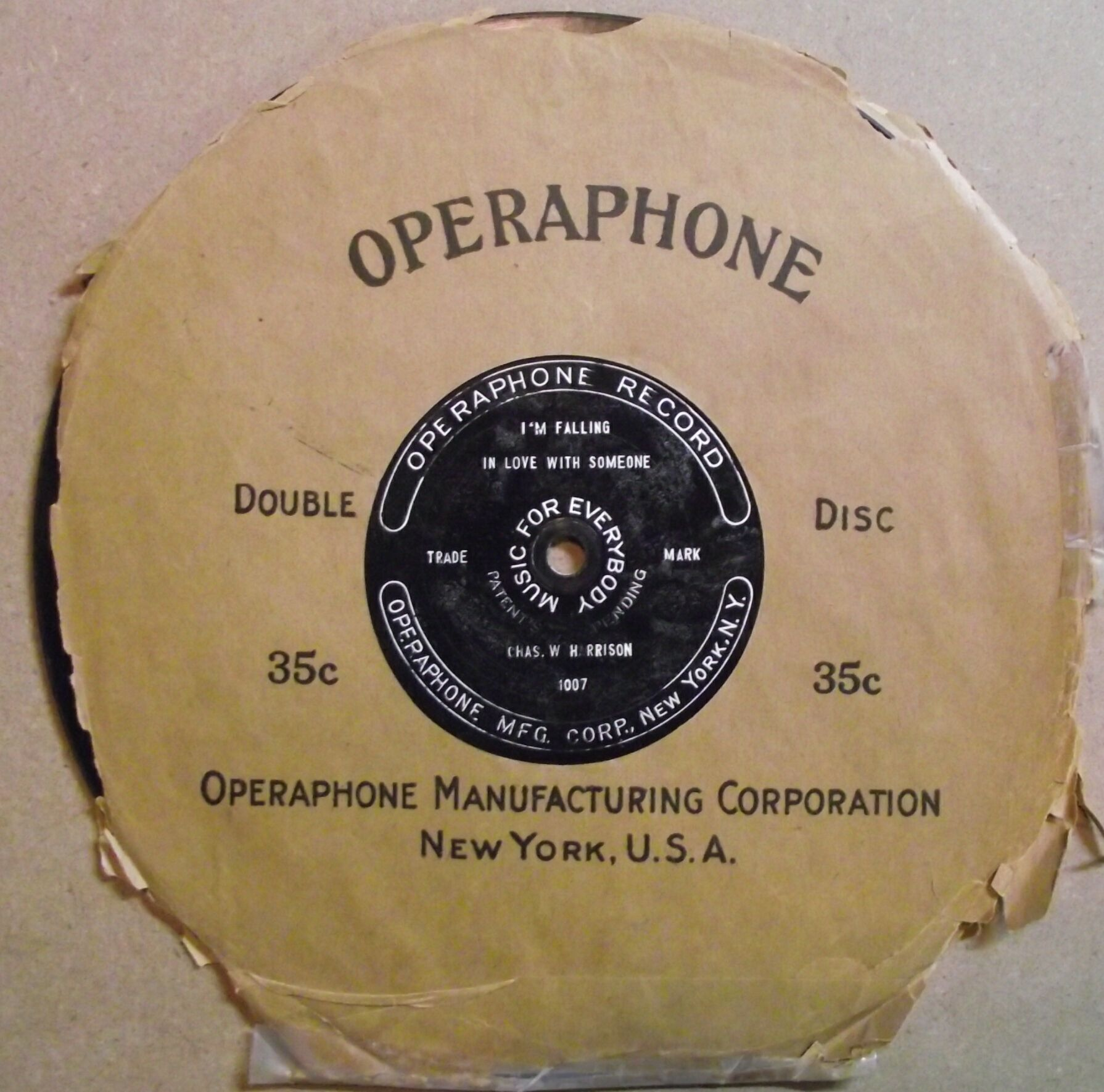
Early, paint-filled etched-label 8" Operaphone disc and tattered original sleeve

Most Operaphone discs are vertically cut, but there is not consistency regarding the groove types of these discs. Some use the narrow-cut process similar to Edison Diamond Discs, while others use the sapphire-ball cut of Pathé Records which is to be expected as some of Operaphone's masters originated from that company. The very earliest Operaphone discs were 7 inches in diameter, vertically cut, with a paint-filled, etched label. This was a very shortly-lived series, as an 8-inch series of vertically-cut discs was quickly introduced. It was claimed that these played as long as a twelve-inch discs. The painted label was replaced by an etched, frosted label similar in appearance to the Edison Diamond Disc, but this labeling format was replaced in August 1916 by a standard paper label. Ten-inch, vertically cut discs were released beginning in July 1918, and then a switch was made in July 1919 to the universal-cut format.

== Genre ==
Operaphone issued popular material of the day, including sentimental ballads, comic songs, and various instrumental selections, fitting with the motto “Music for Everybody” which appeared on the labels. A few items of moderate jazz interest by the Joseph Samuels outfit, under pseudonym, appear on Operaphone. Fletcher claimed in 1918 that he planned to release “the entire symphonic repertoire”, but nothing ever became of these plans. Despite an assertion that no serious operatic recordings were released on Operaphone, the company did issue a few: the Prologue from Pagliacci, "O, du meine Abendstern" from Tannhäuser, and "The heart bowed down" from The Bohemian Girl by frequently-recorded English baritone Alan Turner (1870 - ?), and "Salut, demeure" from Faust, "La donna è mobile" from Rigoletto, "Then you'll remember me" from The Bohemian Girl, "Celeste Aida" from Aida, and "M'appari" from Martha by American lyric tenor Charles W. Harrison. All of these were sung in English. Operaphone's most important serious vocal recordings were four sides by the American dramatic soprano Gertrude Rennyson (1875-1953), who had been prima donna with American impresario Henry W. Savage's "English Grand Opera Company" from 1903 to 1905 before going to Europe to sing leading roles at Brussels, Prague, Dresden, the Vienna Hofoper, the Royal Opera House, Covent Garden, plus the 1909 and 1911 seasons at Bayreuth, and had made only four other sides at Columbia in 1912; her Operaphone selections included "Un bel di" from Madama Butterfly and "Elsa's Traum" from Lohengrin.

In most of their early releases Operaphone attempted to increase record sales by placing highly disparate material on the opposite side of their records. The strategy backfired, and Operaphone ceased the practice within a few months.

All later 10-inch material was leased from Pathé, but there are known instances where material appeared on Operaphone as early as a month before the recording was issued on Pathé itself. There was no public acknowledgement of a tie between the two companies.

== Selected artists ==
- Sam Ash
- Al Bernard
- Collins & Harlan
- Arthur Collins
- Frank Ferera
- Ernest Hare
- Charles W. Harrison
- Billy Jones
- Lewis James
- Billy Murray
- Dan W. Quinn
- Aileen Stanley
