= George J. Gaskin =

Northern Irish-born American musician (1863–1920)

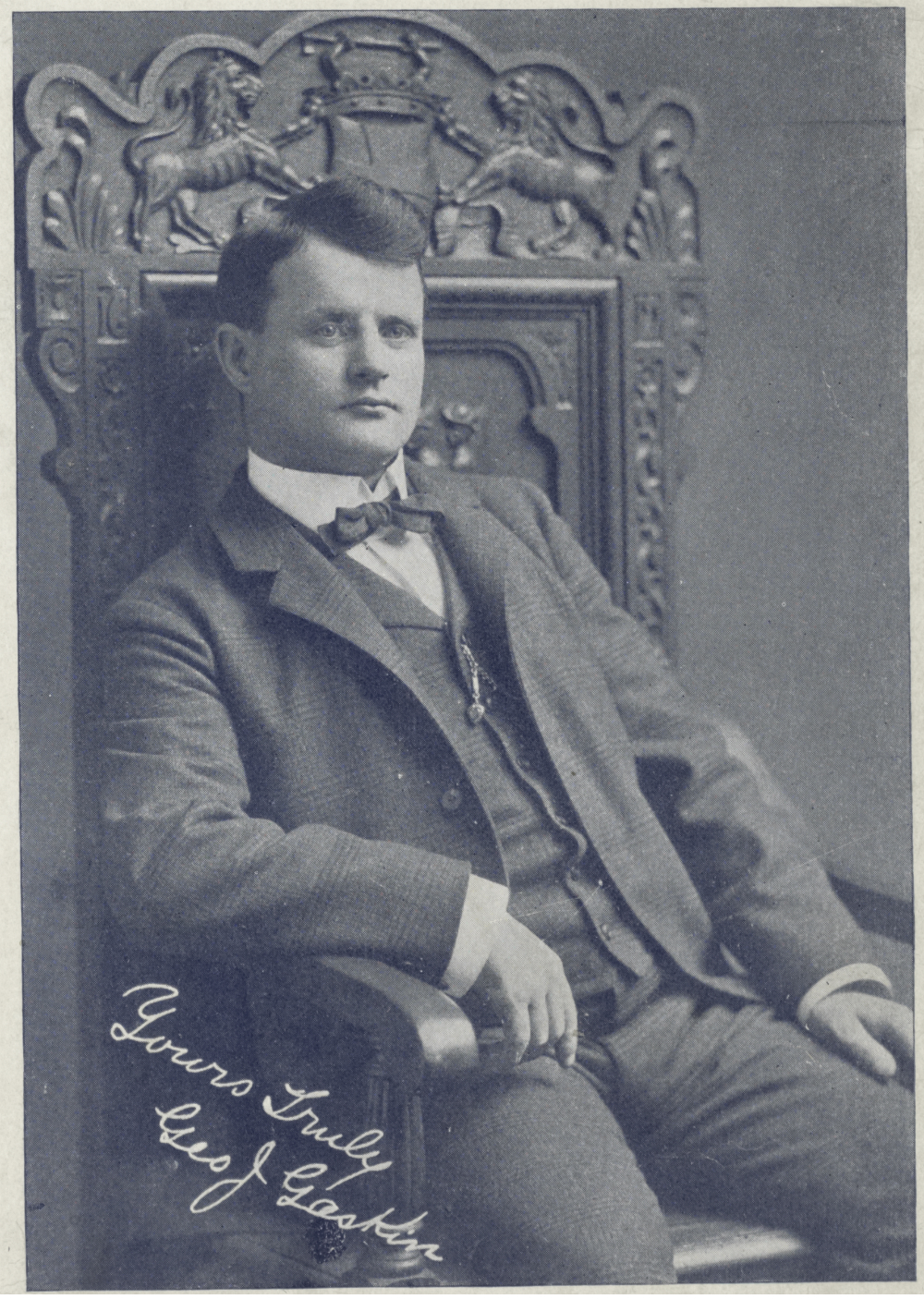
- George J. Gaskin from The Phonoscope magazine, November 1896
- Born: February 16, 1863; Belfast, Ireland
- Died: December 14, 1920 (aged 57); New York, U.S.
- Occupation: Recording artist
- Years active: 1891-1905

George Jefferson Gaskin (February 16, 1863 – December 14, 1920) was a Northern Irish-born American recording artist, being one of the most popular singers in the United States during the 1890s.

== Biography ==
Gaskin was born in Belfast, Ireland, but migrated to the United States in his youth. According to US Naturalization records, Gaskin arrived in New York City in June 1880 but did not attain citizenship until October 18, 1892. At that time he gave his address as 109 East 102nd Street. Gaskin's earliest known recordings were done for the Edison North American Phonograph Company on June 2, 1891. He may have been only the second vocalist to make commercial records for Edison (the first may have been African American whistler and singer George W. Johnson, recorded just one day earlier, on June 1).

He was nicknamed the "Silver-voiced Irish tenor", and specialized in sentimental Irish ballads and the popular songs of tin pan alley. He recorded prolifically in the 1890s, for the United States Phonograph Company, Columbia Phonograph Company, and Berliner Gramophone. Except for one US Everlasting cylinder in 1910 and a single side for the American Pathé company in 1916, Gaskin's recording career ended in 1904 for reasons unknown. Between 1904 and 1910, he directed the annual Robert Emmet tribute concert for the Phillip Sheridan club, an Irish-American society, held in Passaic, New Jersey. He died in New York on December 14, 1920.

His repertoire included "Drill, Ye Tarriers, Drill" (1891), "Oh Promise Me" (1893), "After the Ball" (1893), "The Sidewalks of New York", (1895), "A Hot Time in the Old Town" (1896), "On the Banks of the Wabash" (1897), and "When You Were Sweet Sixteen" (1900).

== Recordings ==
His extant recordings include:

- "Drill Ye Tarriers Drill" (Released on June 2, 1891)
- "After the Ball" (1893)
- "I Don't Want to Play in Your Yard" (1895)
- "The Sidewalks of New York" (1895)
- "All Coons Look Alike to Me" (1896)
- "Scanlan's Swing Song" (1896)
- "She May Have Seen Better Days" (1896)
- "It Don't Seem Like the Same Old Smile" (1897)
- "Sweet Rosie O'Grady" (1897)
- "The Best in the House is None Too Good For Reilly" (1897)
- "Yankee Doodle" (1897)
- "America" (1898)
- "My Old New Hampshire Home" (1898)
- "She Was Bred In Old Kentucky" (1898)
- "Uncle Sam, Why Are You Waiting?" (1898)
- "Drill Ye Tarriers Drill" (1899)
- "Old Folks at Home" (1899)
- "What is Home Without Love" (1899)
- "Mavourneen" (1890s)
- "Just Say Goodbye Again" (1890s)
- "Whisper Your Mother's Name" (1896–1900)
- "Killarney" (1900)
- "While the Band is Playing Dixie" (1901)
- "When the Harvest Days Are Over" (1902)
- "I'm Wearing My Heart Away for You" (1903)
- "The Bassoon" (1903)
- "If A Girl Like You Loved A Boy Like Me" (1905)
- "Sally in Our Alley" (1905)
