= Violin Sonata No. 2 (Saint-Saëns) =

Sonata for piano and violin by Camille Saint-Saëns

- Violin sonata by Camille Saint-Saëns
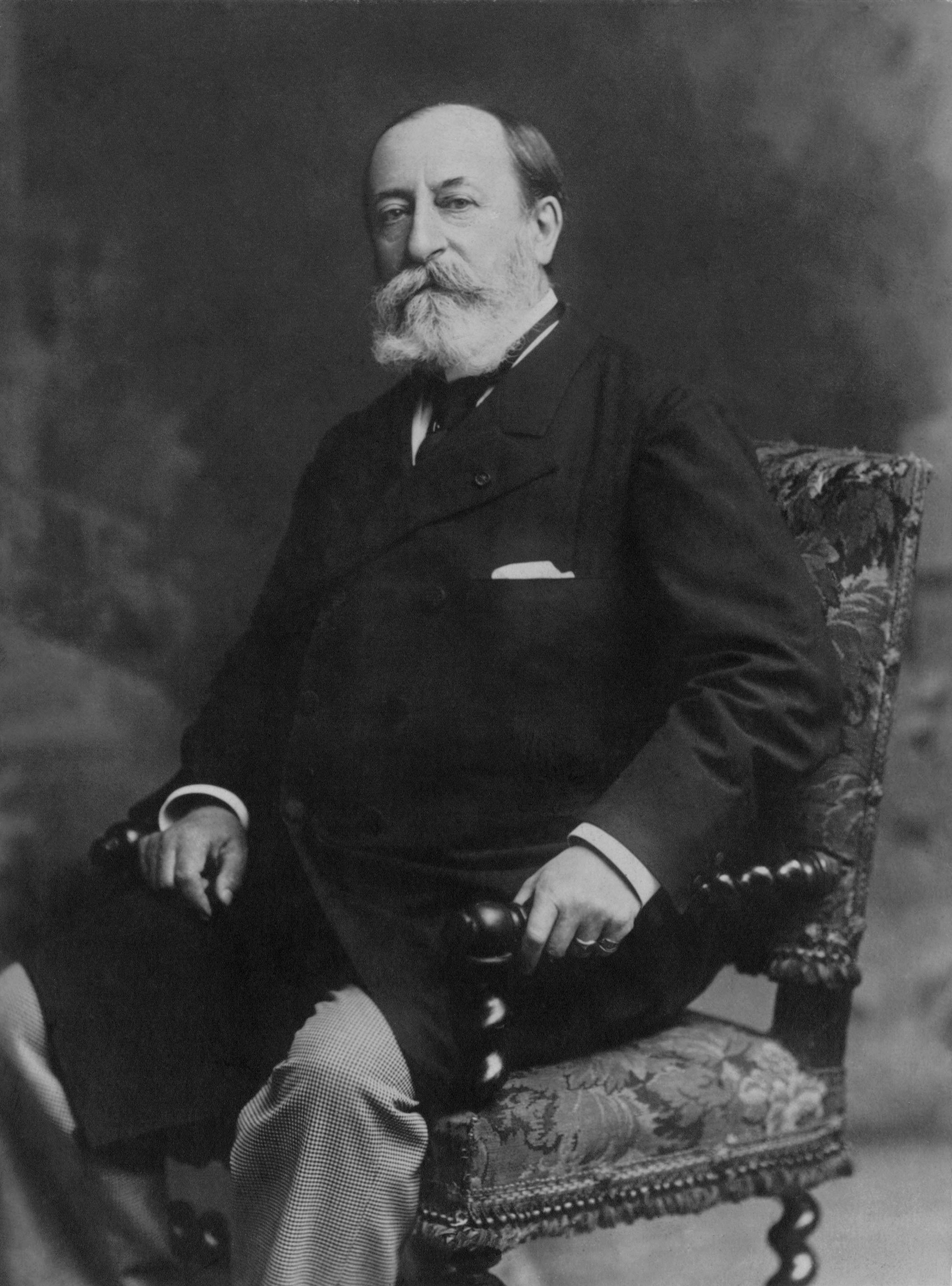
- Camille Saint-Saëns in 1900
- Key: E♭ major
- Opus: 102
- Composed: February–March 1896
- Dedication: Léon-Alexandre and Marie-Louise Carembat
- Published: June 1896 (Durand)
- Duration: 21 minutes
- Movements: four
- Scoring: violin; piano

Premiere
- Date: 2 June 1896
- Location: Salle Pleyel, Paris
- Performers: Pablo de Sarasate; Camille Saint-Saëns

The Violin Sonata No. 2 in E♭ major, Op. 102, was written by Camille Saint-Saëns from February to March 1896, and premiered on 2 June 1896 in Paris.

== History ==
The sonata was composed in Egypt from 17 February to 15 March 1896. It was dedicated to Léon-Alexandre Carembat, who won first prize for violin at the Conservatoire de Paris in 1883 and played for the Orchestre de l'Opéra, and his wife Marie-Louise Adolphi, who won first prize for piano at the Conservatoire in 1883. The couple had given several concerts with Saint-Saëns' works.

The first performance before the official premiere was given by Eugène Ysaÿe and Raoul Pugno on 18 May 1896. The premiere itself, as part of Saint-Saëns' 50th anniversary concert on 2 June 1896 at Salle Pleyel, was given by Pablo de Sarasate and Saint-Saëns for the benefit of the Association des artistes musiciens.

== Structure ==
External audio
- Performed by Fanny Clamagirand and Vanya Cohen
- I. Poco allegro più tosto moderato
- II. Scherzo. Vivace
- III. Andante
- IV. Allegro grazioso non presto

The sonata consists of four movements. A performance takes approximately 21 minutes.

1. Poco allegro più tosto moderato
2. Scherzo. Vivace
3. Andante – Allegretto scherzando ma ben moderato
4. Allegro grazioso non presto – Meno mosso, ben moderato – Allegro

The opening movement is held in sonata form. The first is striving and energetic, while the second is directed to be played dolce. In the recapitulation, both themes are presented simultaneously.

The second movement is in the classic scherzo and trio form. The trio, in the form of a three-part canon, makes use of counterpoint. Saint-Saëns was particularly proud of the scherzo, which he called "terribly difficult". Decades later, he wrote to his publisher Durand on 23 April 1919: "I don't think that Franck, whose canons are all praised, ever composed one as pretty as the one that forms the Trio of this scherzo, a canon that I wrote in Aswan. [...] I would rather play the sonata than hear it played by someone else who would not play it to my taste. What I regret is that I cannot play the violin part as well!"

In the Andante, the violin performs a long, dreamy melody above a piano accompaniment consisting of continually rising scales that blur the harmony in an impressionistic way. Duncan Druce notes that though Saint-Saëns disliked the music of Debussy, he comes "quite close to a Debussian fascination with sonority for its own sake". In contrast, the middle section (Allegretto scherzando ma ben moderato) seems to be another "miniature scherzo".

The finale is in rondo form, with two themes, bright and classical in tone.

Compared to the first violin sonata, which is a brilliant concert piece, the second differs in character. Saint-Saëns himself called it a "very serious chamber work" that "will only be understood after the eighth performance". The sonata signalled a stylistic change in Saint-Saëns' music, with a lighter, clearer sound for the piano, characteristic of his music from then onwards.

== Legacy ==
As with the first violin sonata, the second sonata was quickly picked up by a number of leading violinists soon after publication.
