= Fred Hylands =

American pianist (1872–1913)

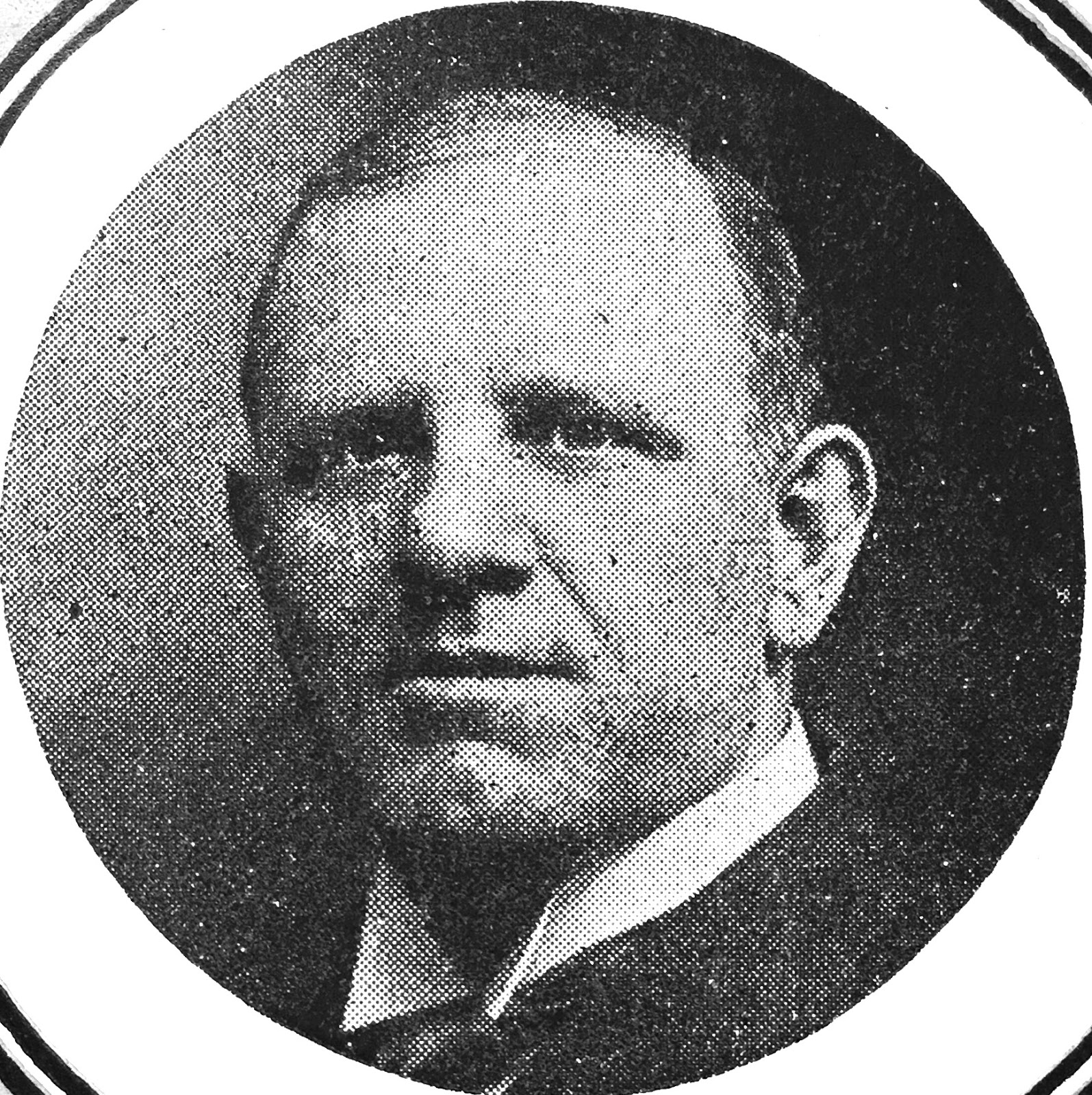

Background information
- Birth name: Frederick E. Hylands
- Born: 1872; Fort Wayne, Indiana
- Died: October 14, 1913 (aged 40–41); Lancashire, England
- Genres: Ragtime
- Occupation(s): Musician, manager
- Instrument: Piano
- Years active: 1887–1913
- Labels: Columbia

Frederick E. Hylands (1872 – October 14, 1913) was an American pianist, composer and publisher active from 1887 to 1913.

== Biography ==
Fred Hylands was born in 1872, in or near Fort Wayne, Indiana, to Charles Hylands and Mary Hylands (Whitney). He began playing piano at a young age, and performed locally with his sister Ethel by age 15. Hylands moved to Chicago in the early 1890s and married singer and actress Maria Francis Stevens in 1895. He moved to New York City the following year, and was hired as the house pianist of the Columbia Phonograph Company, which had opened an office at 1159 Broadway in 1895. He was an early adopter and proponent of ragtime music, and his accompaniments are some of the earliest examples of the form on record.

In addition to Hylands' work with Columbia, he performed in New York City and toured the eastern U.S., managed musical theatre, and composed ragtime songs. In 1899, he opened a music publishing business called Hylands, Spencer and Yeager, with Len Spencer (a recording artist who shared Fred's penchant for ragtime) and singer Harry W. Yeager.

Fred and Maria Hylands were busy in musical theatre and vaudeville in the first years of the 20th century. Fred was a member of the "White Rats Actors' Union", and co-founder of the short-lived "Knights of the Footlights", another union for entertainment workers. He died October 14, 1913, while on tour in Lancashire England due to complications from diabetes.

== Compositions ==
- The Narcissus Gavotte (1897)
- The Darkey Volunteer (1898)
- My Old-Fashioned Girl (1898)
- I'se de Lady Friend of Mister Rastus Jackson (1899)
- Pretty Kitty Clover (1899)
- You Don't Stop the World from Going Round (1899)
- The Prize Cake-Walker is Old Uncle Sam (1899)
- 'Tis Best for Us to Part (1899)
- Upper Coondom (1899)
- Well, I nebber could forgit dat happy Home (1900)
- My Dusky Queen (1901)
- The Japanese Patrol (1904)
- The Beauty Doctor (Musical) (1905)
- Yankee Doodle Girl (Musical) (1905)
- It Looks Like a Good Old Summer Time (1911)
- Be a Good Little Girl (1911)
- Honey Lou! (I Love No One but You) (1912)
- The Rag-Time Boarding House (1912)
- The Lightning Rag (1912)
- Joe! Oh Joe! (Everything Is Cozy and the Lights are Low) (1912)
- You've Got the Rag-i-rit-is (1913)

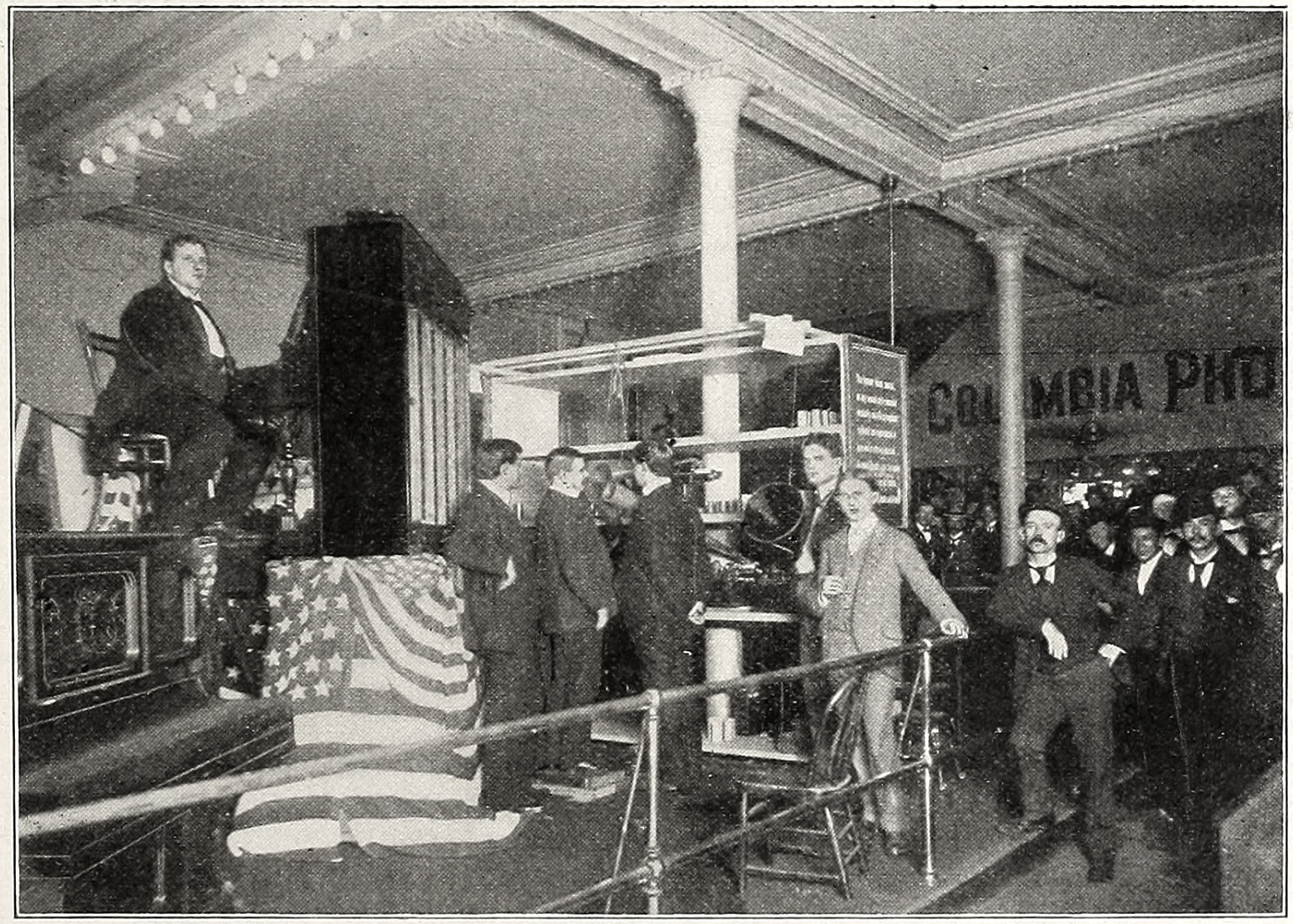
Fred Hylands at the studio of the Columbia Phonograph Company, 1898
