= Silas Leachman =

American singer

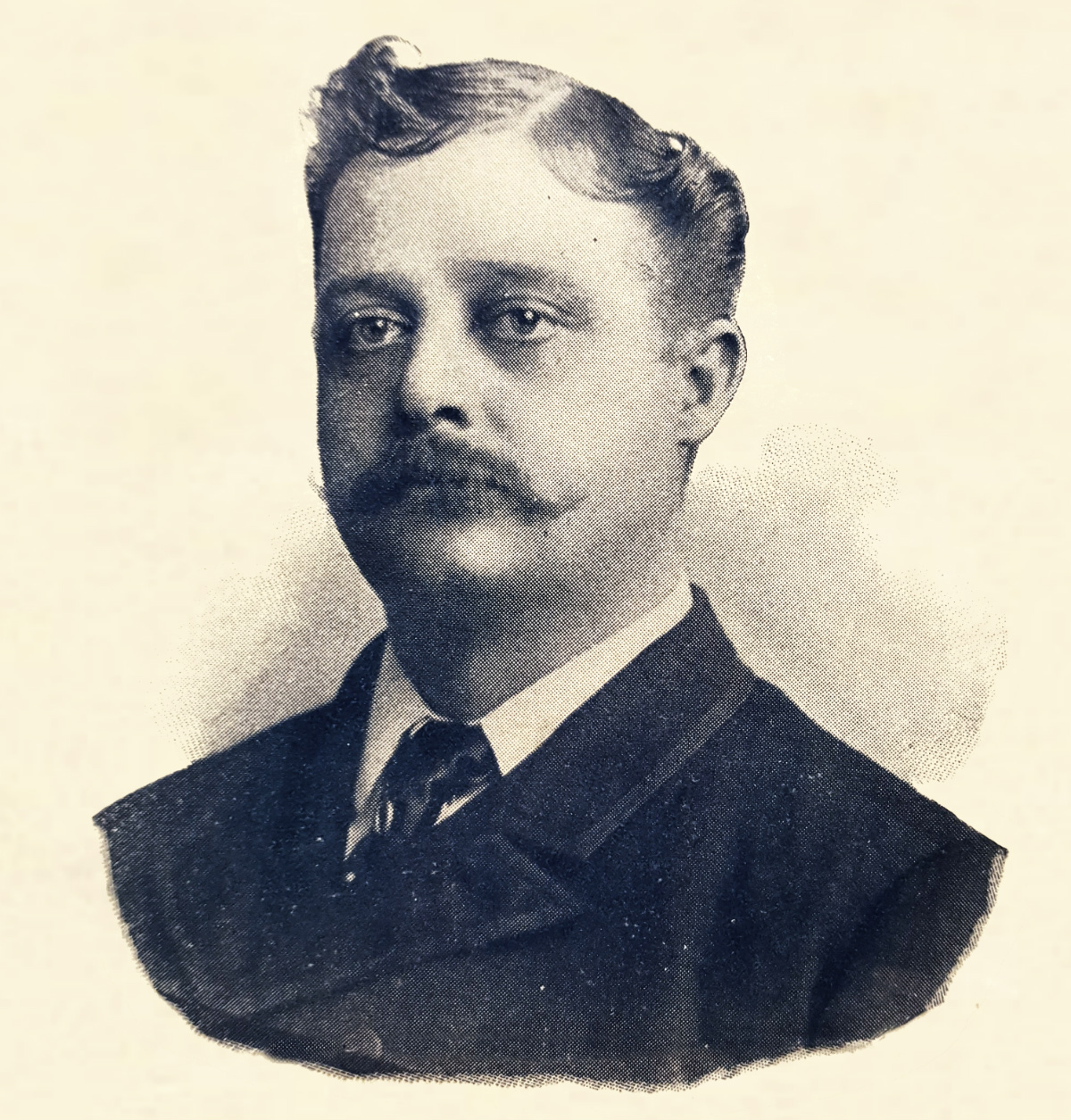
Silas Leachman, ca. 1895, from Chicago Talking Machine Company ad

Silas Field Leachman (20 August 1859 – 28 April 1936) was an American pioneer recording artist, possibly the first person to make recordings in Chicago and known for making hundreds of thousands of phonograph cylinder recordings in the 1890s.

He was born in Louisville, Kentucky, and worked on the railroad before marrying and moving to Chicago in the 1880s. He began recording for the North American Phonograph Company's Chicago branch around 1892, then recorded prolifically for the Chicago Talking Machine Company in the later 1890s. He later recorded for Columbia and, after 1901, Victor. According to a report first published in the Chicago Tribune in 1895, he recorded in a wide range of styles, often under assumed names, and by that time claimed to have personally produced almost 250,000 cylinders. The report sets out in detail Leachman's work, at the very start of the recording industry:

Away out in the extreme northwestern part of the city, near the Milwaukee Railroad tracks, Silas Leachman puts in four or five hours every day singing at the top of his lungs, though not a soul is in hearing but his wife. When he gets tired of singing, he varies the proceedings by preaching a negro sermon, or gives an imitation of an Irish wake, and altogether conducts himself in a way that would lead the neighbors to consider him a fit subject for a lunatic asylum — if there were any neighbors, but there are not.
This is the very reason Mr. Leachman chose the lonely spot for his residence. No one ever goes out there to hear him sing, and yet he is getting rich at it. He earns something over $50 every day, though he never sees one of his auditors. Mr. Leachman sings for phonographs, and, as he has a monopoly of the business in the West, he contrives to keep busy, and has even been heard to express a wish that he were twins. He has better protection in his monopoly than a copyright or an injunction, or unlimited legal talent could afford. Nature gave him the peculiar qualities that enable him to reproduce his voice perfectly on the wax cylinders. Hundreds of persons have attempted to break in on his profitable monopoly, but the results of their efforts put an effectual stop to their attempts. And so Mr. Leachman goes on enjoying the monopoly and reaping the profits thereof.
There are four other men in the East that also do work for the phonograph; but while they have to have a man to play the piano while they sing, another to make the announcement, another to change the cylinders, and a fourth to keep the machines in order, Mr. Leachman is the entire show in himself. Furthermore, he can give an unlimited number of impersonations, while the other four men are limited to a few specialties each. Mr. Leachman is a natural mimic, and therein lies the secret of his success. He sings ballads, negro melodies, and Irish, Chinese and Dutch dialect songs. He plays his own accompaniment on the piano and takes care of the machines. He prepares three "records", as the wax cylinders are called, at one time.
To do this three phonographs are placed near the piano, with the horns at one side pointing away from the keyboard at an angle of forty-five degrees. The horns have to be placed very carefully, for a fifth of an inch makes a great difference in the tone the cylinders will reproduce. When the horns have been adjusted exactly right, Mr. Leachman seats himself at the piano, and, turning his head away over his right shoulder, begins to sing as loud as he can, and that is pretty loud, for he is a man of powerful physique, and has been practicing loud singing for four years. He has been doing this work until his throat has become calloused so that he no longer becomes exhausted after singing a short time.
As soon as he has finished one song, he slips off the wax cylinders, puts on three fresh ones without leaving his seat, and goes right on singing until a passing train compels him to stop for a short time. In the four years he has been in the business he has made nearly 250,000 records. So great is the demand for them that he cannot fill his orders. It is such exceedingly hard work that he cannot sing more than four hours a day. He gets thirty-five cents for every cylinder that he prepares. He has a repertoire of four hundred and twenty pieces, and his work is put on the market under a score of names. He has a remarkable memory, and, after once hearing a song, cannot only repeat the words and music correctly, but can imitate excellently the voice and expression of the singer.

A baritone, he became best known for "coon songs" - stereotypical portrayals of African American life - although little regard was paid to the quality of the performances themselves. His popular recordings included "Daddy Wouldn't Buy Me a Bow Wow" (1892), "Dem Golden Slippers" (1894), "I Guess I'll Have To Telegraph My Baby" (1899), "A Big Fat Coon" (1901) and "Bill Bailey, Won't You Please Come Home?" (1902).

He continued to record in the early years of the new century, but by 1920 worked as a deputy sheriff. He eventually became Inspector of Personnel for the Chicago Police. He died in Chicago in 1936 at the age of 76.
