= Unique Quartette =

American vocal quartet

The Unique Quartette was a black vocal quartet in New York City. Founded in the mid-1880s by Joseph Moore, it is best known for a handful of wax cylinder recordings made in the first half of the 1890s. It is the earliest known black vocal group to have been commercially recorded, with the first recordings made in December 1890 for the New York Phonograph Company.

Several of the quartet's wax cylinders survive, most recorded by the North American Phonograph Company, and are among the earliest extant recordings of any African-American musicians, along with recordings by George W. Johnson and a single surviving cylinder recorded by Louis Vasnier.

The earliest surviving wax cylinder recording of the Unique Quartette — and thus the earliest surviving recording by any African-American musical group (as opposed to soloist, since George W. Johnson's “The Whistling Coon” predates this by two years) — is Edison 694, "Mamma’s Black Baby Boy", recorded in 1893. There are two copies left, one in the Library of Congress and one privately owned. This may also be the earliest barbershop quartet recording by a quartet of any ethnicity.
