= Russell Hunting =

American comic entertainer and pioneer sound recordist (1864–1943)

Russell Dinsmore Hunting (May 8, 1864 – February 20, 1943) was an American comic entertainer, pioneer sound recordist, and an influential figure in the early years of the recorded music industry. He was described as "the most popular pre-1900 recording artist".

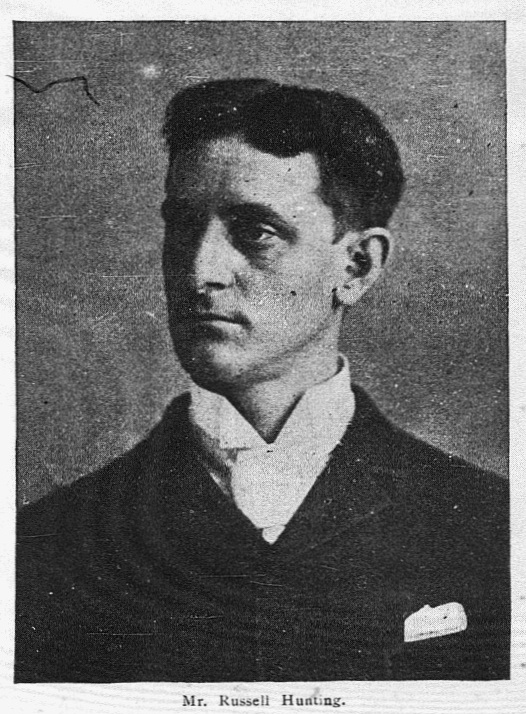
Hunting in 1892

== Biography ==
He was born in West Roxbury, Massachusetts, and began his career as a dramatic actor in the Boston Theatre Company. He began his recording career around 1891 recording for the New England Phonograph Company. He became famous for his series of comedy sketches about an Irish character named Michael Casey. The recordings consisted of rapid-fire cross-talk between two characters, with Hunting taking all the parts. From 1892 he recorded the Michael Casey skits for Columbia Records, as well as for other companies, and several of his recordings such as "Michael Casey at the Telephone" and "Michael Casey Taking the Census" (both 1892) became famous. In 1893, Hunting recorded the earliest version of the baseball poem "Casey at the Bat" (Columbia Graphophone Grand, #9649). After that, his popular "Casey" format was often imitated.

In 1896 Hunting founded the first independent magazine for the recording industry, Phonoscope, and set up a phonograph shop in New York with his partner Charles M. Carlson. He also, about this time, recorded a series of indecent recordings, for saloons and amusement arcades on Coney Island, using pseudonyms such as Manly Tempest and Willy Fathand. Hunting was identified by his distinctive voice, and a detective working for Anthony Comstock, the founder of the newly formed New York Society for the Suppression of Vice arrested him for violating obscenity laws. Hunting was found guilty and spent three months in prison. Some of Hunting's lewd recordings were included on the 2007 compilation Actionable Offenses: Indecent Phonograph Recordings from the 1890s.

In 1898, a cylinder record company called Leeds Talk-O-Phone had Hunting record a skit, "Cohen at the Telephone". He was paid $5 per "round", as pantographic duplication yielded about 100 acceptable duplicates of a cylinder. At the end of the fourth round (recording into 4 machines yielded 16 masters) he saw a man carting 24 recordings of his "Cohen at the Telephone" away at the end of the studio. Hunting accused Leeds Talk-O-Phone of attempting to defraud him. The company, according to Hunting, made good upon being threatened with exposure.

Hunting traveled to England in 1898, and became recording director of Edison Bell Records. After the United Kingdom became involved in the Boer War in 1899, he recorded "The Departure of the Troop Ship", with the sounds of "crowds at the quayside, bands playing the troops up the gang-plank, bugles sounding 'All ashore', farewell cries of 'Don’t forget to write', troops singing "Home Sweet Home", which gradually receded in the distance, and the far-away mournful hoot of the steamer whistle." According to Fred Gaisberg, Nellie Melba said that the record influenced her above anything else to make records. While Hunting was in England, James H. White recorded "Casey" material for Edison Records, around 1901. Then, in 1905, John Kaiser became the voice of "Casey" for Edison.

Hunting also recorded skits for Zonophone in Britain. In 1904, Hunting and Louis Sterling formed the Sterling Record Company, which became the Russell Hunting Record Company Ltd., in London. The company produced Sterling cylinder records and Linguaphone language instruction records, but went out of business in 1908. Hunting then joined the Pathé company in Paris as director of recording, traveling the world on the company's behalf, and setting up its US arm before returning to Pathé to take charge of its European recording activities. He also maintained an occasional recording career, recording "The Departure of the First U.S. Troops for France", again with sound effects of bands and crowds, in New York in 1917.

He finally returned to the US in 1940. Hunting died in Westchester County, New York, in 1943, at the age of 78.
