= Graphophone =

Phonograph

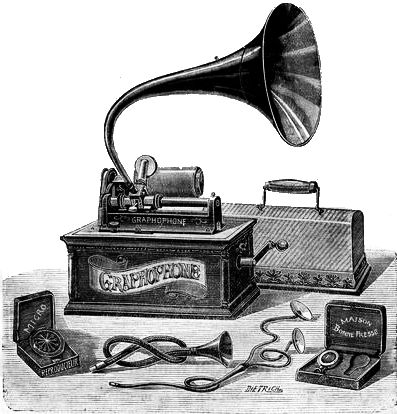
- A Columbia "Precision" Graphophone, a cylinder model sold in France, 1901
- Classification: Phonograph
- Industry: Music
- Application: Sound recording and reproduction
- Inventor: Alexander Graham Bell; Charles Sumner Tainter; Chichester Bell
- Invented: 1886 (140 years ago)

The Graphophone was the name and trademark of an improved version of the phonograph. It was initially designed at the Volta Laboratory established by Alexander Graham Bell in Washington, D.C., United States. It was co-invented by Alexander Graham Bell, Charles Sumner Tainter, and Chichester Bell in 1886.

Its trademark usage was acquired successively by the Volta Graphophone Company, the American Graphophone Company, the North American Phonograph Company, and finally by the Columbia Phonograh Company (known today as Columbia Records), all of which either produced or sold Graphophones.

== Research and development ==
It took five years of research under the directorship of Benjamin Hulme, Harvey Christmas, Charles Sumner Tainter and Chichester Bell at the Volta Laboratory to develop and distinguish their machine from Thomas Edison's Phonograph.

Among their innovations, the researchers experimented with lateral recording techniques as early as 1881. Contrary to the vertically-cut grooves of Edison Phonographs, the lateral recording method used a cutting stylus that moved from side to side in a "zig zag" pattern across the record. While cylinder phonographs never employed the lateral cutting process commercially, this later became the primary method of phonograph disc recording.

Please observe the above information might be misleading. The Graphophone needle incised a groove vertically while Edison indented vertically (in patent terminology). The above mentioned lateral zig-zag groove was patented by Emile Berliner on Nov.8, 1877. Patent No. 372,786 in United States Patent Office and was the basis for mr. Berliners Gramophone (Grammophone) disc which he patented July, 28, 1896.

Bell and Tainter also developed wax-coated cardboard cylinders for their record cylinder. Edison's grooved mandrel covered with a removable sheet of tinfoil (the actual recording medium) was prone to damage during installation or removal. Tainter received a separate patent for a tube assembly machine to automatically produce the coiled cardboard tube cores of the wax cylinder records. The shift from tinfoil to wax resulted in increased sound fidelity and record longevity.

Besides being far easier to handle, the wax recording medium also allowed for lengthier recordings and created superior playback quality. Additionally the Graphophones initially deployed foot treadles to rotate the recordings, then wind-up clockwork drive mechanisms, and finally migrated to electric motors, instead of the manual crank on Edison's Phonograph.

== Commercialization ==
In 1885, when the Volta Laboratory Associates were sure that they had a number of practical inventions, they filed patent applications and began to seek out investors. The Volta Graphophone Company of Alexandria, Virginia, was created on January 6, 1886, and incorporated on February 3, 1886. It formed to control the patents and to handle the commercial development of their sound recording and reproduction inventions, one of which became the first Dictaphone.

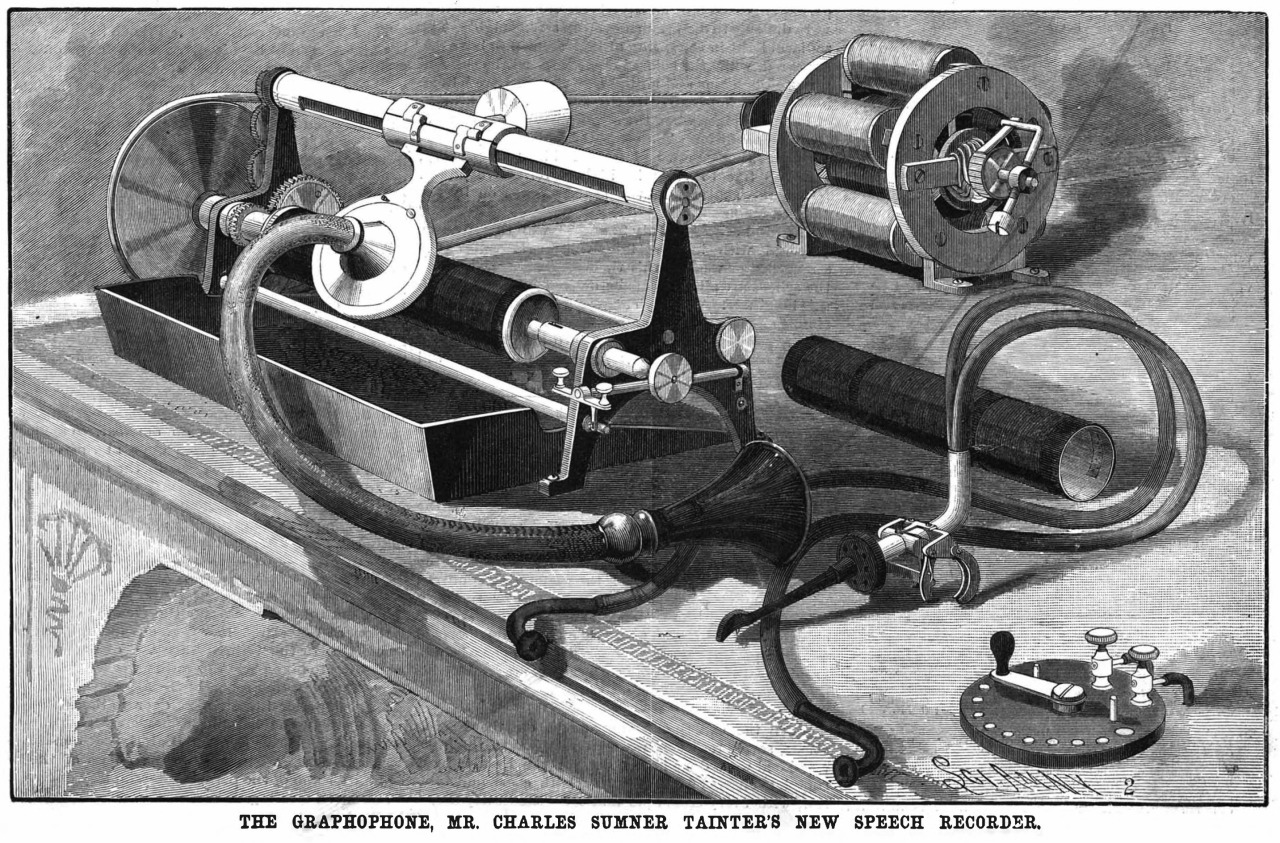
American Graphophone's 1888 wax cylinder graphophone. The machines were marketed for only a few years by American Graphophone and the North American Phonograph Company, but were superseded by Edison's 1888 'perfected phonograph' and its solid wax cylinders.

After the Volta Associates gave several demonstrations in Washington, D.C., businessmen from Philadelphia created the American Graphophone Company on March 28, 1887, to produce and sell the machines for the budding phonograph marketplace. The Volta Graphophone Company then merged with American Graphophone, which itself later evolved into Columbia Records. The Howe Machine Factory (for sewing machines) in Bridgeport, Connecticut, became American Graphophone's manufacturing plant. Tainter resided there for several months to supervise manufacturing before becoming ill, but later went on to continue his inventive work for many years. The small Bridgeport plant, which initially produced three or four machines a day, later became the Dictaphone Corporation.

== Subsequent developments ==
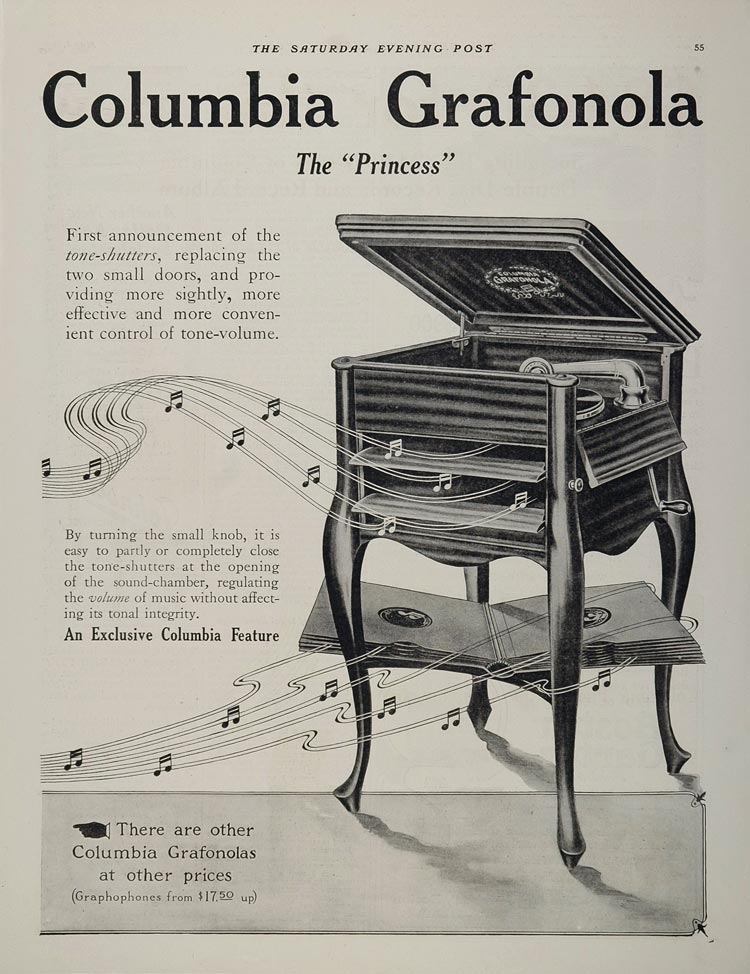
A 1912 advertisement for the Columbia Grafonola

Shortly after the creation of American Graphophone, Jesse H. Lippincott used nearly $1 million of an inheritance to gain control of it, as well as the rights to the Graphophone and the Bell and Tainter patents. He directly invested $200,000 into American Graphophone, and agreed to purchase 5,000 machines yearly, in return for sales rights to the Graphophone (except in Virginia, Delaware, and the District of Columbia).

Soon after, Lippincott purchased the Edison Speaking Phonograph Company and its patents for US$500,000, and exclusive sales rights of the Phonograph in the United States from Ezrah T. Gilliand (who had previously been granted the contract by Edison) for $250,000, leaving Edison with the manufacturing rights. . He then created the North American Phonograph Company in 1888 to consolidate the national sales rights of both the Graphophone and the Edison Speaking Phonograph.

Jesse Lippincott set up a sales network of local companies to lease Phonographs and Graphophones as dictation machines. In the early 1890s Lippincott fell victim to the unit's mechanical problems and also to resistance from stenographers, resulting in the company's bankruptcy.

A coin-operated version of the Graphophone, U.S. patent 506,348, was developed by Tainter in 1893 to compete with nickel-in-the-slot entertainment phonograph U.S. patent 428,750 demonstrated in 1889 by Louis T. Glass, manager of the Pacific Phonograph Company.

In 1889, the trade name Graphophone began to be utilized by Columbia Phonograph Company as the name for their version of the Phonograph. Columbia Phonograph Company, originally established by a group of entrepreneurs licensed by the American Graphophone Company to retail graphophones in Washington DC, ultimately acquired American Graphophone Company in 1893. The company Proceeded to make several smaller, cheaper Graphophones. Including the Columbia B in 1897 which sold over 250,000 units between 1897 and 1907. In 1904, Columbia Phonograph Company established itself in Toronto, Canada. Two years later, in 1906, the American Graphophone company reorganized and changed its name to Columbia Graphophone Company to reflect its association with Columbia. In 1918, Columbia Graphophone Company reorganized to form a retailer, Columbia Graphophone Company—and a manufacturer, Columbia Graphophone Manufacturing Company. In 1923, Louis Sterling bought Columbia Phonograph Co. and reorganized it yet again, giving birth to the future record giant Columbia Records.

Early machines compatible with Edison cylinders were modified treadle machines. The upper-works connected to a spring or electric motor (called Type K electric) in a boxy case, which could record and play back the old Bell and Tainter cylinders. Some models, like the Type G, had new upper-works that were not designed to play Bell and Tainter cylinders. The name Graphophone was used by Columbia (for disc machines) into the 1920s or 1930s, and the similar name Grafonola was used to denote internal horn machines.

== See also ==
- Columbia Graphophone Company, one of the earliest gramophone companies in the United Kingdom
- Howe Machine Factory
- List of phonograph manufacturers
- Volta Laboratory and Bureau
- Charles A. Cheever
