= Dan W. Quinn =

American recording artist

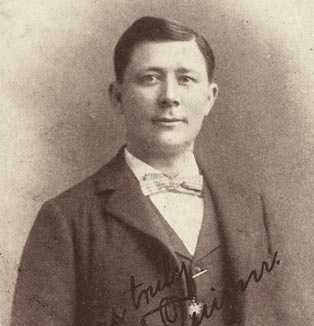
- Quinn, c. 1896

Background information
- Born: Daniel William Quinn c. 1859; New York City, U.S.
- Died: November 7, 1938 (aged 79) New York City, U.S.
- Genres: Ragtime
- Occupation: Recording artist

Daniel William Quinn (c. 1859 – November 7, 1938) was an American tenor. He was one of the first American singers to become popular in the new medium of recorded music. Quinn was a very successful recording artist whose career spanned from 1892 to 1918. Quinn recorded many of his hits in the legendary Tin Pan Alley of New York City.

== Biography ==
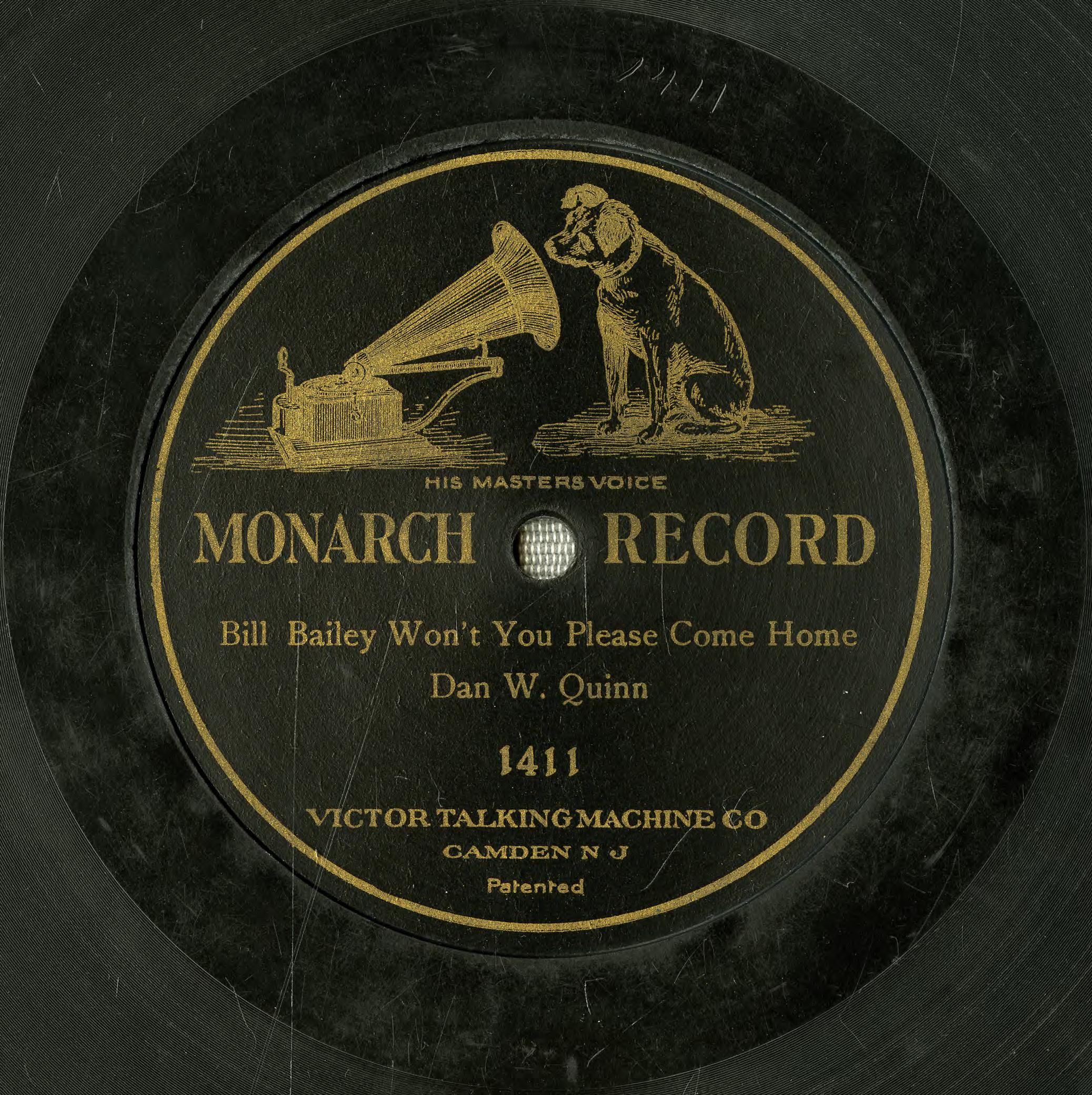
1902 Victor Monarch recording of Quinn performing "Bill Bailey, Won't You Please Come Home?"

Dan W. Quinn was born in 1859 or 1860 in New York City to Benjamin Bernard and Sabina Leonora Quinn (née Wilds). (Note: His obituary in Variety gives his birthplace as New York.) His family moved to San Francisco when he was a child, but returned to New York in the 1870s (leading to later confusion as to his birthplace). His musical career was most likely influenced by his immediate family. His older brother by four years, John, (aged 14 at the time) was listed in a June 1870 census list as a “Drummer”. He began singing in the choir of the Church of the Heavenly Rest (Episcopal) as a child. As a young adult, he worked as an ironworker and moonlighted as a singer at local functions in the New York area.

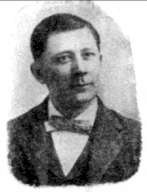
Quinn, 1895

‘Discovered’ at one of these functions in January 1892, Quinn made his first recording in New York and quickly achieved success. Limitations of technology at the time meant that not all voices were suitable to be recorded; Quinn's voice was one that recorded well. He assisted Thomas Edison in the laboratory as Edison made modifications to the talking machine, to make it also a singing machine. Edison described him as "the man with the perfect voice." He sang for all the major record labels of his day, including Berliner, Columbia, Edison, Gramophone, Paramount and Victor. In 1898, Columbia signed him to a year-long exclusive contract, but within days of its expiration he was making a record for Berliner. Over his career, Quinn recorded many popular songs and cut an estimated 2,500 titles. He sang "Molly and I and the Baby" more than a thousand times in about two weeks, using the pre-electrical acoustical-recording technology of the early 1890s: the singer sang into the large end of a horn, which physically stimulated the stylus on the rotating cylinder. The companies had limited duplication capability, so if they wanted a hundred copies, the singer had to perform the song many times, a process called recording ‘in the round’ because of the placement of the recording machines in a semi-circle around the performer(s). For one take, Edison obtained an orchestra to accompany Quinn and kept that copy in his laboratory.

At age 22 Quinn married 15-year-old Mary Jane Ritchie, known to the family as Jennie. They had six children: Dan Jr, Ritchie, Arthur (who died in infancy), Mary, known as Lidie (later Hunsberger), Jane (Manderson), and Frank. They lived in a reconstructed mansion on West 20th Street, near 10th Avenue, until about 1898, when they moved to 442 West 24th Street, in a row of two-story houses known as Chelsea cottages. Later, in response to Jennie's inability to use stairs due to worsening rheumatism, they moved to a flat at 312 West 20th Street. Quinn retired from recording in 1906 but continued to work in vaudeville, clubs, concerts, and occasionally comic opera. He briefly returned to recording from 1915 to 1918, but went back into retirement soon after. Although retired from singing, he worked extensively booking concerts and shows, including two large ones held the week he died.

Dan Quinn died of intestinal cancer at the West 20th Street apartment in New York on November 7, 1938, at age 79.

== Selected recordings ==
The following is a partial list of Dan W. Quinn's recordings:

- "Daddy Wouldn't Buy Me a Bow-wow" – North American Phonograph Co., 1892
- "The Bowery" – North American Phonograph Co., 1892
- "Daisy Bell" – North American Phonograph Co., 1893
- "And Her Golden Hair was Hanging Down Her Back" – Berliner, 1894
- "My Pearl is a Bowery Girl" – Berliner, 1894
- "Girl Wanted" – Berliner, 1895
- Henrietta, Have You Met Her?" — Columbia, 1895
- "The Band Played On" – Columbia, 1895
- "The Sidewalks of New York" – Berliner, 1895
- "Streets of Cairo" – Berliner, 1895
- "Down in Poverty Row" – Berliner, 1896
- "Elsie From Chelsea" – Edison, 1896
- "In the Baggage Coach Ahead" – Berliner, 1896
- "I've Been Hoodoed" – Berliner, 1896
- "McKinley is our Man" – Phonograph Records, 1896
- "My Best Girl's a New Yorker" – Berliner, 1896
- "The Little Lost Child" – Columbia, 1896
- "A Hot Time in the Old Town" – Berliner, 1897
- "My Mother was a Lady" – Columbia, 1897
- "There's a Little Star Shining for You" – Edison, 1897
- "You're Not the Only Pebble on the Beach" – Berliner, 1897
- "At a Georgia Camp Meeting" – Columbia, 1898
- "She Never Did the Same Thing Twice" – Berliner, 1898
- "She was Happy Til She Met You" – Columbia, 1898
- "Curse of the Dreamer" – Columbia, 1899
- "Glorious Beer" – Columbia, 1899
- "Little Old New York is Good Enough for Me" – Berliner, 1899
- "Smokey Mokes" – Edison, 1899
- "Whistling Rufus" – Edison, 1899
- "Just Because She Made Dem Goo-Goo Eyes" – Victor, 1900
- "Nothing's Too Good for the Irish" – Columbia, 1900
- "Strike Up the Band" – Victor, 1900
- "When Reuben Comes to Town" – Victor, 1900
- "Good Morning Carrie" – Victor, 1901
- "She's Getting More Like the White Folks Every Day" – Columbia, 1901
- "I Ain't A-goin' to Weep No More" – Victor, 1901
- "I Want to Go to Morrow" – Edison, 1902
- "More Work for the Undertaker" - Edison, 1902
- "Bill Bailey, Won't You Please Come Home?" – Victor, 1902
- The Penny Whistler — Columbia, 1903
- "Football" – Victor, 1905
- "Is Marriage a Failure?" (Duet with Helen Trix) – Victor, 1906
- "Hello Boys I'm Back Again" – Columbia, 1915
- "At the Fountain of Youth" – Columbia, 1916
- "Here Comes the Groom" – Operaphone Records, 1917
- "Life is a Merry Go Round" – Paramount, 1918
- "Round Her Neck She Wears a Yellow Ribbon" – Paramount, 1918
