= North American Phonograph Company =

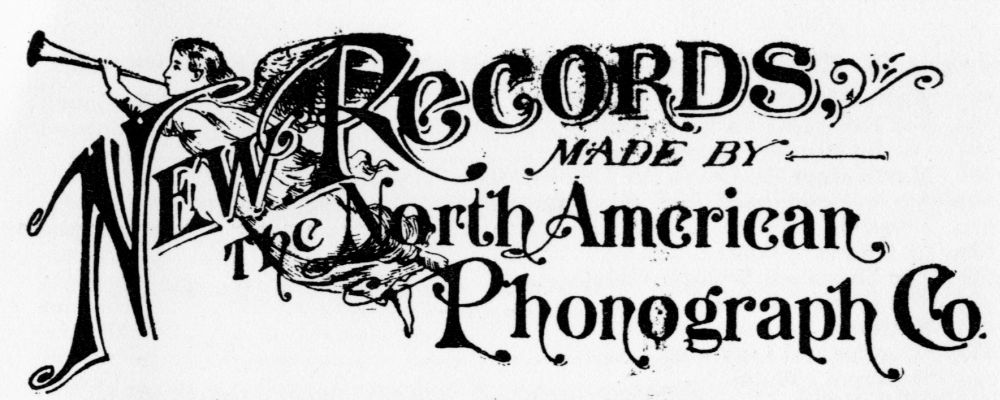
- Founded: 1888; 137 years ago
- Founder: Jesse Lippincott
- Status: Dissolved in 1896
- Location: New York City, New York, United States

The North American Phonograph Company was an early attempt to commercialize the maturing technologies of sound recording in the late 1880s and early 1890s. Though the company was largely unsuccessful in its goals due to legal, technical and financial problems, it set the stage for the modern recording industry in the mid-1890s.

== Background ==
Thomas Edison successfully demonstrated sound recording and reproduction in late 1877 with the tinfoil Phonograph. The invention caught the public's attention but its practical utility was limited due to low-fidelity and its single-use nature. Edison sold the rights to the Phonograph to the Edison Speaking Phonograph Company in 1878 and shifted his focus to the development of electric light.

Between 1880 and 1885, Alexander Graham Bell and his associates at the Volta Laboratory experimented with a variety of processes for improved sound recording. They eventually settled on a recording process based on cutting wax cylinders. On January 6, 1886, the associates formed the Volta Graphophone company and were awarded a patent on their wax cylinder process. Later in the year, Edison resumed research on the Phonograph. On March 28, 1887, the Volta associates established the American Graphophone Company for the manufacturing and sale of Graphophones, and Edison organized the Edison Phonograph Company in the following year to protect his new research in sound.

=== Incorporation ===
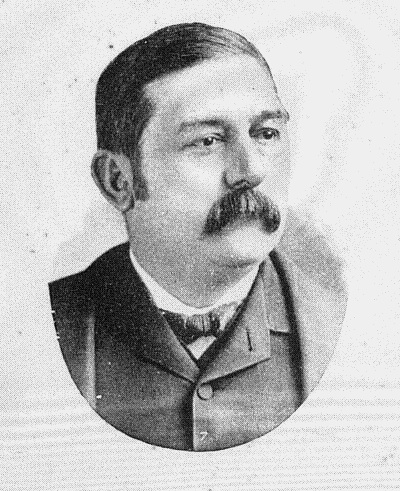
Jesse H. Lippincott, founder of the North American Phonograph Company.

In 1888, a Pennsylvania businessman named Jesse Lippincott sought to market the budding technologies for business dictation. He licensed the Graphophone patents in March, and the phonograph in June. In July, Lippincott chartered the North American Phonograph Company in Jersey City, New Jersey. Edison founded the Edison Phonograph Works for phonograph manufacture, and American Graphophone opened a factory in Bridgeport Connecticut for Graphophone manufacture. Based on the model of the Bell Telephone Company, North American would buy Phonographs and Graphophones and lease them to regional sub-companies, who would in turn rent the machines to local businesses for dictation.

=== Patent challenges ===
Before Lippincott could establish these sub-companies, the Edison Speaking Phonograph Company, who held Edison's tinfoil Phonograph patents, threatened legal action against North American, claiming rights to Edison's improvements to the Phonograph until 1912. Lippincott settled with the company, spending hundreds of thousands of dollars that were intended for capital investment.

Between 1889 and 1891, thirty-four regional sub-companies were formed, and licensed exclusive territorial rights from North American. To fund manufacture, Lippincott also needed to sell stock in the parent company, but investors were wary due to the news of the Edison Speaking Phonograph Company's protests.

Throughout 1889, manufacture of Phonograph and Graphophones was limited by North American's lack of capital. Local companies found that the few machines they leased were unreliable and hard to use. Some companies found that it was more profitable to publicly exhibit entertainment recordings (music, stories, jokes) than to rent the machines.

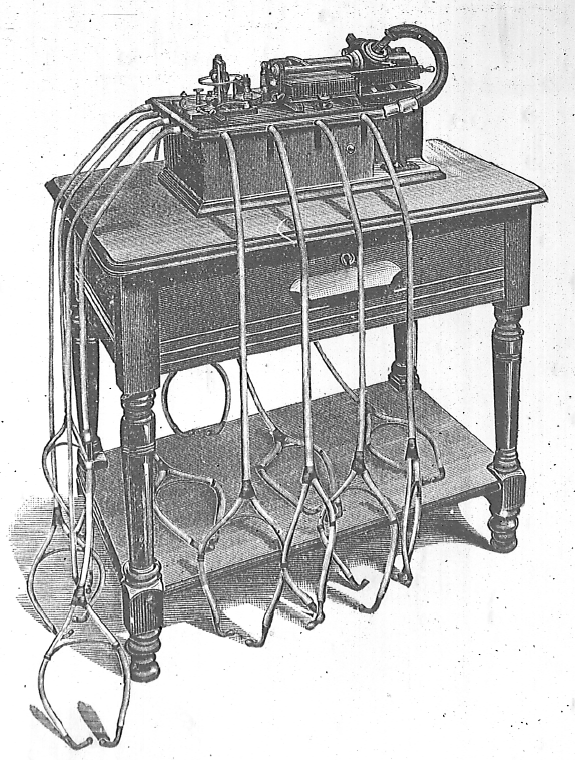
Edison Exhibition Phonograph

=== The coin-slot business ===
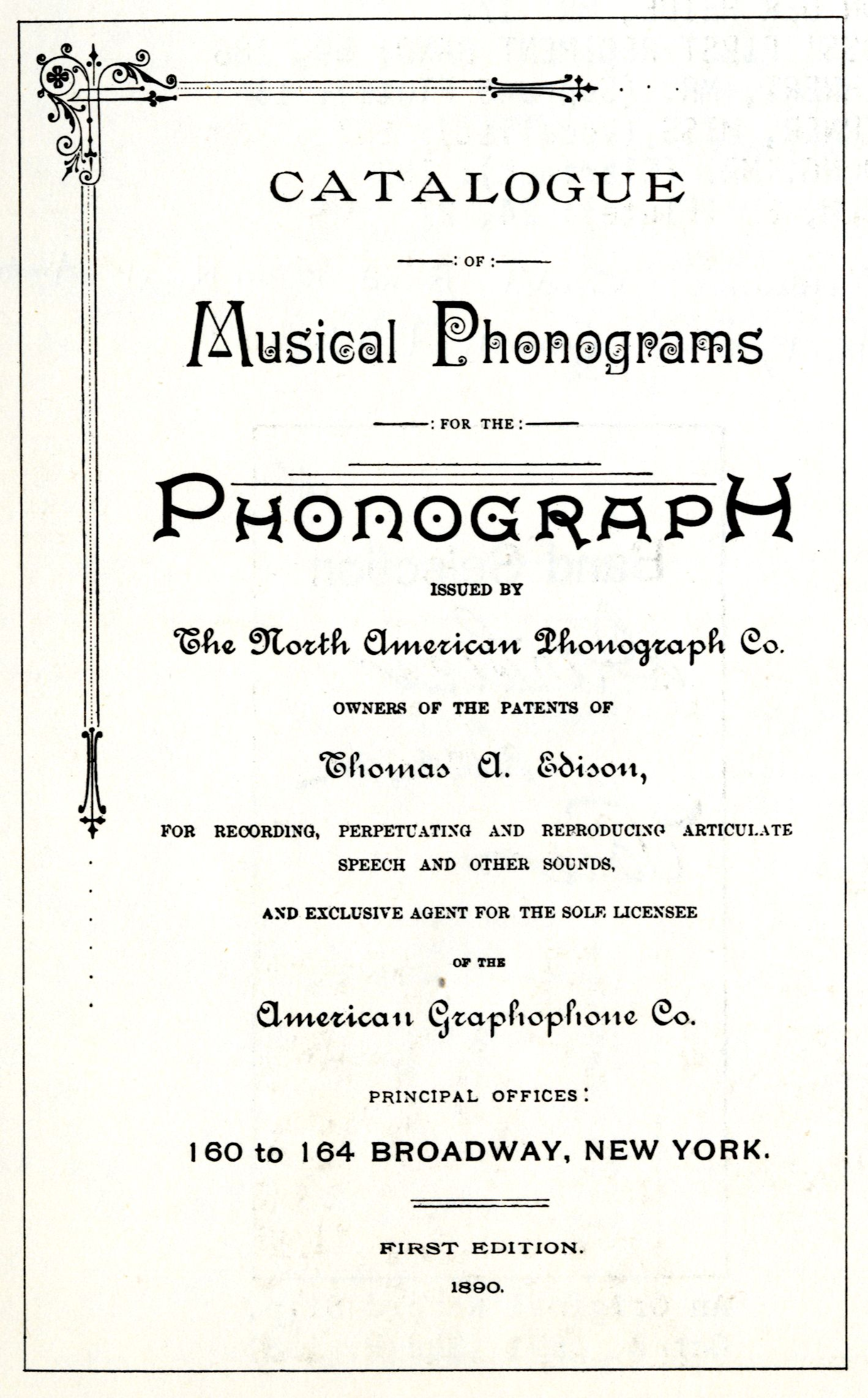
The title page of North American Phonograph Company's first catalog, 1890

In February 1890, the Automatic Phonograph Exhibition Company formed, with a patent on a device that let companies exhibit Phonographs with a coin-slot attachment, like a jukebox. Through 1890, companies began realizing that entertainment was better business than dictation, and the automatic machine was the most effective way to accomplish this. North American, realizing that this was the future, signed an agreement with Automatic in April allowing the local companies to do business with them.

As the automatic exhibition model gained ground, American Graphophone's dictation-optimized format (colloquially 'Bell-Tainter cylinders' today) fell suddenly behind. Lippincott's initial agreement with American Graphophone committed North American to buy 5,000 graphophones each year, and pay a royalty of $20 on each. Realizing they wouldn't be able to sell these unpopular machines, North American's board of directors offered to pay American Graphophone $100,000 each year (the equivalent of royalties on 5,000 machines) to disclaim them of their previously committed order.

By the end of 1890, North American was deeply in debt to the Edison Phonograph Works, and was missing the income generated by Automatic's coin-slot business. In December, North American instructed the local companies that they were expected to offer Phonographs and Graphophones for sale to the public. The Automatic Phonograph Exhibition Company filed an injunction on the same date, arguing that unrestricted sale would damage their business, and citing their April agreement allowing them to operate in this way. The temporary injunction was allowed in Dec. 1890, and made permanent Jan. 1891.

In May 1891, North American was forced into assignment (an alternative to bankruptcy) for its inability to pay Edison Phonograph Works. In July, the Automatic company agreed to allow North American to sell 1,000 machines to pay off debts, with the agreement that they were not to be sold for automatic exhibition. Lippincott had taken leave from the company in late 1890 due to illness, and in late 1891, Samuel Insull became president and Edison joined the board of directors to help repair the company's finances.

=== Edison becomes president ===
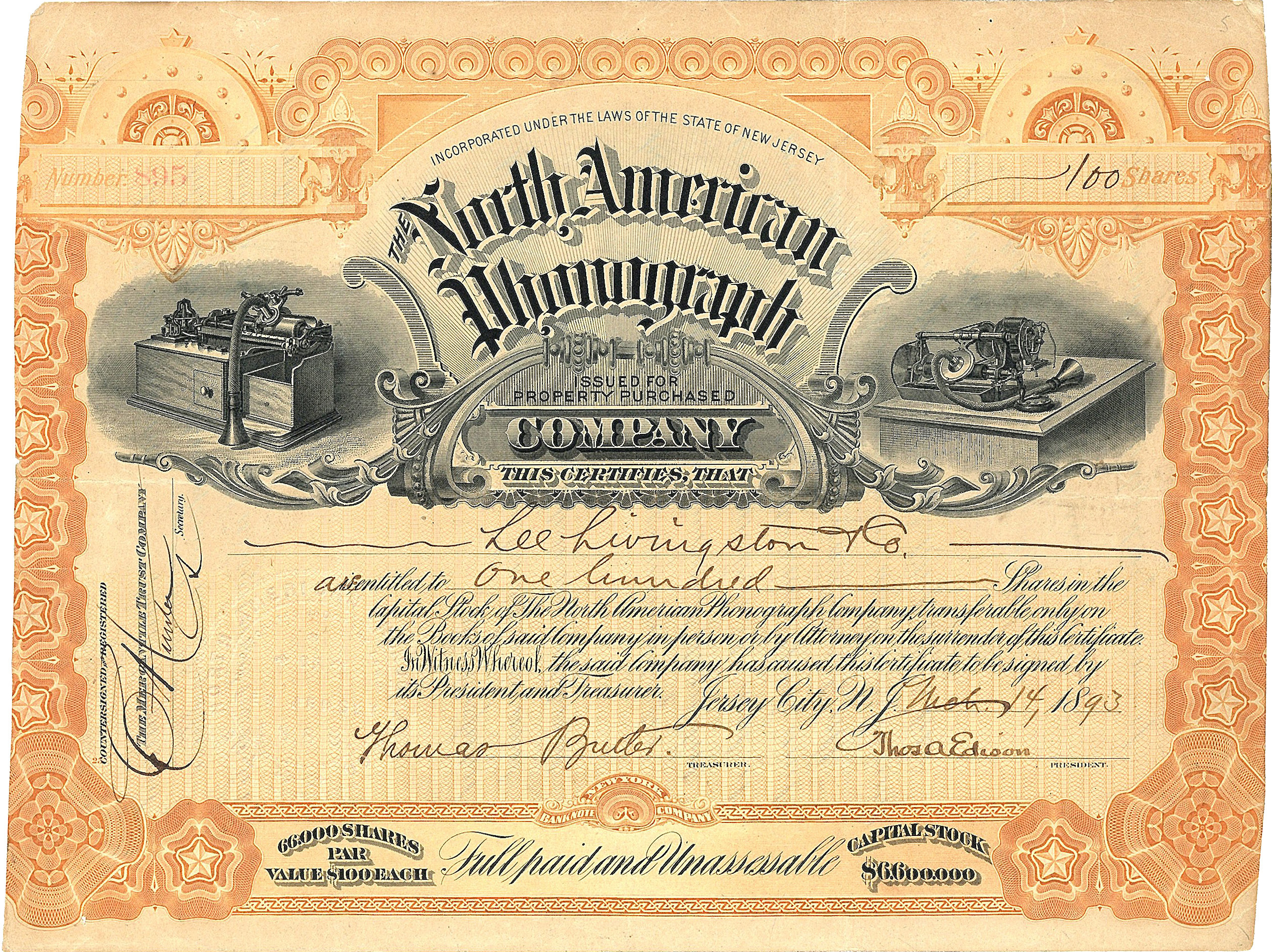
Stock certificate of the North American Phonograph Company, issued March 14, 1893 in Jersey City, N.J., originally signed by Thomas Alva Edison as president. The illustration on the left shows an Edison Class M Electric Phonograph; on the right is an 1888 American Graphophone Company Model B treadle Graphophone for wax cylinders.

In 1892, North American was still struggling to pay its debts when a series of financial measures were taken. In June, the company issued bonds to ease the liquidity crisis. In July, Edison was named president of North American. Automatic agreed to allow the unrestricted sale of Phonographs, and North American offered a deal with the local companies to centralize sales, paying a 10% royalty to the locals for their territorial rights. Most of the local companies accepted this offer.

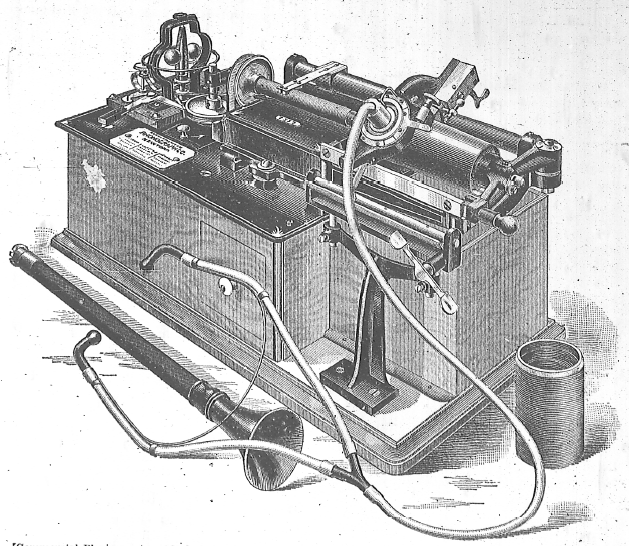
Edison Dictation Phonograph, 1893

Through 1893, North American, under Edison, continued to sell Phonographs, and offered the option to buy the machines on the installment plan. Edison planned to carry on with the business in this way for another year (from June 1893), then planned to consolidate his interests in manufacture and sales.

=== United injunction and receivership ===
In November 1893, the Edison United Phonograph Company, who held exclusive rights to market the Phonograph in England, were granted an injunction against North American for allowing the local companies to sell the machines in England, in violation of their exclusive rights.

Edison stepped down as president of North American in January 1894. In April, North American's founder Jesse Lippincott died. This allowed American Graphophone, who had licensed their manufacturing rights to Lippincott personally, to sell Graphophones directly to the public. The Edison Phonograph Works demanded payment on North American's outstanding debts in June. In August, North American, unable to pay their debts to Edison or their bondholders, was forced into receivership. In October, American Graphophone issued a statement to the industry saying Edison's Phonographs, which had incorporated American's patents while both parties were licensed by North American, infringed on their rights and could not be legally sold.

Throughout 1895, Edison tried to buy North American's assets to recover his Phonograph patents and resume manufacture and sale. Other creditors of North American blocked the purchase, worried that Edison would not have to pay their debts if the sale proceeded. In the same year, American Graphophone acquired the Columbia Phonograph Company, one of the strongest regional sub-companies of North American. They debuted the spring-motor powered 'Type N' Graphophone, which gracefully resolved one of the most fundamental problems of previous Graphophones.

=== National Phonograph Company ===
In 1896, the court in charge of the North American receivership let Edison buy North American's assets, with the condition that he also accept North American's liabilities. Edison formed the National Phonograph Company in January 1896, and transferred North American's patents and supplies to this company. Edison and National Phonograph fought American Graphophone and Columbia Phonograph in court over patents throughout 1896. When the judge in charge of this case died in December 1896, the warring parties agreed to cross-license each-others patents, and let the phonograph business begin in earnest in 1897.

=== Resolution ===
Beginning in 1897, Edison and Columbia sustained a thriving competition in spring-powered home phonographs and wax cylinder records. Edison continued with cylinder records, debuting the mass-producible Gold-Moulded cylinder in 1902, while Columbia transitioned to the disc format from 1901 to 1908 and entered into more direct competition with the Victor Talking Machine Company, which had inherited the disc business from Berliner's Gramophone.

The North American Phonograph Company finally dissolved in June 1898 after Edison settled with the Edison United company. Some local phonograph companies filed suits against Edison over the years, even threatening a class-action suit in 1900 before their original contracts were to expire. Minor battles continued until April 1909, when National Phonograph acquired the New York Phonograph Company. The Columbia Phonograph Company, General (the portion of the business incorporated as a part of North American) voluntarily dissolved in June 1913.

== See also ==
Charles A. Cheever
