= Andrew B. Sterling =

American lyricist (1874–1955)

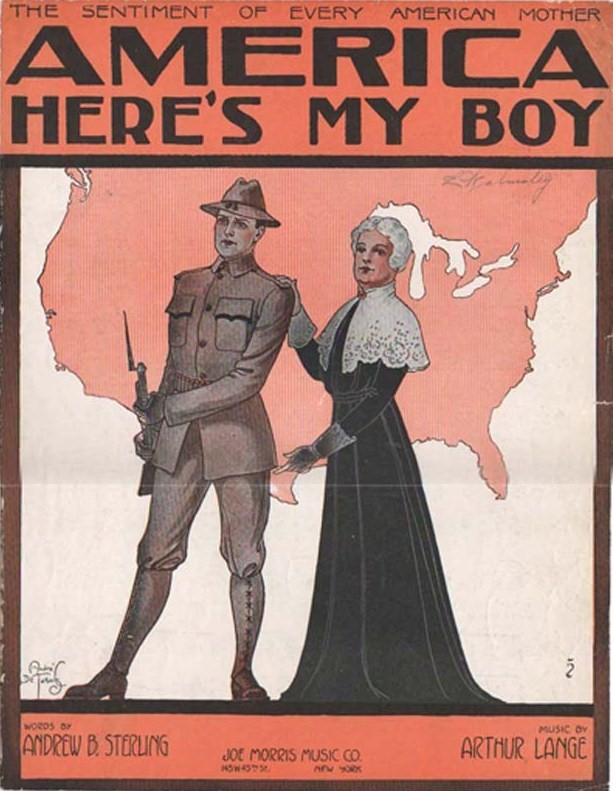
Sheet music cover, 1917

Andrew Benjamin Sterling (August 26, 1874 – August 11, 1955) was an American lyricist.

== Biography ==
Born in New York City, he began writing songs and vaudevilles after he graduated from high school. An important event was his meeting with the composer Harry Von Tilzer in 1898—the two began a songwriting partnership thereafter, lasting almost 30 years.

Others that Sterling collaborated with include Arthur Lange, Gus Edwards, Bernie Grossman, M. K. Jerome, William Jerome, Frederick Allen Mills, his brother Raymond Sterling, Ray Henderson, Edward Moran and Bartley Costello.

Sterling wrote the songs "Meet Me in St. Louis, Louis" in 1904 and "Wait 'Till the Sun Shines, Nellie" in 1905. He wrote the song "America, Here's My Boy" for the Peerless Quartet in 1917, in the aftermath of U.S. entry into World War I in April 1917. He wrote "On the Old Fall River Line" with Von Tilzer and W. Jerome. He worked with Von Tilzer on the classic "Pick Me Up and Lay Me Down in Dear Old Dixieland". Other songs for which Sterling wrote the lyrics in whole or part include "After the War is Over" (1918) and "When My Baby Smiles at Me" (1920).

Sterling died in Stamford, Connecticut, on August 11, 1955.

He was inducted into the Songwriters Hall of Fame in 1970.

== Selected works ==
- with Von Tilzer, "My Old New Hampshire Home", 1898
- with Arthur Lange, "A Mother's Prayer for Her Boy Out There", New York: Joe Morris Music Co, 1917. OCLC 892504792
- with Arthur Lange, "America, Here's My Boy", New York: Joe Morris Music Co, 1917. OCLC 9892806
- with Von Tilzer and W. Jerome, "On the Old Fall River Line"
- with Von Tilzer, "Pick Me Up and Lay Me Down in Dear Old Dixieland"
- with Von Tilzer, "Under the American Flag". New York: Harry Von Tilzer Music Pub. Co, 1915. OCLC 40708342
- with Von Tilzer, "Wait 'till the Sun Shines, Nellie", 1905
- with Arthur Lange, "What'll We Do with Him Boys?" New York: Joe Morris Music Co., 1918. OCLC 40913604
- with Arthur Lange, Bernie Grossman, and Starmer, "We're Going Over the Top". New York: Joe Morris Music Co, 1918. OCLC 47374626
- with Von Tilzer, "You'll Have to Put Him to Sleep with the Marseillaise and Wake Him Up with a Oo-La-La". New York: Harry Von Tilzer Music Co., 1918. OCLC 892505011
- with Charles B Ward, "Strike Up The Band (Here Comes a Sailor)"
