= My Old New Hampshire Home =

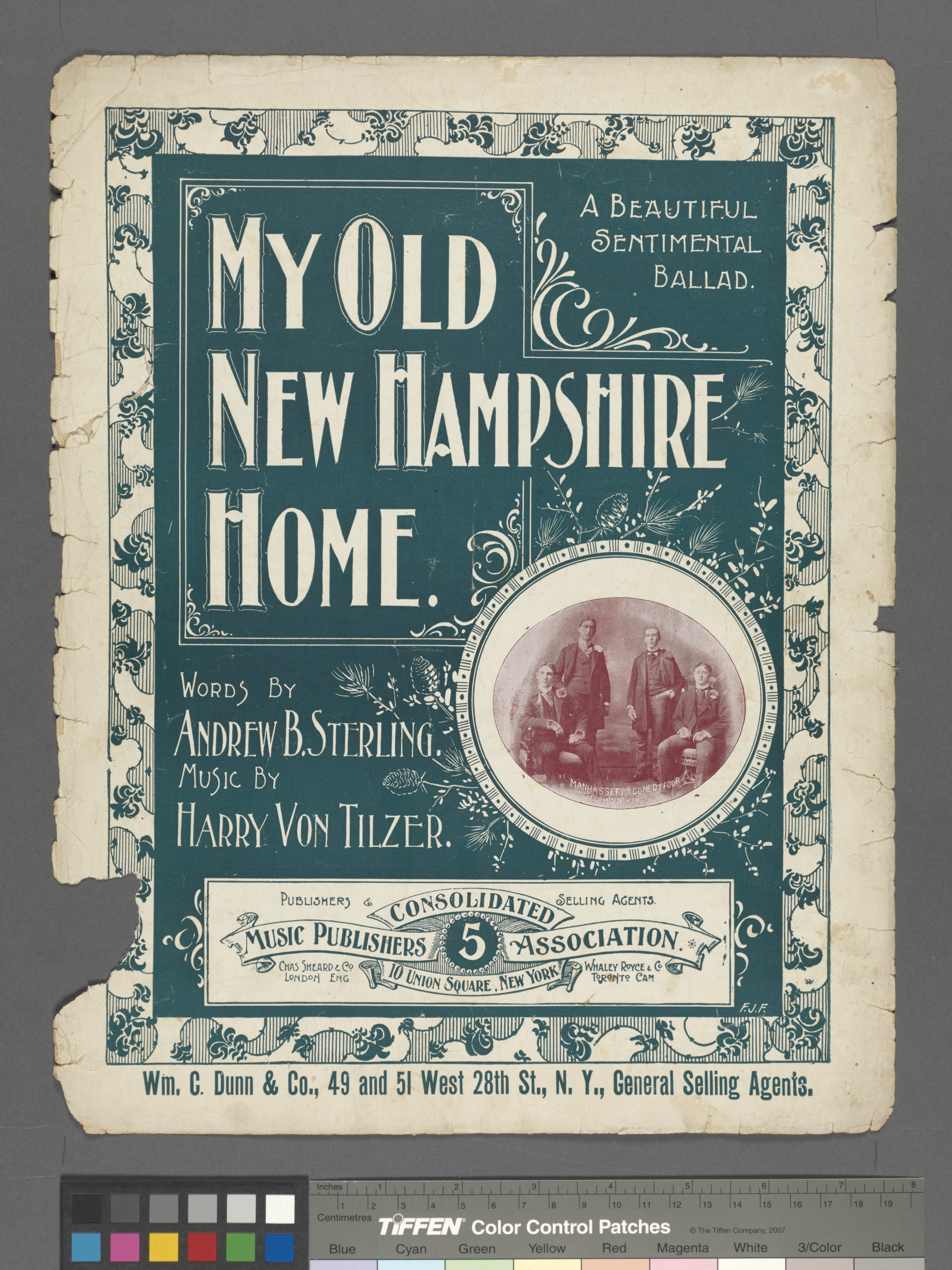
- Sheet music cover page

Song
- Language: English
- Published: 1898
- Songwriter: Andrew B. Sterling
- Composer: Harry Von Tilzer

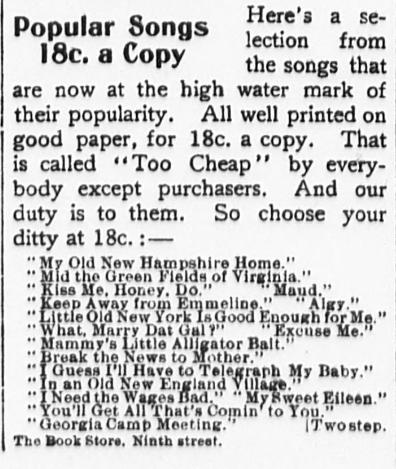
Advertisement for popular sheet music in the New York Sun on March 3, 1899, with "My Old New Hampshire Home" listed first

"My Old New Hampshire Home" is an 1898 song that was the first popular hit of composer Harry Von Tilzer, with lyrics by Andrew B. Sterling.

In 1898, Von Tilzer and Sterling were sharing a rented furnished room in New York City on Fifteenth Street. They were three weeks behind on their rent, and used a final rent bill slipped under their door to write the lyrics to a new song. The following day they shopped it to places on Union Square with no luck. Bartley Costello, who was a lyricist himself, told them to take it to new publisher William C. Dunn. They brought it to Dunn, who agreed to take it home for his daughter to play and to pay $15 for it if she liked it. The next day the authors received a check for $15.

The composition sold extremely well in sheet music, as well as in phonograph recordings, and in particular a recording by popular tenor George J. Gaskin. But Von Tilzer and Sterling weren't the ones benefiting. The next year, the Dunn firm was bought by Shapiro and Bernstein primarily to get the rights to the song, and they paid the duo $4,000 in royalties, and made Von Tilzer a partner.

The song was a big hit of its day. It has been reported in a number of sources that the sheet music for the song sold over two million copies. This may be an exaggeration, however. In 1902, it was reported that Von Tilzer had sold two million copies of all his songs to date (which would have included the 1900 hit "A Bird in a Gilded Cage"), including 360,000 copies of "My Old New Hampshire Home". Some sources peg the sales at "over" one million.

The song was recorded a number of times. Music historian Joel Whitburn has opined that the 1899 recording by George J. Gaskin was the top hit of the decade for 1890s recordings.

== Lyrics ==
Verse 1
Far away on the hills of old New Hampshire,
Many years ago we parted, Ruth and I;
By the stream where we wandered in the gloaming,
It was there I kissed my love a sad goodbye
She clung to me and trembled when I told her,
And pleadingly she begged of me to stay;
We parted, and I left her broken hearted,
In the old New Hampshire village far away.

Refrain
Now the sunshine lingers there,
And the roses bloom as fair
In the wildwood where together we would roam.
In the village churchyard near
Sleeps the one I loved so dear
On the hills of my old New Hampshire home

Verse 2
In my dreams by the stream last night I wandered,
And I thought my love was standing by my side;
Once again then I told her that I loved her,
Once again she promised she would be my bride;
And as I stooped to kiss her I awakened,
I called her, but she was not there to hear;
My heart lies buried with her 'neath the willow,
In the old New Hampshire home I love so dear.
