= You'll Have to Put Him to Sleep with the Marseillaise and Wake Him Up with a Oo-La-La =

"You'll Have to Put Him to Sleep with the Marseillaise and Wake Him Up with a Oo-la-la"
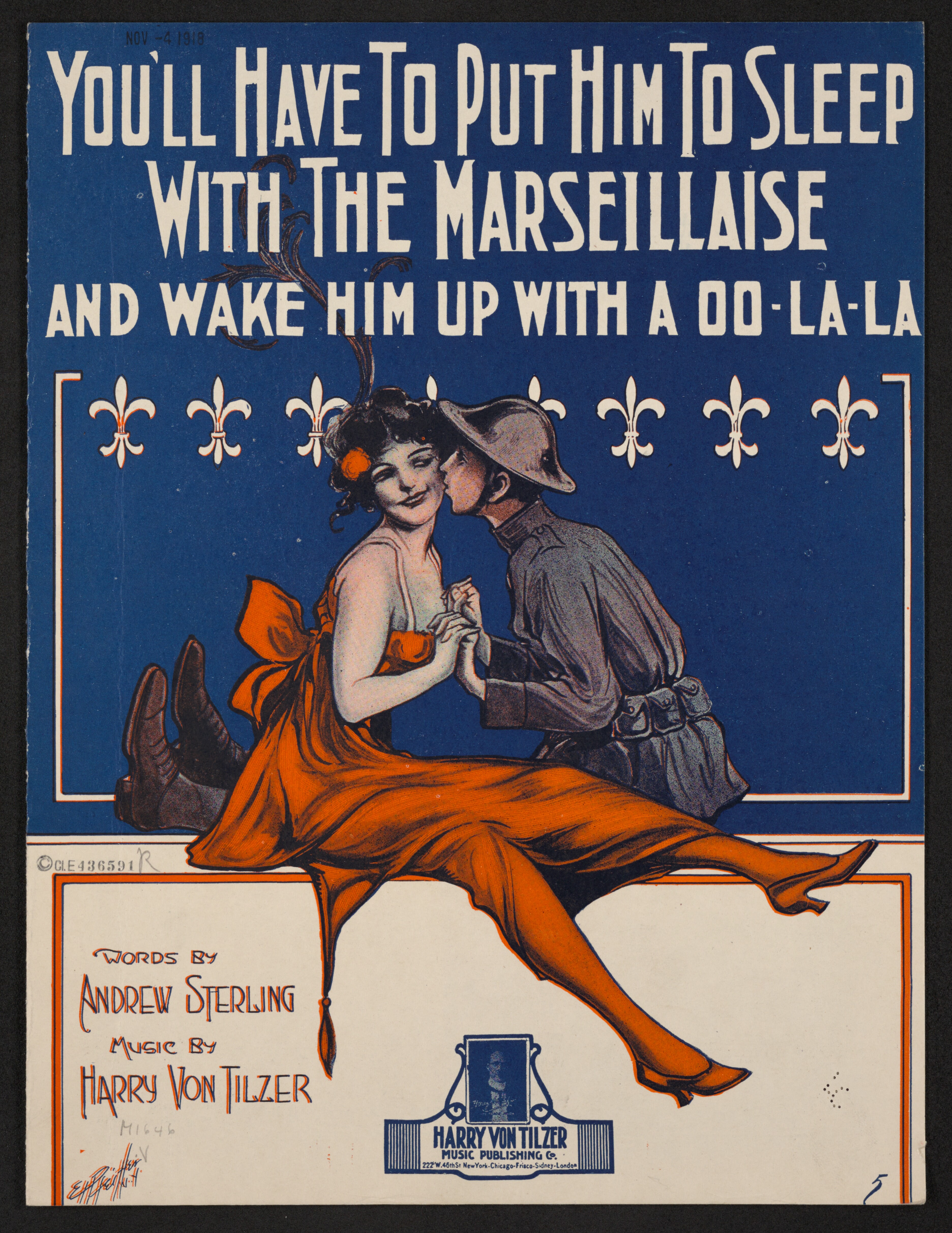
- Cover of sheet music for WWI song "You'll have to put him to sleep..."

Song
- Published: Harry Von Tizler Publishing Company
- Released: 1918
- Songwriters: Composer: Harry Von Tilzer; Lyricist: Andrew B. Sterling

"You'll Have to Put Him to Sleep with the Marseillaise and Wake Him Up with a Oo-La-La" is a World War I song written in 1918. Andrew B. Sterling wrote the lyrics, and Harry Von Tilzer composed the music. The song was produced by the Harry Von Tizler Publishing Company in New York City. On the cover of the sheet music is a soldier kissing a woman. The song was written for both voice and piano.

The lyrics relay the message to American girls that US soldiers have learned "a lot of things in France," and in order to keep men interested they should adopt French mannerisms and learn how to speak French. As the title suggests, American girls should learn "La Marseillaise", the French national anthem. The chorus reads:

You'll have to do your little parlez vous
You'll have to coo just like your French girls do
You'll have to tease in French
You'll have to squeeze in French
You'll have to la la la la
...
Because when you get through with Yankee Doodle Doo
You'll have to put him to sleep with the Marseillaise
And wake him up with a Oo-la-la
