= We're Going Over the Top =

Song
- Language: English
- Published: 1917
- Composer(s): Andrew B. Sterling, Bernie Grossman, and Arthur Lange

"We're Going Over the Top" is a World War I song written by Andrew B. Sterling, Bernie Grossman, and Arthur Lange. It was published in 1917 by Joe Morris Music Co., in New York, NY. The sheet music cover, designed by Starmer, illustrates a battlefield scene with a tank moving over the top of a trench and soldiers inside the trench getting out of the way of the tank. Behind the tank soldiers march up the field.

The sheet music can be found at the Pritzker Military Museum & Library, as well as the University of Maine.
