= City of Taunton (ship) =

Freight sidepaddle steamship

Coordinates: 41°42′35.48″N 71°10′42.58″W

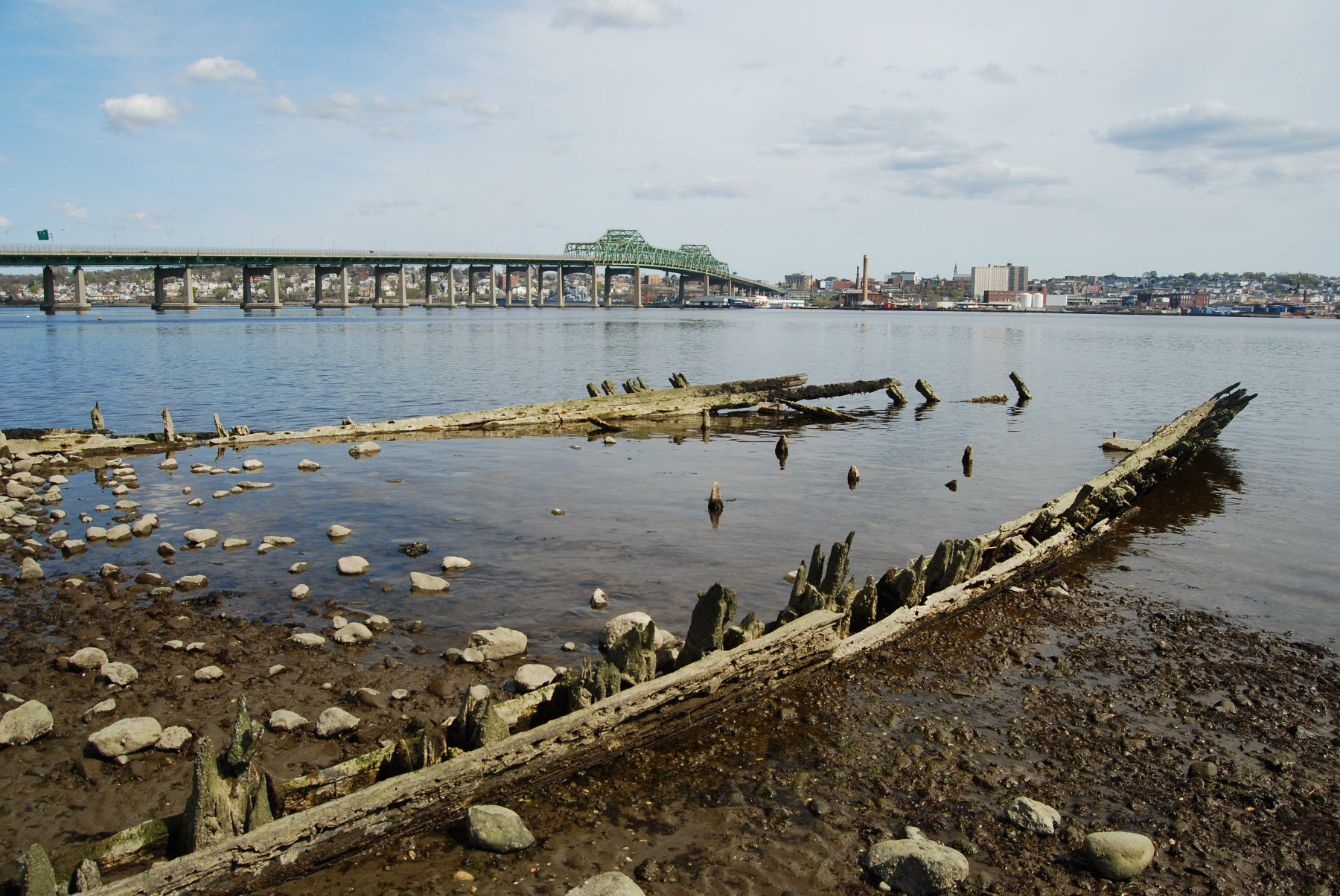
- Wreckage of the City of Taunton, Somerset, Massachusetts, April 2010

History
- Name: City of Taunton
- Operator: Fall River Line
- Builder: Montgomery & Howard
- Completed: 1892, Chelsea, Massachusetts
- Fate: Grounded at Somerset, Massachusetts

General characteristics
- Type: Cargo ship
- Length: 89 m (292 ft)
- Installed power: Paddle
- Propulsion: Steam

The City of Taunton was a freight sidepaddle steamship that sailed for the Fall River Line. She was built in 1892 in Chelsea, Massachusetts by the Montgomery & Howard shipyard. Her wreckage still lies on the shores of Mount Hope Bay in Somerset, Massachusetts, and is easily visible at low tide.

== The Ship ==
The City of Taunton was one of several freight steamers of the Fall River Line, along with the City of Brockton, City of Fall River, City of New Bedford, and the City of Fitchburg. The ships of the freight steamer fleet were considerably less ornate than the famous passenger ships of the Line, which were often referred to as floating palaces.

== Wreck with the City of Plymouth ==
Just after midnight of March 21, 1903, the City of Taunton collided with the City of Plymouth. Both these ships steamed for the Fall River Line. The fog was so thick that the crews reported "it was difficult for the commanding officers and pilots on duty to distinguish object more than 100 feet (30 m) away." Capt. Bibber of the City of Plymouth stated, "When I found he was coming on at us I ordered the engines stopped and backed up full speed. Just at that time I saw his green light about two points on the port bow." The Taunton was damaged, and the crew filled the cracks with blankets. They were towed into New London by the Nashua. The City of Plymouth did not fare as well. When struck by the Taunton, the port side of the steel ship was ripped open, drowning four sailors. It caused an opening about 75-foot (23 m) long. It was said that "the opening ... was big enough to take in a good-sized summer cottage." In total, five crew and one passenger died on the Plymouth. US Marines that were passengers on the Plymouth were able to maintain calm and assist to the wounded. After the wreck both ships made it to port.

== The broken intake ==
On October 2, 1910, the City of Taunton experienced a break in one of its intake pipes. In the Globe it was stated that the ship "Tore across the sound to Bridgeport whistling for aid." The captain believed that the ship would sink prior to reaching the port, but they made it to dock. Firemen in Bridgeport met the ship at the dock and were able to pump the water out of the ship. There were no passengers aboard the ship during this incident.

== Final wreck location ==
In the 1930s the steamship companies had a lot of problems with the Seamen's Union. This and the switch from luxury liners to cheaper transportation as well as the closing of the cloth mills in Massachusetts caused the downfall of these great liners. In the 1930s the City of Taunton was grounded in Somerset, Massachusetts, and left to waste.
