= Under the American Flag =

Song
- Language: English
- Published: 1915
- Composer: Harry Von Tilzer
- Lyricist: Andrew B. Sterling

"Under the American Flag" is a World War I song with words by Andrew B. Sterling and music by Harry Von Tilzer. The song was first published in 1915 by Harry Von Tilzer Publishing Co. in New York, NY. The sheet music cover depicts a man hugging a woman, with an inset photograph of the composer.

The sheet music can be found at the Pritzker Military Museum & Library.
