= Von Tilzer =

Von Tilzer is a surname. Notable people with the surname include:

- Albert Von Tilzer (1878–1956), American songwriter, brother of Harry
- Harry Von Tilzer (1872–1946), American songwriter
