= Spiegle Willcox =

American jazz musician (1903–1999)

- Born: Newell Lynn Willcox; May 2, 1903; Sherburne, New York, U.S.
- Died: August 25, 1999 (aged 96) Cortland, New York, U.S.
- Genres: Jazz
- Occupation: Musician
- Instrument: Trombone
- Years active: 1923–1999

Newell Lynn "Spiegle" Willcox (May 2, 1903 – August 25, 1999 in Cortland, New York) was a jazz trombonist.

== Biography ==
Newell Willcox was born in Sherburne, New York, and learned valve trombone in his youth under the tuition of his father, Lynn Willcox, who was an amateur musician and bandleader. As a student of Manlius Military Academy, where he also played in the school's brass band, he acquired the nickname Spiegle, after one of the horses from the academy's stables which, according to his fellow students, he apparently resembled.

He switched to the more familiar slide trombone in his late teens and joined a group called The Big Four in nearby Syracuse, New York. The band came to the notice of an aspiring young bandleader, Paul Whiteman, who first joined the group and then took over its leadership as the Paul Whiteman Collegians, bringing them to the bigger stage of New York City itself in 1923.

Willcox made his first recordings with the Collegians and remained with Whiteman for three years, building a reputation as a skilled sight-reader with a full, richly burnished tone that complemented the leader's preference for a polished, sophisticated ensemble sound over the earthier approach associated with hot jazz bands. Willcox considered himself primarily a melody player rather than an improvising jazz soloist.

He returned to Cortland for a time after leaving the band in 1925, but was quickly in demand and played briefly with The California Ramblers, replacing Tommy Dorsey, the Charles Dieseroth Orchestra, and the Henry Thies Orchestra (again replacing Tommy Dorsey), before joining the popular Jean Goldkette Orchestra, where, yet again, he replaced Tommy Dorsey. Shortly after, cornetist Bix Beiderbecke and saxophonist Frankie Trumbauer also joined the band, making it one of the stellar ensembles of the day.

In 1927, and with a family to raise, the trombonist opted for the greater certainties of joining his father's coal business rather than pursuing the life of a professional musician. He continued to lead an amateur group in local functions on weekends in the Syracuse area and did so for almost half a century.

In 1975, Willcox was invited to take part in a reunion concert for the Goldkette band at Carnegie Hall, where he renewed acquaintance with violinist Joe Venuti. Venuti persuaded the trombonist, now retired from the coal business, to join him on a series of club engagements, and they worked together until the violinist's death in 1978, by which time Willcox had firmly re-established himself on the music scene.

He began to play regularly in the US, including many appearances at the celebrated Sacramento Jazz Jubilee, and was a regular visitor to Europe. In addition, he made some appearances with Vince Giordano's Nighthawks Orchestra. He also made a rare venture into the recording studio with a group of Dutch musicians in Amsterdam in 1994. The resulting disc was released under the appropriate title of Jazz Keeps You Young, even though, at the age of 91, it probably made him the oldest trombonist ever to record.

At least until he died (and possibly after that) Spiegle Willcox held the world record for the longest recording career (76 years) of any musician that ever lived (the record is held today by Stranger Malone); his first records were made in 1923 while his last performance, with an Italian jazz band, was recorded and issued on CD in 1999.

In 1995, he won the Benny Carter Award of the American Federation of Jazz Societies. He reminisced on his experiences with Beiderbecke for the documentary film Bix in 1981, and can be heard discussing his life and music in a major television documentary series on jazz produced by filmmaker Ken Burns.

He is survived by two sons, Newell Jr. and Charles, daughter Cynthia, and several grandchildren and great-grandchildren.
