= It's a Long, Long Way to the U.S.A. (And the Girl I Left Behind) =

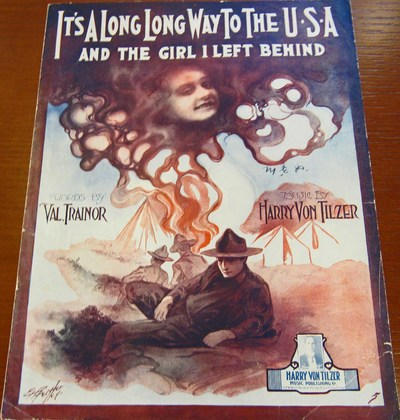
- Sheet music cover, part of the Pritzker Military Museum & Library collection

Song
- Released: January 1, 1917
- Label: Harry Von Tilzer Publishing Company
- Songwriters: Composer: Harry Von Tilzer; Lyricist: Val Trainor

"It's a Long, Long Way to the U.S.A (And the Girl I Left Behind)" is a World War I era song released in 1917. Val Trainor wrote the lyrics. Harry Von Tilzer composed the music. The song was published by Harry Von Tilzer Publishing Company of New York, New York. It was written for both voice and piano.

Edward H. Pfeiffer designed the sheet music cover. Pfeiffer illustrated more than 1,500 covers throughout his career. This one in particular featured soldiers sitting around a campfire. One of the soldiers is dreaming about a woman, whose image is seen in the smoke clouds. The title of the song was borrowed from the popular march, "It's a Long, Long Way to Tipperary."

The song was successful in 1917. It is one of Tilzer's 22 war-inspired songs. The song tells the story of a wounded soldier giving his friend a verbal message to deliver to his "little girl" and mother. It appears as though the soldier is near death as he speaks softly and says, "Night and day how I was praying her dear face once more to see." The chorus is as follows:

"It's a long, long way to U.S.A.
And the girl I left behind;
And if you get back some day,
Give my love to her and say
That her boy was true;
Tell dear mother, too,
Just to always treat her kind.
It's a long, long way to the U.S.A.
And the girl I left behind."

The sheet music can be found at Pritzker Military Museum & Library.

== Bibliography ==
- Vogel, Frederick G. World War I Songs: A History and Dictionary of Popular American Patriotic Tunes, with Over 300 Complete Lyrics. Jefferson: McFarland & Company, Inc., 1995. ISBN 0-89950-952-5
