= On the Old Fall River Line =

Single by Billy Murray
- B-side: Swing, Swing, Swing (He'd Roll His Hammock Up and Say "Good-Night!")
- Written: 1913
- Published: 1913
- Released: 1913
- Recorded: August 6, 1913
- Genre: Traditional pop
- Length: 2:27
- Label: Victor
- Composer: Harry Von Tilzer
- Lyricists: William Jerome and Andrew B. Sterling

Audio sample
- 1913 sound recording by Billy Murray: file; help

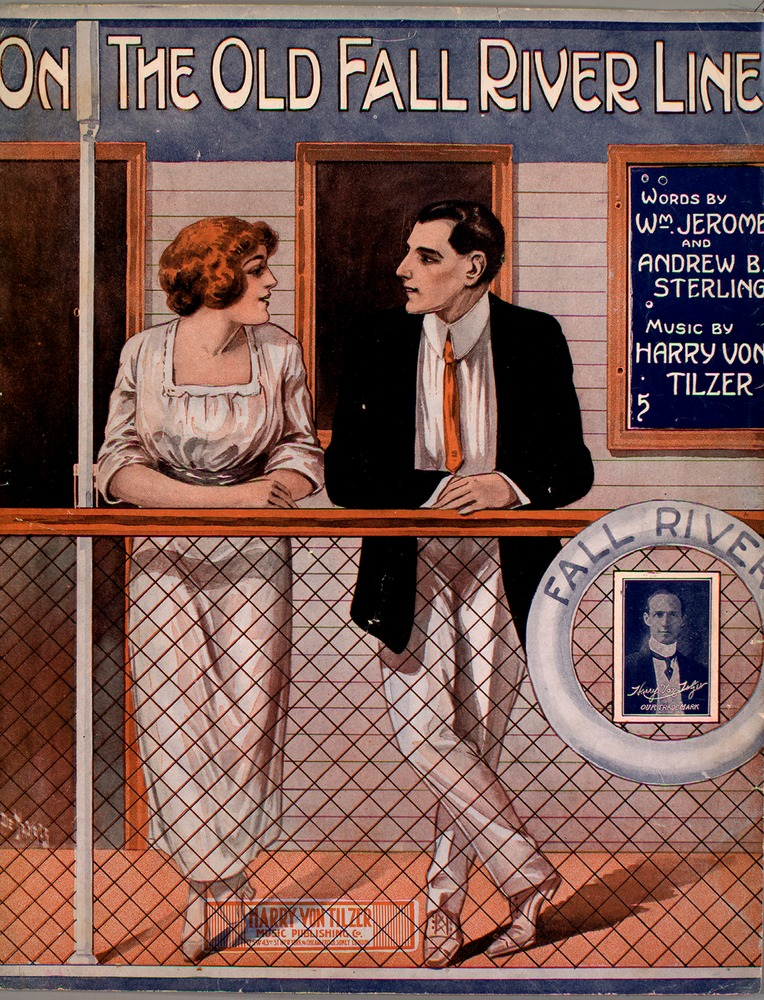
Sheet music cover, 1913

"On the Old Fall River Line" is a song composed in 1913 by William Jerome (words), Andrew B. Sterling (words) and Harry Von Tilzer (music) set on a steamship of the Fall River Line of steamships between New York and Newport, Rhode Island, which connected with trains from Newport to Boston. Von Tilzer had often traveled the line and was inspired by honeymooners "stirred to romantic depths by the alliance of shadowy darkness, twinkling stars, softly lapping waves and stately moving ships." Popular during World War I, especially among New England soldiers, it was also "much parodied." It is a cheerful, up-tempo ditty, but, typically of its time, "there is a final twist to married bliss with the final chorus line of: 'But I wish "oh Lord" I fell overboard, On the old Fall River Line.'" Described by The New York Times as "a popular song of a quarter century ago" in 1937, its full chorus was used that same year in Time Magazine's article on the passing of the old steamboat line. Although still garnering a place in Billboard's 1949 listing of "Harry Von Tilzer's Best Known Songs" as late as 1949 and being described as "a famous verse" by The Christian Science Monitor in 1950, a dozen years after the last ship had sailed, it is less remembered today, although not completely forgotten. Modern-day performers have included Steve Martin and Tiny Tim.

== Chorus ==
On the old Fall River Line
On the old Fall River Line
I fell for Susie's line of talk
And Susie fell for mine
Then we fell in with a parson
And he tied us tight as twine
But I wish 'oh Lord'
I fell over board
On the old Fall River Line

== Recordings ==
- Billy Murray, recorded 1913-08-06, Victor Talking Machine Co. B 13673. According to the Fall River Historical Society, it was "recorded entirely on location in Fall River, Massachusetts". From January 1914, appeared on US Billboard for three weeks, charting as high as #6.
- Arthur Collins and Byron G. Harlan, 1913, Columbia A1419 (see Arthur Collins, 1910s discography). From January 1914, appeared on US Billboard for four weeks, charting as high as #5.
- The Melody Men, on Barber Shop Favourites, Solitaire Manhattan Record SRO-452.
- Victor Military Band, recorded 1914-02-05, Victor 35334.
