= What'll We Do with Him Boys? (The Yanks Made a Monkey Out of You) =

1918 song written by Andrew B. Sterling and composed by Arthur Lange

Song
- Language: English
- Published: 1918
- Composer: Arthur Lange
- Lyricist: Andrew B. Sterling

"What'll We Do with Him Boys? (The Yanks Made a Monkey Out of You)" is a patriotic World War I song written by Andrew B. Sterling and composed by Arthur Lange. The song asks what Navy sailors about to depart for the war in France will do with the Kaiser once they catch him. They imagine that they will put him in a cage and send him to the zoo.

The song was first published in 1918 by Joe Morris Music Co., in New York City. The sheet music cover shows a large framed photo of an American sailor in dress whites, Petty Officer First Class W. J. Reilly, U.S. Navy. The background depicts a jungle scene with a lion, a monkey, and a man with a Kaiser mustache, presumably the Kaiser himself, sitting on a chair and scratching his head.

== Bibliography ==
- Parker, Bernard S. (2007). World War I Sheet Music. Vol. 2. Jefferson: McFarland & Company, Inc. ISBN 978-0-7864-2799-4. OCLC 71790113.
- Vogel, Frederick G. (1995). World War I Songs: A History and Dictionary of Popular American Patriotic Tunes, with Over 300 Complete Lyrics. Jefferson: McFarland & Company, Inc. ISBN 0-89950-952-5. OCLC 32241433.
