= A Mother's Prayer for Her Boy Out There =

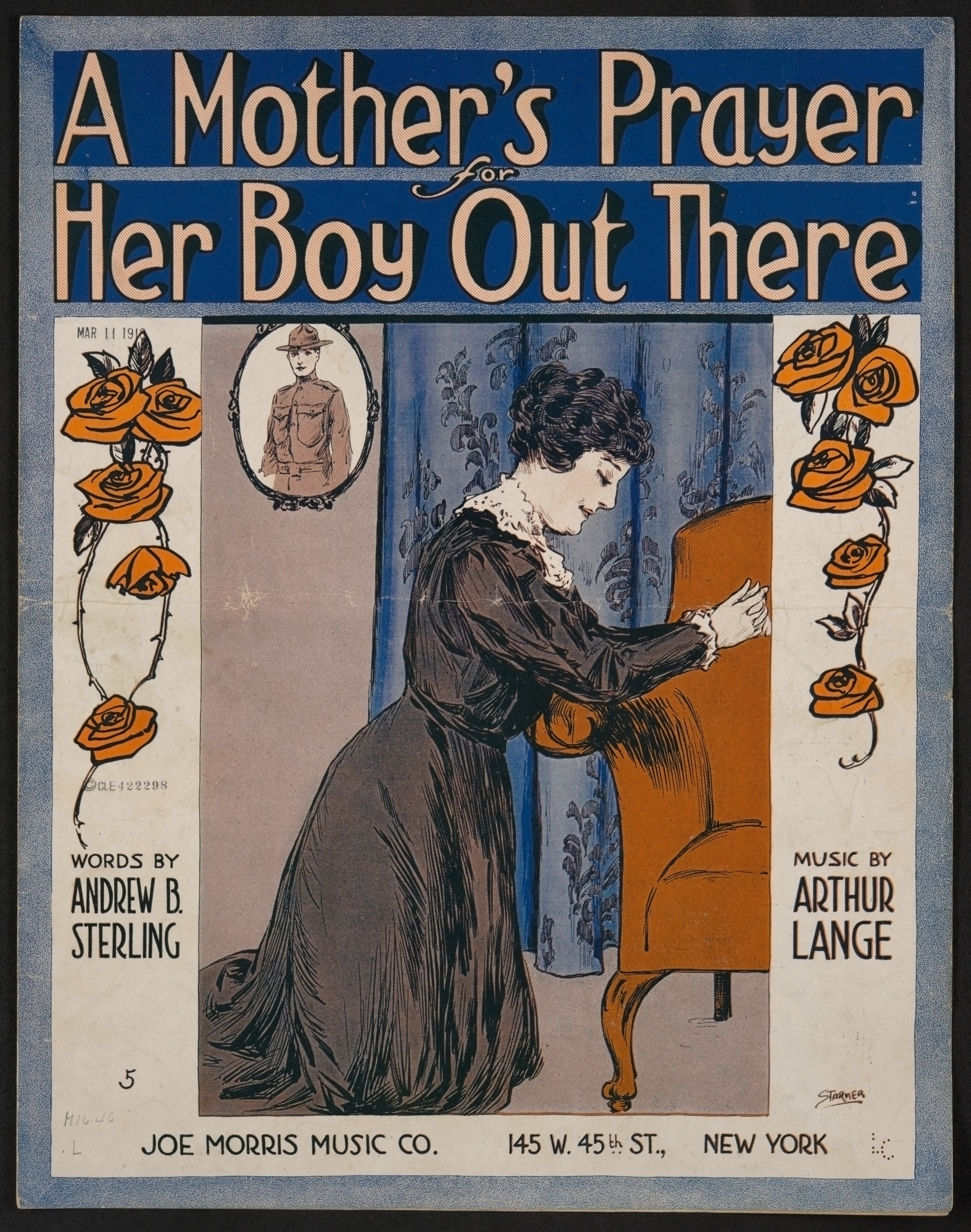
- Sheet music cover

Song
- Published: by Joe Morris Music
- Released: 1918
- Genre: World War I song
- Composer: Arthur Lange
- Lyricist: Andrew B. Sterling

"A Mother's Prayer for Her Boy Out There" is a World War I era song released in 1918. Andrew B. Sterling wrote the lyrics and Arthur Lange composed the music. It was written for voice and piano.

The song was published by Joe Morris Music Co. of New York City. On the cover is a woman kneeling down to pray, with a picture of a soldier hanging on the wall behind her.

The lyrics tell the story of a mother who is struggling with the fact that her son is fighting in war. The only way she can find solace is through prayer. It is told in from the third-person point of view. The chorus is as follows:

Just a little prayer
When shadows are stealing
Just a little prayer,
A voice appealing;
To a baby shoe she's clinging
While the Angelus is ringing,
Come the words that start
From an aching heart:
"May angels guard him tenderly
Tonight and send my baby back to me".
That's a mother's prayer
For her boy "out there".
