= Harry Tally =

American songwriter

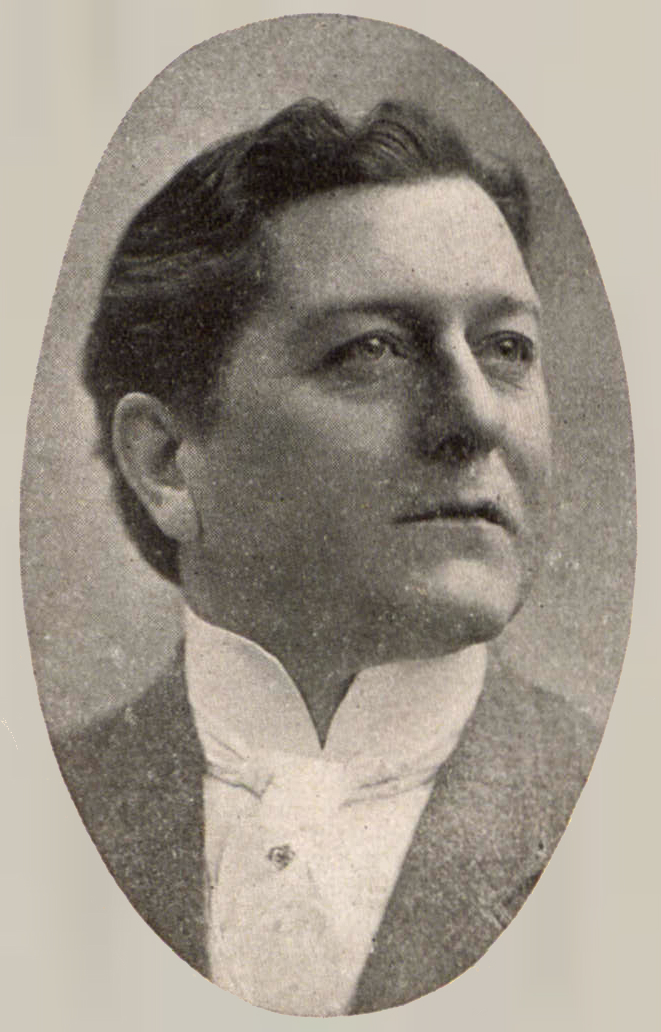
Singer and recording artist Harry Talley

Harry Lee Tally (June 30, 1866 – August 16, 1939) was an American tenor singer of popular songs, who recorded between 1902 and 1917.

== Biography ==
He was born in Memphis, Tennessee, and began performing in a popular vaudeville act, the Empire City Quartet. Described as "a sweet-voiced tenor", he first recorded as a solo singer in late 1902, and thereafter recorded prolifically for several labels, particularly Columbia, Victor, and Edison. He recorded a wide variety of material, from sentimental to comic.

Among his most commercially successful songs were "Seminole" (first recorded in 1903), "Wait 'Till the Sun Shines, Nellie" (1906) – which he may have been the first to record – and "Take Me Back To New York Town" (1907). Several of his songs were inspired by new technological innovations, including "On An Automobile Afternoon" (1906), "Let's Go Into A Picture Show" (1909) — one of the first songs to mention this new form of entertainment — and "Come, Josephine, In My Flying Machine" (1911). Tally also recorded duets, in the Edison Diamond Discs series, with another member of the Empire City Quartet, Harry Mayo, which have been described as "finely tuned performances combining expert harmonization with hilariously unrelated nonchalant banter." He also wrote songs with Harry Mayo, including "That's a Mother's Liberty Loan".

He continued to perform his songs in vaudeville, and made his last recordings in 1917. In 1918, he retired from the music business, and set up a cigar store in Ocean Park, California. He died in 1939 at the age of 73.
