= America, Here's My Boy =

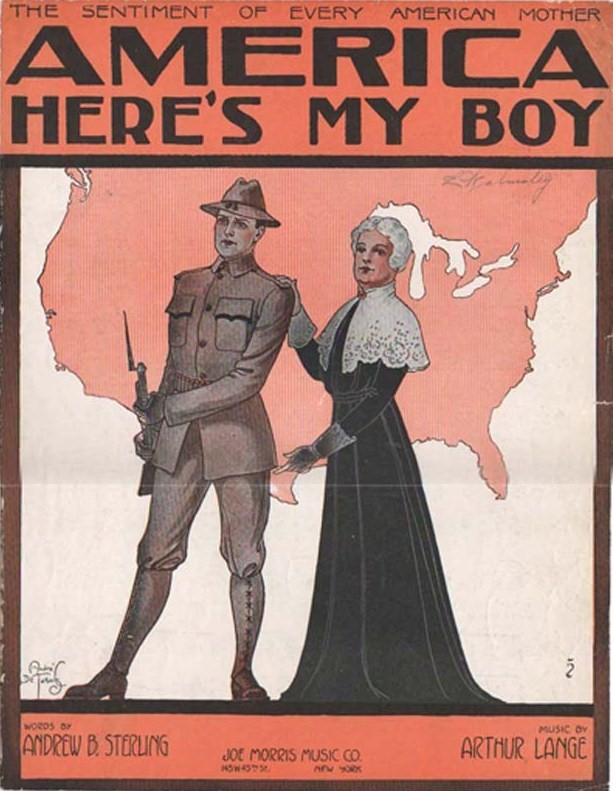

Song
- Published: February 16, 1917
- Composer: Arthur Lange
- Lyricist: Andrew B. Sterling

"America, Here's My Boy" was one of the most popular songs in the United States in 1917. The lyrics were by Andrew B. Sterling and the music by Arthur Lange; the publisher was the Joe Morris Music Co. of New York City. Written at the peak of the preparedness movement and copyrighted on February 16, 1917, it was widely regarded as a reply to "I Didn't Raise My Boy to Be a Soldier," the pro-neutrality hit published two years before. After the country entered the war it became a pervasive expression of commitment, with many performances by amateurs in venues from minstrel shows to benefit concerts. It was a favorite of the troops at training camps, and in October it was sung to Josephus Daniels, the Secretary of the Navy, by 12,000 sailors at the Great Lakes Naval Training Station.

Morris issued the first printing in February, with a cover designed by André De Takacs that billed the song as "The sentiment of every American mother." Over the next nine months eight more printings were issued; arrangements for band, orchestra, and even concertina appeared; and a version in translation was issued in Denmark. Aggressive advertising followed the song's introduction in vaudeville by Conroy and O'Donnell at the Prospect Theatre, Brooklyn, on March 5, 1917. It was quickly taken up by other entertainers, including headliners like Elsie Janis; in an arrangement for band it was widely played by John Philip Sousa. It appeared on at least nine piano rolls and over ten records, the first and most successful of which was by the Peerless Quartet, made on February 21, 1917, and released on Victor 18256. In the summer of 1917, records released by Victor, Edison, Pathé, and Emerson all appeared on the Chicago Tribune's lists of "Three Best Sellers".

Lange's music is a brisk march song, but with a verse in the parallel minor key that opens with a quotation of "Yankee Doodle." Sterling's lyrics adopt the structure of "I Didn't Raise My Boy to Be a Soldier," with a descriptive verse followed by a refrain in which the mother speaks with her own voice:

America, I raised a boy for you.
America, you'll find him staunch and true,
Place a gun up on his shoulder,
He is ready to die or do.
America, he is my only one;
My hope, my pride and joy,
But if I had another,
He would march beside his brother;
America, here's my boy.

Even though the song's popularity had diminished by the summer of 1918, the title, the music, and the lyrics were remembered in wartime plays like For Freedom and Mrs. Tubbs Does Her Bit and in postwar stories like Mary Raymond Shipman Andrews' Yellow Butterflies. More recently it has been performed by barbershop quartets and by singers like Tiny Tim. In 2012 American songwriter Beck used the song's title for a lament that is almost the opposite of the World War I title and is included in his Song Reader project.
