= Wait 'Till the Sun Shines, Nellie =

1905 song by Harry Von Tilzer and Andrew B. Sterling

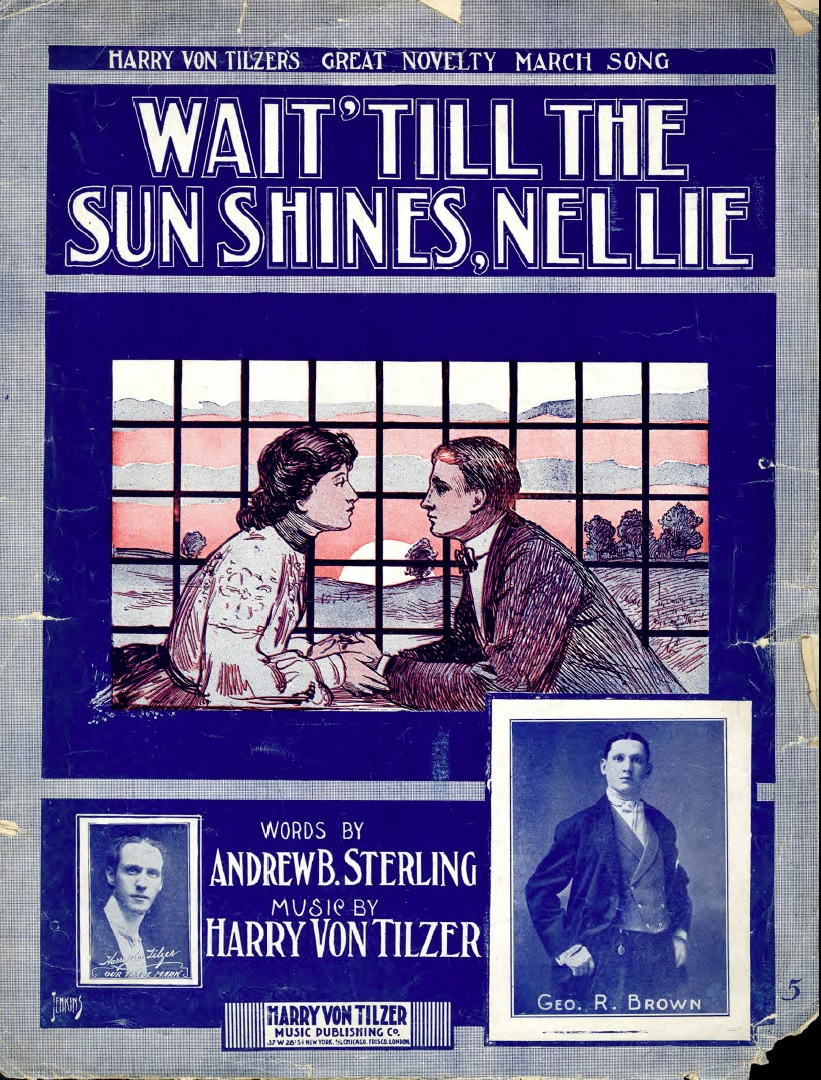
- 1905 sheet music cover with insert photos of songwriter Harry Von Tilzer and of singer Geo. R. Brown.

Song
- Released: 1905
- Genre: Pop standard
- Composer: Harry Von Tilzer
- Lyricist: Andrew B. Sterling

Audio sample
- Sung by Harry Tally in 1905. (Victor 4551): file; help

"Wait 'Till the Sun Shines, Nellie" is a 1905 popular song with music written by Harry Von Tilzer and lyrics by Andrew B. Sterling.

== History ==
"Wait 'Till the Sun Shines, Nellie" has been recorded many times and is now considered a pop standard. The first recorded versions were by Byron G. Harlan and Harry Tally.

In the August 15, 1929 Thimble Theatre comic strip, Castor Oyl sings the song after he loses $10 million.

Bing Crosby and Mary Martin sang it in the 1941 film Birth of the Blues, and also recorded it for Decca Records on March 13, 1942. Harry James recorded a version in 1941 on Columbia 36466.

In a long-standing tradition, floor traders at the New York Stock Exchange sing this song on the last trading day of every year and on Christmas Eve. The song has been the stock exchange anthem at least back as far as 1934.

It is also a popular song in barbershop music.

It appeared as a country music hit as performed by the Golden Memory Boys in the summer of 1940.

A sample of the song, sung a cappella by Tom Bromley, an elderly First World War veteran, appears on the Roger Waters 1992 album Amused to Death at the end of the track "What God Wants (Part III)". The clip is from BBC television's 1991 Everyman documentary, "A Game of Ghosts".

== Film appearances ==
The song has been featured in many films and found ideal for the purpose of evoking a period flavor.

- 1941 Birth of the Blues
- 1941 The Strawberry Blonde
- 1947 I Wonder Who's Kissing Her Now - sung on stage by a quartet
- 1949 In the Good Old Summertime - sung by George Boyce, Eddie Jackson, Joe Niemeyer, and Charles Smith
- 1950 Father Is a Bachelor
- 1952 Wait Till the Sun Shines, Nellie
- 2013 The Pink Marble Egg - sung by Jonathan King
