= If It Wasn't for the Irish and the Jews =

1912 song

"If It Wasn't for the Irish and the Jews" is a song written in 1912 by the Tin Pan Alley duo William Jerome and Jean Schwartz. The lyrics reflect a common theme in comic songs of the era: the pairing of disparate ethnic groups, especially Irish and Jews.
