= After the War Is Over Will There Be Any "Home Sweet Home"? =

1917 song by Pourmon, Woodruff, and Andrieu

"After the War Is Over Will There Be Any 'Home Sweet Home'?"
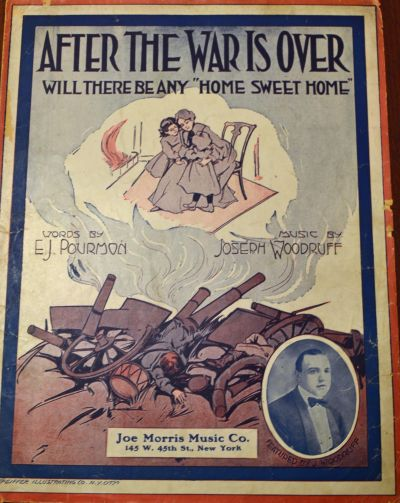
- Sheet music cover

Song by Joseph Woodruff
- Language: English
- Released: January 1, 1917
- Label: Joe Morris Music Co.
- Composer: Harry Andrieu
- Lyricists: Elmer J. Pourmon; Joseph Woodruff

"After the War Is Over Will There Be Any 'Home Sweet Home'?" is a World War I–era song released in 1917. Elmer J. Pourmon and Joseph Woodruff wrote the lyrics. Harry Andrieu composed the music. Contradictory information on the cover lists Woodruff as composer and Pourmon as lyricist.

There are four versions of the score published by the Joe Morris Music Co. of New York City and two known issues from Broad & Market Music Company. Pfeiffer Illustrating Co. designed the sheet music cover. It features a mother comforting her children. Below her are battle ruins with the body of a dead soldier in the center. To the right, is an inset photo of J. Woodruff. It was written for both voice and piano.

Lyricist Joseph Woodruff performed the song.

The sheet music can be found at the Pritzker Military Museum & Library.

The song is considered one of the bleaker assessments of life in postwar Europe. The lyrics emphasize the inevitable feeling of loss and change. The chorus is as follows:

After the war is over and the world's at peace,
Many a heart will be aching after the war has ceased
Many a child alone;
But I hope they'll all be happy
In a place called "Home Sweet Home".

The song references the 19th-century classic "Home! Sweet Home!"

== Bibliography ==
- Parker, Bernard S. (2007). World War I Sheet Music. Vol. 1. Jefferson: McFarland & Company, Inc. ISBN 978-0-7864-2798-7.
- Vogel, Frederick G. (1995). World War I Songs: A History and Dictionary of Popular American Patriotic Tunes, with Over 300 Complete Lyrics. Jefferson: McFarland & Company, Inc. ISBN 0-89950-952-5.
