= A Bird in a Gilded Cage =

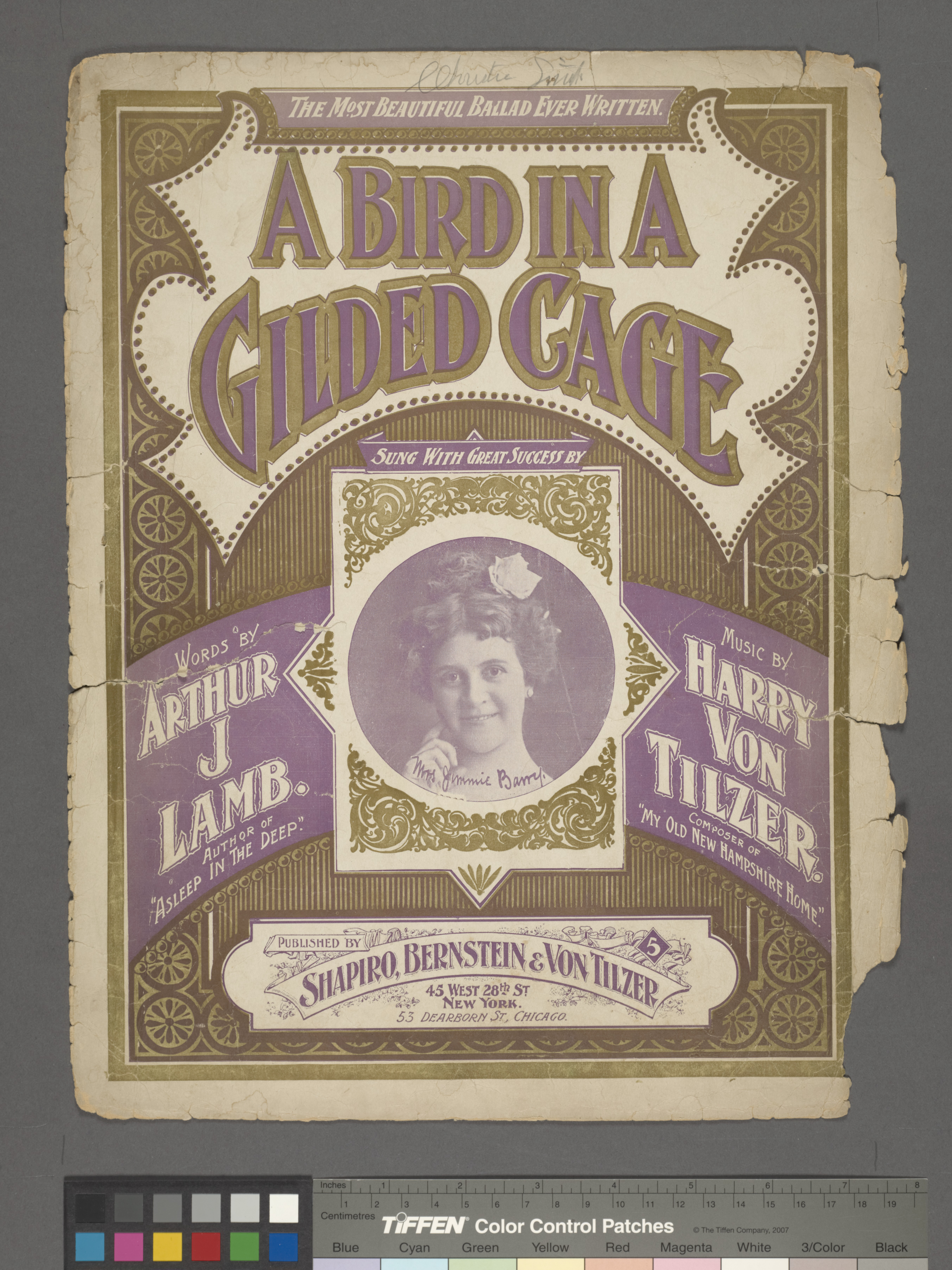

Song
- Published: 1900 by Shapiro, Bernstein & Von Tilzer
- Genre: Tin Pan Alley, pop standard
- Composer: Harry Von Tilzer
- Lyricist: Arthur J. Lamb

"A Bird in a Gilded Cage" is a song composed by Arthur J. Lamb and Harry Von Tilzer. It was a sentimental ballad (or tear-jerker) that became one of the most popular songs of 1900, reportedly selling more than two million copies in sheet music. Jere Mahoney (Edison) and Steve Porter (Columbia) recorded two early popular versions of this song.

== Background ==
According to Von Tilzer, he was approached in 1899 by Lamb with the lyrics for a song. Although Von Tilzer liked it, he asked Lamb to change some of the words to make it clear that the woman in the song was married and not a mistress. Later that evening, as he worked out a melody at a piano in a public house with some friends, he noticed that many of the girls nearby were crying, which convinced him the song could be a hit. Later, Von Tilzer would claim that this song was "the key that opened the door of wealth and fame" for him. Its success signalled the dominance of ballads in American popular music through 1914.

== Synopsis ==
The song describes the sad life of a beautiful woman who has married for money instead of love. Its lyrics are as follows:

Verse 1:

The ballroom was filled with fashion's throng,
It shone with a thousand lights,
And there was a woman who passed along,
The fairest of all the sights,
A girl to her lover then softly sighed,
There's riches at her command;
But she married for wealth, not for love, he cried,
Though she lives in a mansion grand.

Refrain:

She's only a bird in a gilded cage,
A beautiful sight to see,
You may think she's happy and free from care,
She's not, though she seems to be,
'Tis sad when you think of her wasted life,
For youth cannot mate with age,
And her beauty was sold,
For an old man's gold,
She's a bird in a gilded cage.

Verse 2:

I stood in a churchyard just at eve',
When sunset adorned the west,
And looked at the people who'd come to grieve,
For loved ones now laid at rest,
A tall marble monument marked the grave,
Of one who'd been fashion's queen,
And I thought she is happier here at rest,
Than to have people say when seen,

Refrain:

She’s only a bird in a gilded cage,
A beautiful sight to see,
You may think she’s happy and free from care,
She’s not but she seems to be,
It’s sad when you think of her wasted life,
For youth cannot mate with age,
And her beauty was sold,
For an old man’s gold,
She’s a bird in a gilded cage.

== See also ==
- List of best-selling sheet music
