= Arthur Lange =

Composer of popular music (1889–1956)

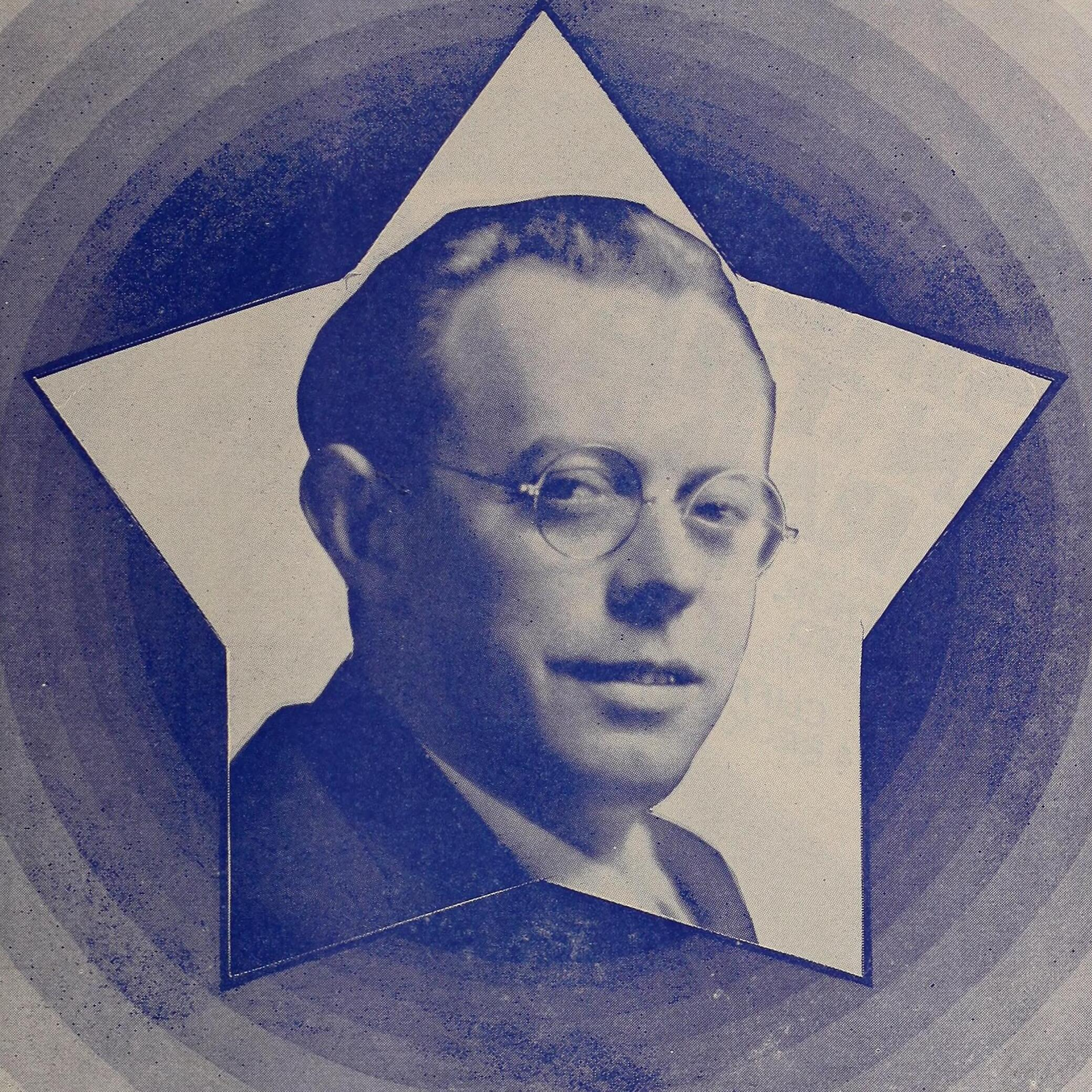
Lange c. 1929

Arthur Lange (né Arthur Paul Wilhelm Lange; 16 April 1889 Philadelphia – 7 December 1956 Washington, D.C.) was a United States bandleader and Tin Pan Alley composer of popular music. He composed music for over 120 films, including Grand Canary and Woman on the Run. Lange shared an Oscar nomination with Hugo Friedhofer for the film The Woman in the Window. He was nominated four times for Oscars, but did not win any.

== Life and career ==
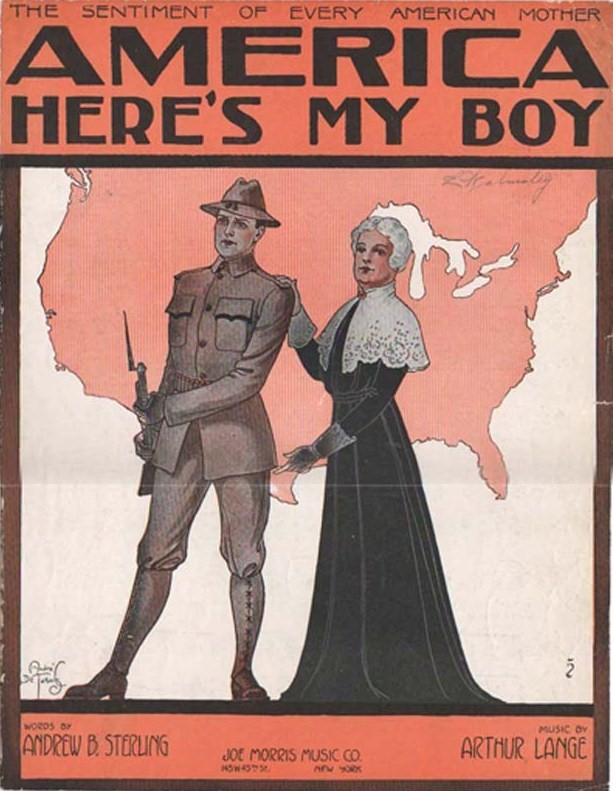
Sheet music cover for the song America, Here's My Boy (1917), with music by Arthur Lange

In the 1910s, Lange was active as a songwriter, collaborating frequently with lyricist Andrew B. Sterling and publishing with the Joe Morris Music Company. During the first half of the 1920s Lange recorded abundantly for Cameo Records. His 1923 orchestra, which also played the Cinderella Ballroom on Broadway and included trumpeters Earl Oliver and Tommy Gott, was at the end of that year bought by young well-to-do bandleader Roger Wolfe Kahn, and it is not known whether the recordings Lange made after this point and up to 1926 were still made by these musicians (Kahn himself did not start recording under his own name for Victor Records until March 1925) or by another group.

His 1928 recordings for Pathé Records were, however, almost certainly made by other unknown personnel. Though Lange himself played both piano and banjo he seems (with the exception of a recording by his "Lange trio" in 1922) to have acted only as conductor and arranger on his band recording dates.

Lange arranged the musical score for the segment featuring Buster Keaton in The Hollywood Revue.

Census records show that Lange shared a residence in the Hollywood Hills in 1930 with Ray Heindorf, who would go on to win three Academy Awards.

Limehouse Blues
Lange conducting his orchestra in 1924

Lange was a prolific arranger of dance band orchestrations during the 1920s. His "stock" orchestrations were in use by many bands of the day. Lange wrote "Arranging for the Modern Dance Orchestra" which was the definitive work of its day (published Robbins Music, 1926).

Lange also wrote the Spectrotone System of Orchestration - Book One (1943), with subtitle "A colorgraphic exposition of tone-color combinations and balanced as practiced in modern orchestration". That book was published by CO-ART. He published How to write double-stops for viola, violin and Cello, a supplement to Spectrotone, with the same publisher CO-ART. That work is available from Cambria Music. His work has recently been made more famous by Alexander Creative Media.

== Selected Songs ==
- with Andrew B. Sterling, A Mother's Prayer for Her Boy Out There, New York: Joe Morris Music Co, 1917. OCLC 892504792
- with Andrew B. Sterling, America, Here's My Boy, New York: Joe Morris Music Co, 1917. OCLC 9892806
- with Andrew B. Sterling, What'll We Do with Him Boys? (The Yanks Made a Monkey Out of You), New York: Joe Morris Music Co, 1918. OCLC 40913604

== Partial filmography ==
- A Woman of Experience (1931)
- The Common Law (1931)
- Devotion (1931)
- Freighters of Destiny (1931)
- My Weakness (1933)
- Orient Express (1934)
- In Old Kentucky (1935) (uncredited)
- The Magnificent Brute (1936)
- Lady of Burlesque (1943)
- The Woman in the Window (1944)
- Casanova Brown (1944)
- Along Came Jones (1945)
- The Fabulous Suzanne (1946)
- Woman on the Run (1950)
- War Paint (1953)
- The Mad Magician (1954)

== Awards ==
Lange was nominated five times for an Academy Award for Best Original Score.

- The Great Victor Herbert (1939)
- Lady of Burlesque (1943)
- Casanova Brown (1944)
- The Woman in the Window (1944)
- Belle of the Yukon (1945)
