= Winnisimmet Ferry =

Ferry between Chelsea and Boston's North End, founded in 1631

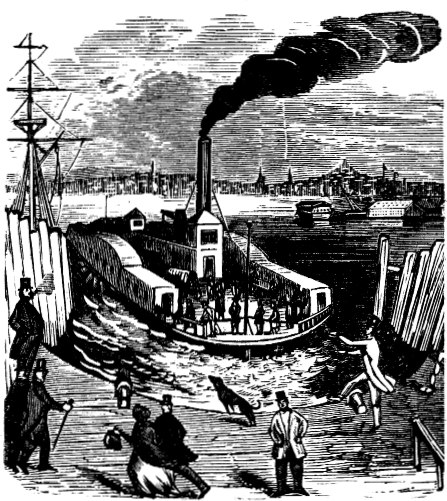
A woodcutting of the ferry

The Winnisimmet Ferry was a ferry between Chelsea, Massachusetts, United States, and Boston's North End. Founded in 1631, when Chelsea was called Winnisimmet, it was the oldest ferry in the country. It ceased operations in 1917. The original ferry was started by Thomas Williams (alias Harris) on 18 May 1631. After Harris' untimely death in 1634, William Stitson (who married Thomas' widow Elizabeth) took over the ferry.

The Montgomery & Howard shipyard in Chelsea, Massachusetts, built passenger steamboats, pilot boats, and ferryboats. They built for the Winnisimmet Ferry Company, Old Colony Steamship Company and the Fall River Line.

A temporary ferry service under the same name ran from May 15 to September 28, 1990, during early Big Dig construction. Privately funded and operated, it ran between Rowes Wharf in Boston and a pier in Chelsea Creek near Marginal Street.
