= Stranger Malone =

American musician (1909–2005)

- Born: Kasper Delmar Malone; October 25, 1909; Lovelaceville, Kentucky, US
- Died: May 30, 2005 (aged 95); Rome, Georgia, US
- Occupation: Musician
- Musical career
- Labels: Columbia

Kasper Delmar "Stranger" Malone (born October 25, 1909, near Lovelaceville, Kentucky – May 30, 2005, in Rome, Georgia) was an American musician. Malone's career as a recording artist spanned 77 years and, according to his biographer George King, is recognized as the longest by the Guinness World Records. His first recording, eight 78 rpm sides, was made by Columbia Records in 1926; his last one, with the Little Country Giants on their debut album Breaking Hearts and Living Free, in 2005. Malone was one of the first documented clarinet players in country music.

== Recording career ==
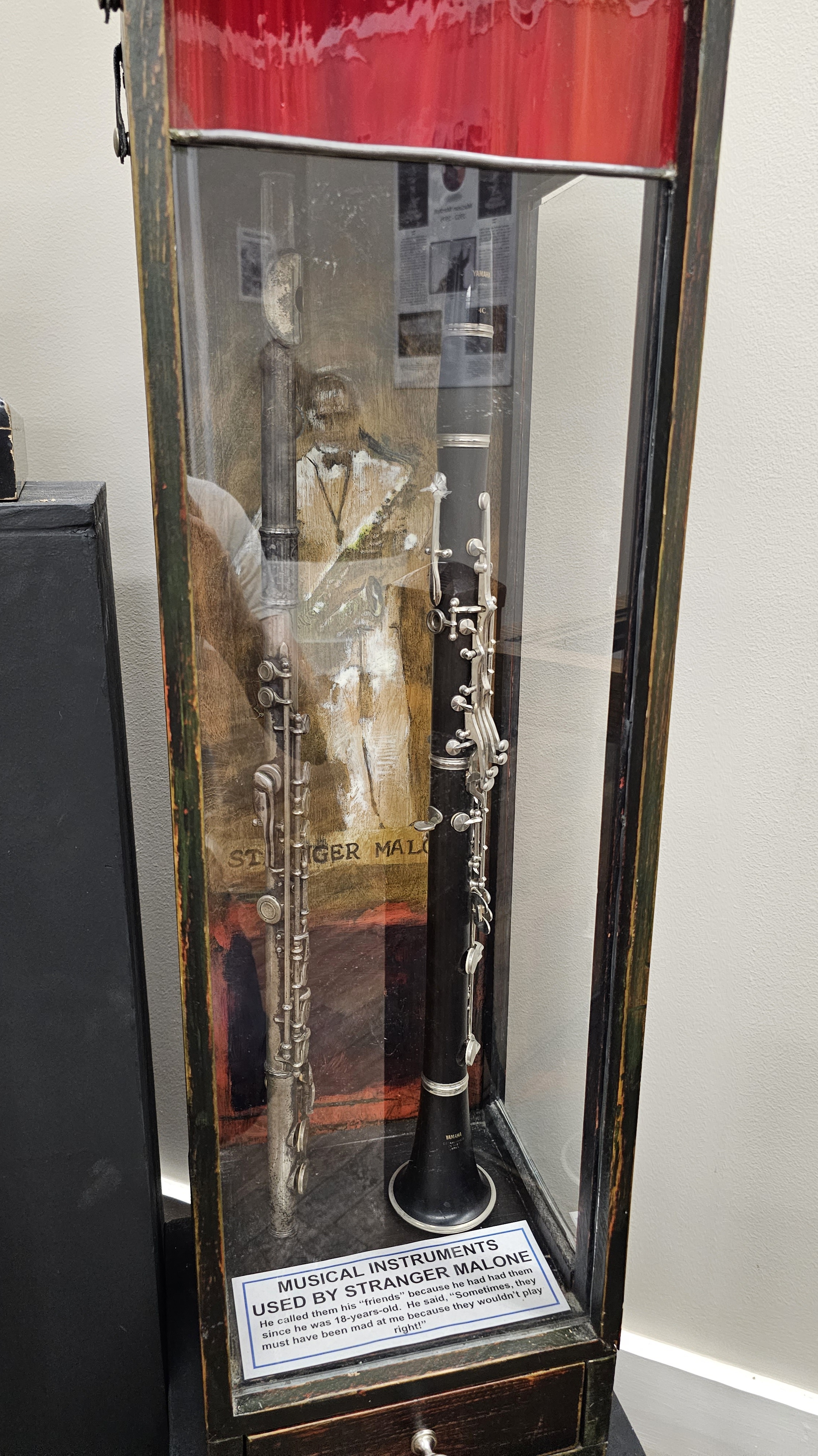
Musical instruments used by Malone, on display at the Rome Area History Museum in Rome, Georgia

Malone was born on a farm near Paducah, Kentucky and christened as Kanoy. Later, when he obtained a birth certificate, he preferred to change his first name to Kasper. He started playing the cornet the age of three. At the age of fifteen he left home, and joined a band of traveling musicians playing in silent movie theaters in Georgia. He learned the trade of playing clarinet and in 1926 joined Gid Tanner and His Skillet-Lickers. In the same year Clayton McMichen and Malone left Tanner and set up The Melody Men. On November 4, 1926, they made their recording debut, Let Me Call You Sweetheart. The band continued recording twice a year, first on a mobile rig sent from New York City, and since 1928 at Columbia's permanent studio in Atlanta, Georgia. According to Malone himself, the nickname Stranger was inspired by a yell from the crowd: "Who in the world is that little stranger playing the hell out of that saxophone?".

In 1929 Malone left Georgia for St. Louis, Missouri and joined Schnitz Seymour's Miniature Circus. The band was soon dissolved. Malone formed his own band in Kansas, then joined Jim Story Band in Nebraska. In 1931 he played clarinet, flute and double bass for the WNAX orchestra in Yankton, South Dakota and hosted his own radio show. For the next decade he continued travelling all over the country, including a tour with the SS Coolidge cruise liner in 1934. During World War II he performed with Phil Harris for the USS Maritime Service Band.

In 1953 Malone joined Jack Teagarden's All Stars and toured with this band for three years playing double bass and flute. After leaving Teagarden Malone briefly played in Las Vegas and then accepted an offer from the University of Arizona to join their staff and play principal bass at the Tucson Symphony Orchestra. He taught at the university for thirteen years and also played with the Denver Symphony and the San Francisco Symphony.

In 1973 he moved to Germany and settled there for twenty years, living by private music lessons. In 1993 he returned to the United States and, after a series of setbacks, found a job with the Rome Symphony Orchestra and moved to Rome, Georgia. He settled in the center of the town one block from the former movie theater where he had played in 1925. He continued playing, performing more than 100 times in 2004. Off stage, Malone was a book collector and a lifelong student of classic literature, history and philosophy.

In 2004 Malone received the Founder's Award of the Country Music Hall of Fame.
