= Harry Von Tilzer =

American songwriter (1872–1946)

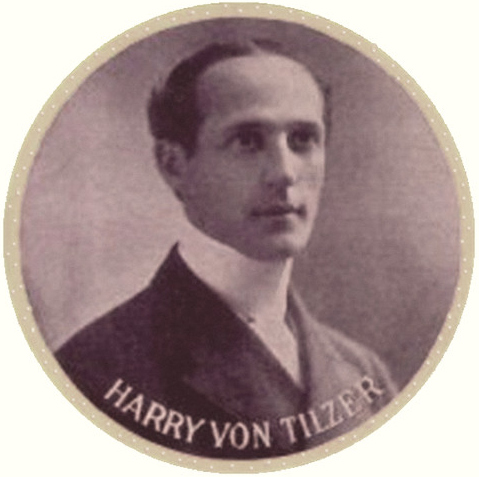
- Born: Aaron Gumbinsky; July 8, 1872; Detroit, Michigan
- Died: January 10, 1946 (aged 73); New York City
- Relatives: Albert Von Tilzer (brother)

Harry Von Tilzer (born Aaron Gumbinsky, also known as Harry Gumm; 8 July 1872 – 10 January 1946) was an American composer, songwriter, publisher and vaudeville performer.

== Early life ==
Von Tilzer was born in Detroit, Michigan. His parents, Sarah (Tilzer) and Jacob Gumbinsky, were Polish Jewish immigrants. Harry ran away and joined a traveling circus at age 14, where he adopted his mother's maiden name as his own, seeking to make it sound even classier by tacking on a "Von." So impressive seemed the transformation that eventually all his brothers changed their last name to match his.

== Career ==
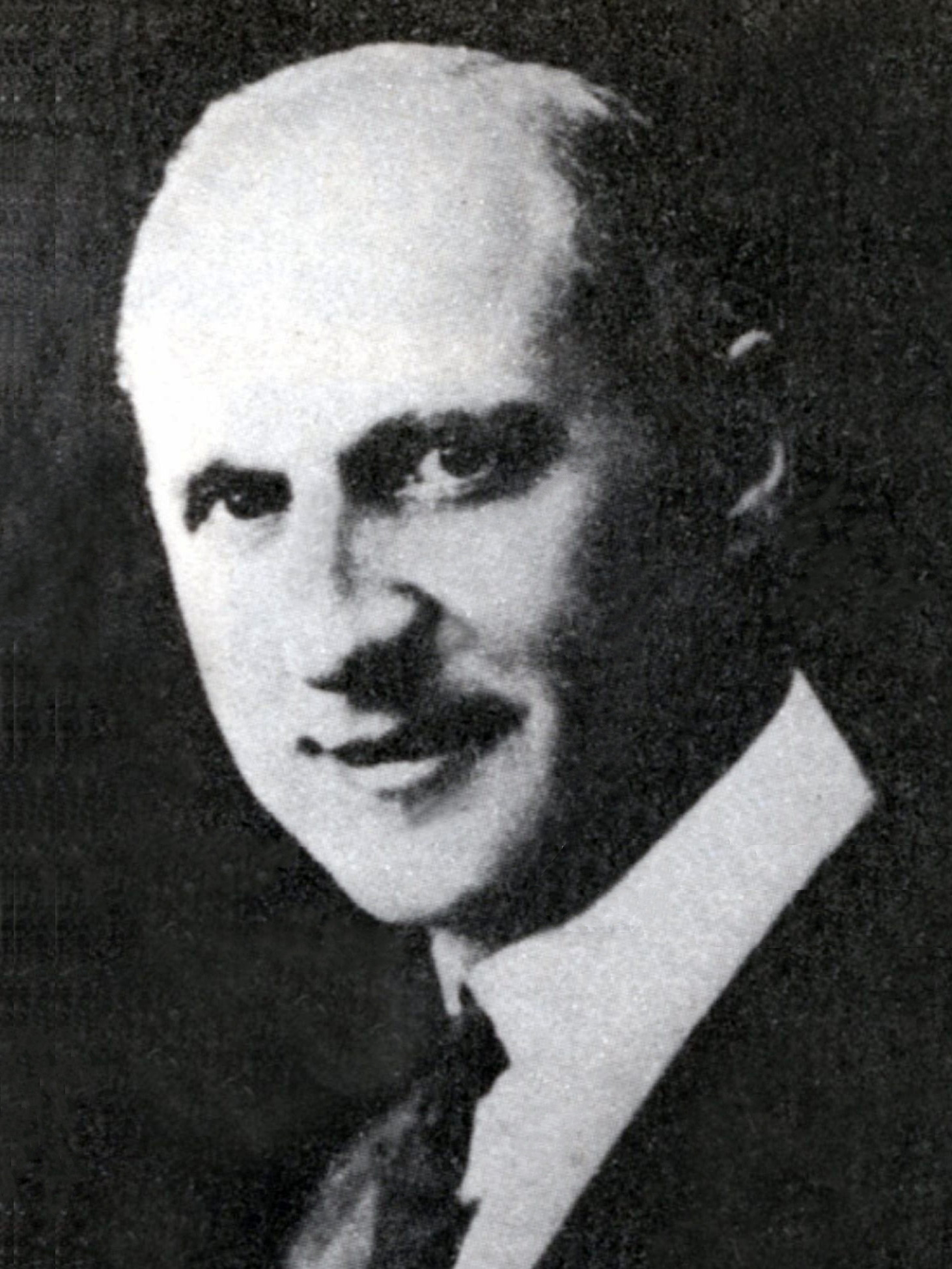
Von Tilzer, c. 1910

Harry proved successful playing piano and calliope and writing new tunes and incidental music for shows. He continued doing this for burlesque and vaudeville shows for some years, writing many tunes which were not published or which he sold to entertainers for one or two dollars. In 1898, he sold his song "My Old New Hampshire Home" to a publisher for $15 (equivalent to $567 in 2026), and watched it become a national hit, selling over two million copies of the sheet music. This prompted him to become a professional songwriter.

He was made a partner of the Shapiro Bernstein Publishing Company. His 1900 number "A Bird in a Gilded Cage" became one of the biggest hits of the time. Von Tilzer became one of the best-known Tin Pan Alley songwriters. In 1902, Von Tilzer formed his own publishing company, where he was soon joined by his younger brother Albert Von Tilzer. In 1914, Von Tilzer was a charter member of the performing rights society, American Society of Composers, Authors and Publishers (ASCAP).

Harry Von Tilzer's hits included "A Bird in a Gilded Cage," "The Cubanola Glide," "Wait 'Til The Sun Shines Nellie," "Old King Tut," "All Alone," "Mariutch," "The Ragtime Goblin Man," "I Love My Wife, But Oh You Kid!" "They Always Pick On Me," "I Want A Girl (Just Like The Girl That Married Dear Old Dad)" (with lyrics by William Dillon), "And The Green Grass Grew All Around," "On the Old Fall River Line," "Under the Anheuser Bush," and many others.

== Death ==
He died in New York City on January 10, 1946. Lawrence Welk's Teleklew Productions acquired Harry Von Tilzer Music in 1957.

== Work on Broadway ==
- The Fisher Maiden (1903) – opera – composer
- A Jolly Baron (1904) – musical – composer
- The Man From Now (1906) – musical – featured composer
- The Dairymaids (1907) – musical – featured songwriter
- Ziegfeld Follies of 1910 (1910) – revue – featured composer for "I'll Get You Yet"
- Doctor Jazz (1975) – musical – featured songwriter for "I Love It"
- Tintypes (1980) – revue – featured songwriter
