= 1895 in music =

Events in the year 1895 in music.

== Specific locations ==
- 1895 in Norwegian music

== Events ==
- March 4 – Gustav Mahler conducts the premiere of his Symphony No. 2, "Resurrection" in Berlin – the first three movements only.
- May 18 – Australian contralto Ada Crossley makes her London début at the Queen's Hall.
- August 10 – The first ever indoor promenade concert, origin of The Proms, is held at the Queen's Hall in London, opening a series promoted by impresario Robert Newman with 26-year-old Henry Wood as sole conductor. The first concert opens with the overture to Wagner's Rienzi. The orchestra tunes to the "French A" or diapason normal concert pitch.
- December 13 – The first complete performance of Gustav Mahler's Symphony No. 2, in Berlin with the composer conducting the Berlin Philharmonic orchestra (first three movements premièred on March 4).
- unknown dates
  - Composer Sidney Homer marries contralto Louise Dilworth Beatty.
  - Composer Zdeněk Fibich separates from his wife, the contralto Betty Fibichová, and goes to live with his former student and lover Anežka Schulzová.
  - Flautist Nicholas Laucella emigrates with his family to the United States from his home town of Nusco, Italy.
  - Venezuelan pianist, singer and composer Teresa Carreño divorces her husband, pianist Eugen d'Albert. It marks the end of her third marriage and his second.

== Published popular music ==
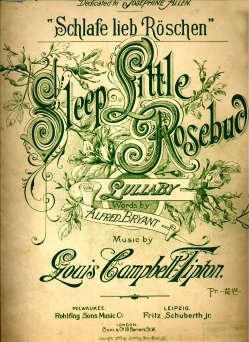

- "America the Beautiful" w. Katherine Lee Bates m. Samuel A. Ward
- "The Band Played On" w. John F. Palmer m. Charles B. Ward
- "The Belle of Avenoo A" w.m. Safford Waters
- "Down In Poverty Row" w. Gussie L. Davis m. Arthur Trevelyan
- "A Dream" w. Charles B. Cory m. J. C. Bartlett
- "The Hand That Rocks The Cradle" w. Charles W. Berkeley m. William H. Holmes
- "He's Not Dead Yet!" w. T. W. Connor
- "It's a Great Big Shame" w. Edgar Bateman m. George Le Brunn
- "Just Tell Them That You Saw Me" w.m. Paul Dresser
- "King Cotton (march)" m. John Philip Sousa
- "La Pas Ma La" w.m. Ernest Hogan
- "My Angeline" w. Harry B. Smith m. Victor Herbert
- "My Best Girl's a New Yorker" w.m. John Stromberg
- "Put Me Off at Buffalo" w. Harry Dillon m. John Dillon (Dillon Brothers)
- "Rastus on Parade" w. George Marion m. Kerry Mills
- "She Was One of the Early Birds" w.m. T. W. Connor
- "Sleep Little Rosebud" w. Alfred Bryant, m. Louis Campbell Tipton
- "The Soldiers of the Queen" w.m. Leslie Stuart
- "The Streets of Cairo" w.m. James Thornton
- "The Sunshine of Paradise Alley" w. Walter H. Ford m. John Walter Bratton

== Recorded popular music ==
- "Belles of Virginia"
  – Stephen B. Clements, Berliner Records
- "Bully Song"
  – May Irwin
- "Bye Bye Ma Honey"
  – Billy Golden, United States Phonograph Company
- "Carnival of Venice"
  – Charles P. Lowe
- "Cavalry"
  – J. W. Myers, Brown Wax Cylinder Home Recording
- "Dancing on the Housetops"
  – Issler's Orchestra, United States Phonograph Company
- "Dixie"
  – Issler's Orchestra, United States Phonograph Company
- "El Captain March"
  – Sousa's Band, Columbia Phonograph Company
- "Girl Wanted"
  – Dan W. Quinn, Berliner Records
- "Handicap March"
  – Sousa's Band
- "Henrietta Have You Met Her?"
  – Dan W. Quinn, Berliner Records
- "Her Eyes Don't Shine Like Diamonds"
  – George J. Gaskin, Berliner Records
- "Her Golden Hair Was Hanging Down"
  – Banta's Orchestra
- "I Don't Want To Play In Your Yard"
  – George J. Gaskin, Berliner Records
- "Just One Girl"
  – J. W. Myers, Berliner Records
- "Love Me Little Love Me Long"
  – Alice Raymond
- "Michael Casey as a Hotel Clerk"
  – Russell Hunting, Berliner Records
- "Michael Casey as Judge"
  – Russell Hunting, Berliner Records
- "Michael Casey's Plans For Freeing Ireland"
  – Russell Hunting, Berliner Records
- "My Blackbird"
  – Len Spencer
- "My Old Kentucky Home"
  – George J. Gaskin, Berliner Records
- "My Pearl Is A Bowery"
  – Issler's Orchestra, United States Phonograph Company
- "Nellie Bly"
  – W. Paris Chambers, Berliner Records
- "Nightingale Waltz"
  – Issler's Orchestra, United States Phonograph Company
- "The Band Played On"
  – Dan W. Quinn, Columbia Phonograph Company
- "The Sidewalks of New York"
  – Dan W. Quinn, Berliner Records
- "The Sidewalks of New York"
  – George J. Gaskin, Edison & Berliner Records
- "The Streets of Cairo"
  – Dan W. Quinn, Berliner Records
- "Washington Post March"
  – Sousa's Band, Columbia Phonograph Company
- "When You Know The Girl You Love Loves You"
  – George J. Gaskin, Berliner Records
- "Who Broke The Lock"
  – Unique Quartette, Edison Phonograph Co
- "Yazoo Dance"
  – Sousa's Band

== Classical music ==
- Béla Bartók
  - Capriccio in B minor, for piano, Op. 4
  - Fantasia in A minor, for piano, Op. 2
  - Fantasia, for violin, Op. 9
  - Pieces, for violin, Op. 7
  - Sonata No. 2 in F major, for piano, Op. 3
  - Sonata in C minor, for violin and piano, Op. 5
  - Sonata No. 3 in C major, for piano, Op. 6
- Léon Boëllmann – Suite Gothique for Organ
- Antonín Dvořák – Cello Concerto in B minor, thirteenth and fourteenth string quartets
- Edward Elgar – From the Bavarian Highlands, for chorus and orchestra, Op. 27
- George Enescu – "Study" Symphony No. 1 in D minor
- Gabriel Fauré
  - Allegro symphonique, for piano four-hands, Op. 68
  - Barcarolle No. 6 in E-flat major, for piano, Op. 70
  - Theme and Variations, for piano, Op. 73
- Anatoly Lyadov
  - Etude in F major, for piano, Op. 37
  - Mazurka in F major, for piano, Op. 38
  - Preludes (3), for piano, Op. 36
  - Preludes (4), for piano, Op. 39
- Henrique Oswald – Piano Quintet in C major, Op. 18
- Camille Saint-Saëns
  - Fantasy No. 2 in D♭ major, for organ, Op. 101
  - La Mort de Thaïs, Paraphrase de concert sur l'opéra de J. Massenet, for piano
  - Souvenir d'Ismaïlia, for piano, Op. 100
- Richard Strauss
  - Songs (3), for high voice and piano, Op. 29
  - Till Eulenspiegel's Merry Pranks, for orchestra, Op. 28
- Alexander von Zemlinsky – Serenade (Suite), for violin and piano

== Opera ==
- Isaac Albéniz – Henry Clifford
- Enrique Fernández Arbós – El Centro de la Tierra
- Nikolai Rimsky-Korsakov – Christmas Eve, 10 December, in St. Petersburg.

== Musical theater ==
- An Artist's Model London production opened at Daly's Theatre on February 2 and ran for 392 performances
- Dandy Dick Whittington London production
- The Shop Girl Broadway production opened at Palmer's Theatre on October 28 and ran for 72 performances
- The Tyrolean London production

== Births ==
- January 7 – Clara Haskil, pianist (died 1960)
- January 27 – Buddy De Sylva, songwriter (died 1950)
- February 7 – Irving Aaronson, jazz pianist and big band leader (died 1963)
- February 28 – Guiomar Novaes, Brazilian pianist (died 1979)
- March 4 – Bjarne Brustad, Norwegian composer and violinist (died 1978)
- March 23 – Dane Rudhyar, composer (died 1985)
- March 31 – Lizzie Miles, singer (died 1963)
- April 1 – Alberta Hunter, singer (died 1984)
- April 3
  - Mario Castelnuovo-Tedesco, composer (died 1968)
  - Zez Confrey, pianist and composer (died 1971)
- April 9 – Mance Lipscomb, popular singer (died 1976)
- April 23 – Jimmie Noone, jazz musician
- April 29 – Sir Malcolm Sargent, conductor (died 1967)
- May 1 – Leo Sowerby, composer (died 1968)
- May 2 – Lorenz Hart, US lyricist (died 1943)
- May 6 – Rudolph Valentino, dancer and actor (died 1926)
- May 11 – William Grant Still, composer (died 1978)
- June 16 – Lew Pollack, US composer (died 1946)
- June 21 – Mark Reizen, Soviet opera singer (died 1992)
- June 28 – Kazimierz Sikorski, Polish composer (died 1986)
- July 4 – Irving Caesar, US lyricist and librettist (died 1996)
- July 5 – Gordon Jacob, English composer (died 1984)
- July 10 – Carl Orff, German composer (died 1982)
- July 12
  - Kirsten Flagstad, Norwegian soprano (died 1982)
  - Oscar Hammerstein II, lyricist (died 1960)
- July 13 – Bradley Kincaid, folk singer (died 1989)
- July 25 – Yvonne Printemps, singer and actress (died 1977)
- August 6 – Ernesto Lecuona, Cuban composer (died 1963)
- August 10 – Harry Richman, US singer, actor and composer (died 1972)
- August 13 – Bert Lahr, vaudeville performer (died 1967)
- September 9 – Harry Tobias, US lyric writer (died 1994)
- September 16 – Karol Rathaus, Austrian (Ukrainian) composer (died 1954)
- September 22 – Herbert Janssen, German baritone (died 1965)
- October 11 – Jakov Gotovac, Croatian composer and conductor (died 1982)
- October 12 – Tubby Hall, jazz drummer (died 1945)
- October 17 – Doris Humphrey, dancer (died 1958)
- October 29 – Harry Ruby, songwriter (died 1974)
- November 5 – Walter Gieseking, German pianist and composer
- November 16 – Paul Hindemith, German composer (died 1963)
- November 28
  - José Iturbi, pianist (died 1980)
  - Jacobo Rubalcaba, Cuban musician and bandleader (died 1960)
- November 29 – Busby Berkeley, film director, choreographer (died 1976)
- November 30 – Johann Nepomuk David, composer (died 1977)
- December 2 – Harriet Cohen, pianist (died 1967)
- December 16 – Andy Razaf, composer, poet and lyricist (died 1973)

== Deaths ==
- January 10 – Benjamin Godard, composer (born 1849)
- January 22 – Edward Solomon, pianist, conductor and composer (born 1855) (typhoid)
- February 6 – Otto Mahler, composer (born 1873) (suicide)
- February 16 – Fredrik August Dahlgren, songwriter (born 1816)
- February 24 – Ignaz Lachner, conductor and composer (born 1807)
- March 16 – Richard Corney Grain, entertainer and songwriter (born 1844) (influenza)
- March 18 – Priscilla Horton, singer and actress (born 1818)
- April 28 – Jean Joseph Bott, violinist and composer (born 1826)
- May 21 – Franz von Suppé, composer (born 1819)
- June 15 – Richard Genée, librettist and composer (born 1823)
- June 28 – Ján Koehler, operatic baritone
- July 13 – John Tiplady Carrodus, violinist (born 1836)
- August 2 – Ernest Appy, US cellist and composer (born 1834)
- August 6 – George Frederick Root, US composer (born 1820)
- August 13 – Ludwig Abel, violinist, composer and conductor (born 1834)
- October 12 – Cecil Frances Alexander, hymn-writer (born 1818)
- October 25 – Charles Hallé, pianist and conductor (born 1819)
- November – Raffaele Mirate, operatic tenor (born 1815)
- November 1 – Aleksander Zarzycki, pianist, conductor and composer (born 1834)
- date unknown
  - Charles Albrecht, composer of the national anthem of Monaco (born 1817)
  - Basilio Basili, operatic tenor and composer (born 1804)
  - Angelique Magito, opera and concert singer (born 1809)
  - Nipper, the dog on the HMV record label (born 1884)
