= 1889 in music =

The following events occurred in the field of music in the year 1889.

== Specific locations ==
- 1889 in Norwegian music

== Events ==
- January 4 – Anton Seidl conducts Das Rheingold at the Metropolitan Opera, commencing the first performance of the Ring Cycle in the United States.
- February 17 – César Franck's Symphony in D minor is premièred at the Paris Conservatory under the direction of Jules Garcin.
- May 6–October 31 – Exposition Universelle in Paris includes several large theatres for concerts, including the music and dance of French Indochina. Operas and concerts are also given in the grand hall of the Trocadéro Palace. Other musical events of the Exposition include:
  - May 14 – The Opéra Comique premieres with a work specially composed for the event, Jules Massenet's Esclarmonde (debuting American soprano Sybil Sanderson).
  - Nikolai Rimsky-Korsakov conducts concerts of Russian music by The Five, introducing them to Paris.
  - At the exposition, French composer Claude Debussy first hears gamelan music, performed by an ensemble from Java, which influences some of his later compositions.
- May 28 – The first ever pre-recorded wax cylinders of songs, instrumental music and humorous monologues are introduced by Edison Records. Among them are Johannes Brahms speaking and playing his Hungarian Dance No. 1 and an extract from Josef Strauss's Polka-Mazurka 'Die Libelle' ('The Dragonfly') Op. 204 on the piano.
- October 17 – The Manuscript Society of New York holds its first meeting.
- November 20 – Gustav Mahler premieres his Symphony No. 1 in Budapest at the Vigadó Concert Hall, at this time described as a "Symphonic-Poem in 2 Parts"; it is not favourably received in this form.
- December 20 - Lincoln Music Hall in Washington, D.C. opens with a performances by the Boston Symphony Orchestra under conductor Arthur Nikisch.
- Emile Berliner markets the first commercial gramophone records.
- Joseph Kekuku is credited with inventing the Hawaiian steel guitar.

== Published popular music ==
- "Ask A Policeman" w. E. W. Rogers m. A. E. Duran Deau
- "Down Went McGinty" w.m. Joseph Flynn
- "Little Annie Rooney (Is My Sweetheart)" w.m. Michael Nolan
- "Oh, Promise Me" w. Clement Scott m. Reginald de Koven
- "Playmates" w.m. Harry Dacre
- "Slide Kelly Slide" w.m. John W. Kelly
- "Take a Pair of Sparkling Eyes" w. W. S. Gilbert m. Arthur Sullivan
- "The Thunderer" m. John Philip Sousa
- "The Washington Post (march)" m. John Philip Sousa

== Recorded popular music ==
- "22nd Regiment March" – Frank Goede
- "Ain't Going to Rain No More" – Will Lyle (banjo)
- "Amusement Polka" – John Mitthauer
- "And the Phonograph is Listening" – Will Lyle (banjo)
- "Anniversary March" – Max Franlin
- "Arbucklenian Polka" – David B. Dana (cornet) & Edward Issler (piano)
- "The Beggar Student" – Duffy & Imgrund's Fifth Regiment Band
- "Colonel Wellington's March" – Voss' First Regiment Band
- "Comin' Thro' the Rye" – George Schweinfest (flute) & Edward Issler (piano)
- "Dream After the Ball" – George Schweinfest (flute) & Edward Issler (piano)
- "Dream of Love" – William Tuson (clarinet) & Edward Issler (piano)
- "Down Went McGinty" – Issler's Orchestra
- "Fifth Regiment March" – Issler's Orchestra
- "For Right & Liberty" – Issler's Orchestra
- "Hoboken Pioneers" – Issler's Orchestra
- "Honeymoon Waltz" – Frank Goede
- "Kentucky Jubilee" – Issler's Orchestra
- "Jingle Bells" – Will Lyle (banjo)
- "Jubilee March" – Duffy & Imgrund's Fifth Regiment Band
- "The Men of Wall Street" – George Schweinfest (flute)
- "The Minstrel Boy" – Theodore Hoch
- "The Night Alarm" – Duffy & Imgrund's Fifth Regiment Band
- "The Pattison Waltz" – Effie Stewart (1863 - 1904) (vocal) & Theo Wangemann (piano)
- "Pearl of Pekin" – Henry Giese
- "The Phonograph Serenade" – Duffy & Imgrund's Fifth Regiment Band
- "Rattle on a Banjo" – Will Lyle (banjo)
- "Right & Liberty March" – George Schweinfest (flute)
- "Section from 'The Mikado'" – Issler's Orchestra
- "Song of the Roses" – Duffy & Imgrund's Fifth Regiment Band
- "Semper Fidelis" – Issler's Orchestra
- "The Warbler" – Frank Goede
- "Washington Centennial Parade" – Duffy & Imgrund's Fifth Regiment Band
- "The Wren Polka" – George Schweinfest (flute) & Edward Issler (piano)

== Classical music ==
- Antonín Dvořák
  - Piano Quartet No. 2, Op. 87 (B. 162)
  - Symphony No. 8, Op. 88 (B. 163)
- Edward Elgar – "Queen Mary's Song"
- César Franck – "Symphony in D minor" premiers on 2.17.1889 in Paris
- Enrique Granados – Danzas españolas
- Augusta Holmès – Ode triomphale
- Hubert Parry
  - Ode on Saint Cecilia's Day
  - Symphony No. 3, in C major, "The English" (first performance)
  - Symphony No. 4, in E minor (first performance, original version)
- Guy Ropartz
  - Cinq pièces brèves, for orchestra
  - Carnaval, for orchestra
- Johan Wagenaar – De Schipbreuk (cantata)
- Valentin Zubiaurre – Ecos de Oiz

== Opera ==
- Francesco Cilea – Gina
- Antonín Dvořák – Jakobín (premieres February 12,1889 at National Theatre in Prague)
- Robert Fuchs – Die Königsbraut
- Miguel Marqués – El plato del día (libretto by Andrés Ruesga, Manuel Lastra and Enrique Prieto, premiered in Madrid)
- Louisa Melvin Delos Mars – Leoni, the Gypsy Queen (premiered in Providence, Rhode Island)
- Giacomo Puccini – Edgar

== Musical theater ==
- The Gondoliers (Music: Sir Arthur Sullivan Book & Lyrics: W. S. Gilbert) London production opened at the Savoy Theatre on December 7 and ran for 554 performances
- Love's Trickery London production

== Published Writings ==
- Upton, George P. (1889). The Standard Symphonies, Their History, Their Music, and Their Composers: A Handbook. Chicago: A. C. McClurg and Company.

== Births ==
- January 31 – Michael Coleman, fiddler (d. 1945)
- February 7 – Claudia Muzio, operatic soprano (d. 1936)
- March 8 – Ina Boyle, Irish composer (d. 1967)
- March 15 – Billy Jones, singer (d. 1940)
- March 16 – Elsie Janis, musical comedy star and songwriter (d. 1956)
- April 3 – Grigoraș Dinicu, Romanian composer and violinist (d. 1948)
- April 8 – Adrian Boult, conductor (d. 1983)
- April 11 – Nick LaRocca – jazz-band leader (d. 1961)
- April 30 – Rudolph Simonsen – composer (d. 1947)
- May 15 – Graziella Pareto, operatic soprano (d. 1973)
- May 16 – Alfred Kalmus, music publisher (d. 1972)
- May 20 – Felix Arndt, pianist & composer (d. 1918)
- May 25 – Gilardo Gilardi, pianist, conductor and composer (d. 1962)
- May 29 – Aksel Agerby, Danish composer, organist, and music administrator (d. 1942)
- July 4 – Joe Young, US lyricist and singer (d. 1939)
- July 10 – Noble Sissle, bandleader and singer (d. 1975)
- August 10 – Cecil Armstrong Gibbs, composer (d. 1960)
- September 10 – Vilém Petrželka, conductor and composer (d. 1967)
- September 26 – Frank Crumit, singer (d. 1943)
- October 3 – Manuel Manetta, jazz musician & teacher (d. 1969)
- October 28 – Juliette Béliveau, actress and singer (d. 1975)
- November 30 – Norman Cocker, organist and composer (d. 1953)
- December 11 – Ben Black, composer and impresario (d. 1950)
- December 25 – Nathaniel Shilkret, composer and musician (d. 1982)
- December 28 – Vaslav Nijinsky, Ballet dancer (d. 1950)
- date unknown – Nellie Briercliffe, singer and actress (d. 1966)

== Deaths ==
- January 23 – Selina Dolaro, actress and singer (b. 1849) (stroke)
- January 31 – Joseph Gungl, composer and conductor (b. 1810)
- March 3 – Sydney Smith, English composer and pianist (b. 1839)
- March 13 – Felice Varesi, operatic baritone (b. 1813)
- April 6 – Frederick Ouseley, organist, composer and musicologist (b. 1825)
- April 9 – Jean-Baptiste Arban, cornet virtuoso (b. 1825)
- April 30 – Carl Rosa, opera impresario (b. 1842)
- May 30 – Silverio Franconetti, flamenco singer (b. 1831)
- July 7 – Giovanni Bottesini, double bass player and composer (b. 1821)
- July 14 – Elma Ström, Swedish opera singer (b. 1822)
- July 20 – Gustav Lange, German composer (b. 1830)
- October 5 – Karel Miry, Belgian composer (b. 1823)
- October 10 – Adolf von Henselt, pianist and composer (b. 1814)
- November 24 – Frederic Clay, composer (b. 1838) (stroke)
- November 25 – Alojzy Gonzaga Jazon Żółkowski, actor and singer (b. 1814)
- December 13 – Catherine Chislova, ballerina (b. 1846)
- December 31 – Giuseppe Apolloni, composer (b. 1822)
- date unknown
  - Jovo Ivanišević, composer (b. 1861)
  - Gustaw Lewita, pianist (b. 1855)
  - Jeanne-Catherine Pauwels, Belgian pianist (b. 1795)
  - Kurmangazy Sagyrbaev, Kazakh folk musician and composer (b. 1818)
