= Ben Harney =

American songwriter, entertainer and father of ragtime music

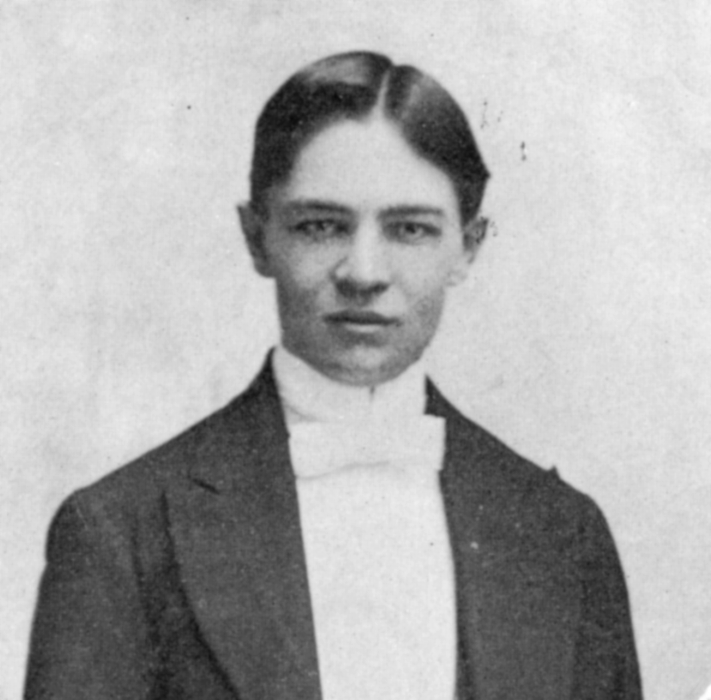
Ben Harney, from cover of the 1896 sheet music release of Mister Johnson Turn Me Loose, published by M. Witmark & Sons

Benjamin Robertson Harney (March 6, 1871 – March 2, 1938) was an American songwriter, entertainer, and father of ragtime music. His 1895 composition "You've Been a Good Old Wagon but You Done Broke Down" is known as the very first ragtime composition to be published and the first ragtime hit to reach the mainstream. For a while, it was thought the first Ragtime composition published was La Pas Ma La written by Ernest Hogan in 1895. But, the copyright for "You've Been a Good Old Wagon but You Done Broke Down" was registered in January 1895 (Greenup Music Co.)source, a few months prior to La Pas Ma La (September 1895, J. R. Bell)source, proving (contrary to popular belief), it was in fact the first of the two. During the early years of Harney's career, he promoted himself as being the inventor of ragtime. Although ragtime is now primarily more associated with figures such as Joseph Lamb (composer) and Scott Joplin, in 1924 The New York Times wrote that Ben Harney "Probably did more to popularize ragtime than any other person." Time magazine called him "Ragtime's Father" in 1938.

== Life and career ==
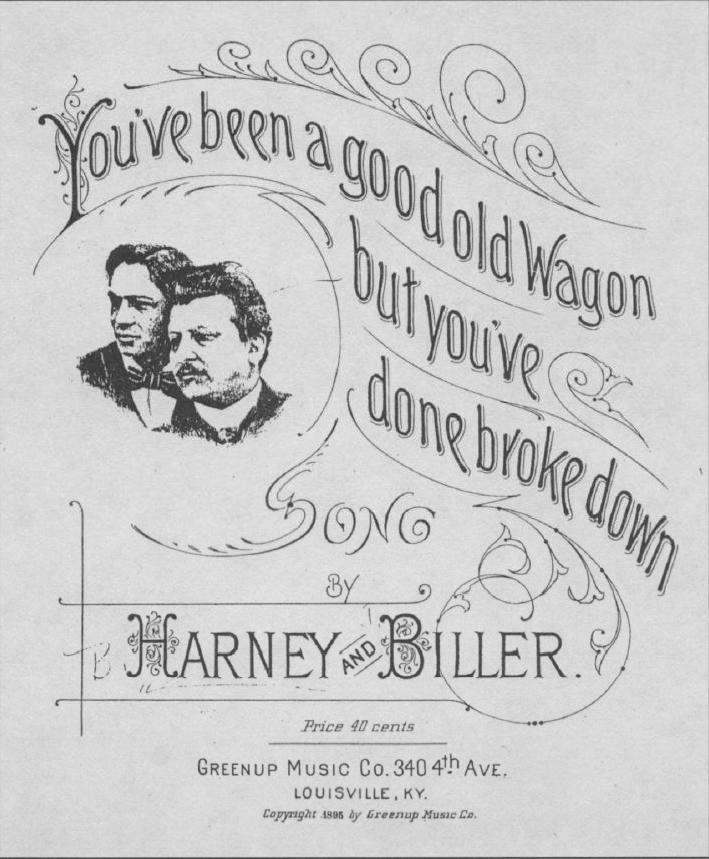
The cover of the 1895 sheet music, published by Greenup Music Co. in Louisville, Kentucky

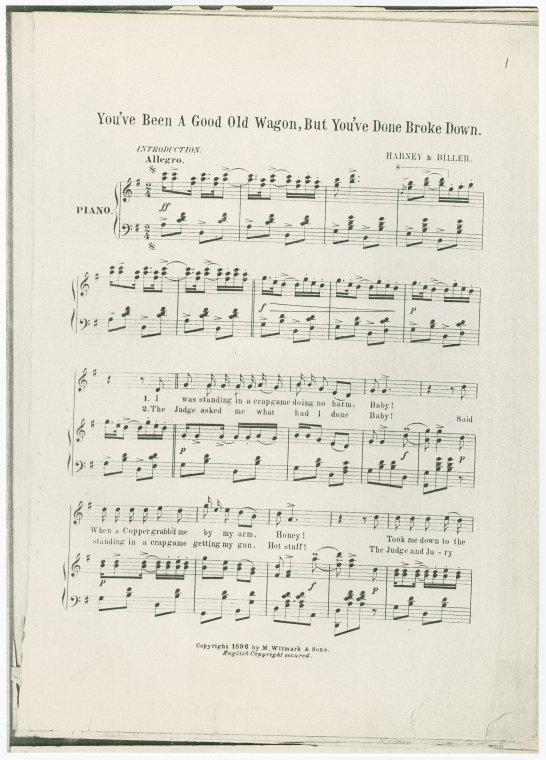
A page from the 1896 sheet music, published by M. Witmark & Sons in New York City, New York

Two different editions of "You've Been a Good Old Wagon but You Done Broke Down"

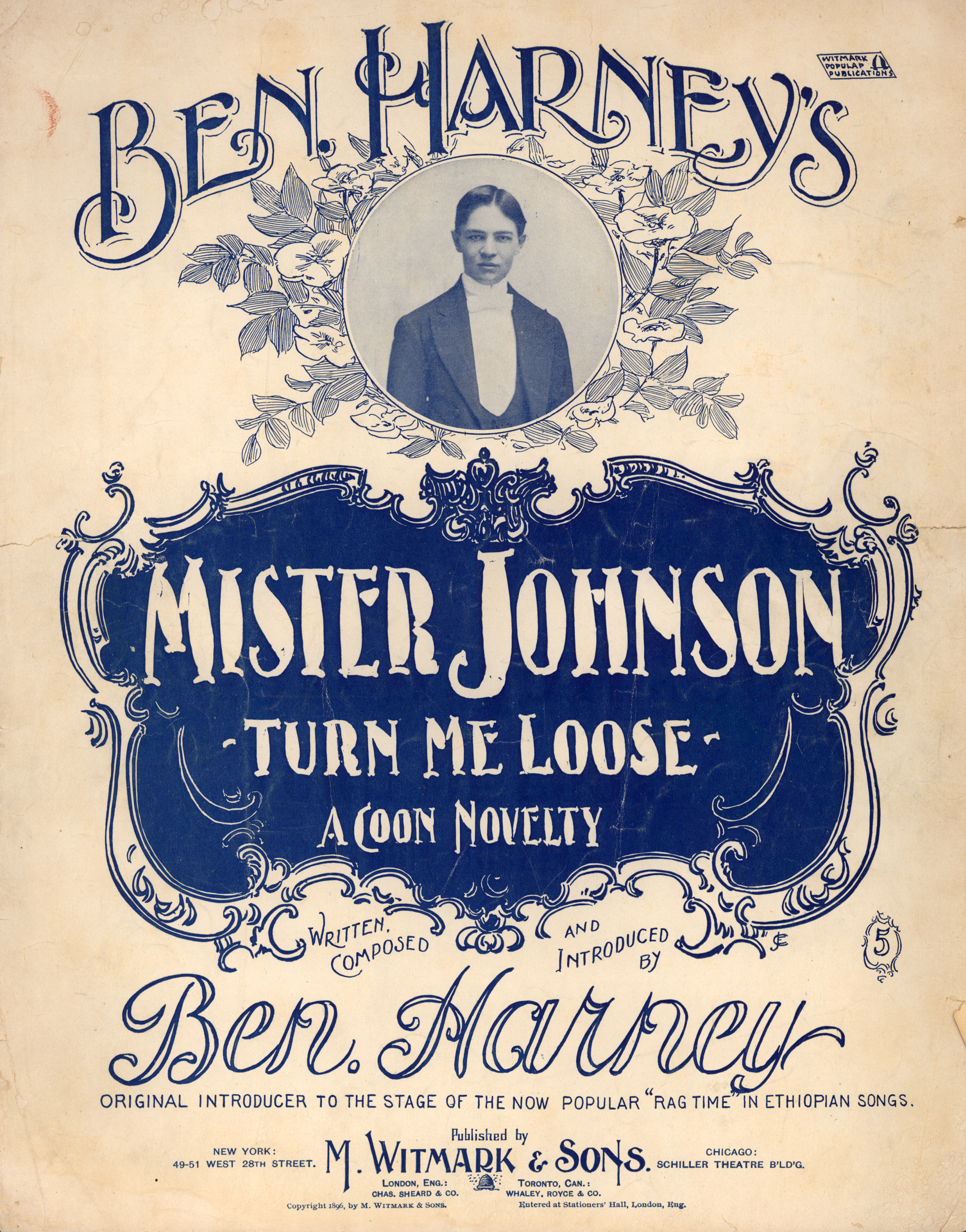
The cover of the sheet music for Mister Johnson Turn Me Loose (1896)

Harney is generally said to have been born in Louisville, Kentucky. Although some sources put his birthplace as Nashville, Tennessee, according to his father's military records he was born in Memphis, Tennessee. In the past some have falsely claimed that Harney was African-American, and early in his career, he was rumored to have played with African-American theater troupes. But, W.C. Handy correctly referred to him as White. All photographic and contemporary accounts show that Harney was of European descent. He married and lived in White society and always represented himself as White. Furthermore, his well-documented family background conclusively proves his ethnicity. Harney was the son of Benjamin Mills Harney, a veteran of both the Mexican–American War and the Civil War, and his second wife Margaret Wellington Draffin, daughter of a prominent Kentucky lawyer. His grandfather was John Hopkins Harney, the first mathematics professor at Indiana University and author of the first algebra textbook ever published in the United States. His uncle William Wallace Harney was a renowned journalist and author. He counted two prominent U.S. generals as distant cousins: Lew Wallace and William Selby Harney.

Harney's tunes "You've Been a Good Old Wagon but You Done Broke Down", "Mister Johnson, Turn Me Loose", and "Cake Walk In The Sky" were big hits in the late 1890s. In 1896, the cover of Ben Harney's song "You've Been a Good Old Wagon but You Done Broke Down", stated that Harney was the "Original Introducer to the Stage of the Now Popular 'Rag Time' in Ethiopian Song." This was the earliest known references to ragtime on sheet music and some sources have regarded the composition as being the first published rag. The sheet music version of "Cake Walk in the Sky" provided the first written out example of vocal ragging (early scat). A recording of Harney singing "The Wagon" (see below), although recorded many years later, in 1925, fits early accounts of Harney's, then, very remarkable vocal style and suggests that Harney was singing very authentic sounding blues back in the 1890s. "Cake Walk in the Sky" was published by M. Witmark & Sons in New York in 1899. On the cover to the sheet music, "Cake Walk in the Sky" is described as a "March A La Ragtime" and as "A Rag-Time Nightmare".

In January 1896 Harney moved to New York City, where he appeared regularly at Tony Pastor's Music Hall. That same year Harney was referred to in print as "the rag time pianist". Harney's appearances in New York, such as at the Weber and Fields' Broadway Music Hall, the Metropolitan Opera House, and Tony Pastor's Music Hall, promoting ragtime music, did much to create widespread popular and commercial enthusiasm for ragtime as a new genre of American music. He also organized and directed a variety show called Ragtime Reception.

In 1897 Harney published his book Ben Harney's Rag Time Instructor, the first description of how to rag: how to improvise rag time music by syncopating unsyncopated popular tunes. His Rag Time Instructor was arranged by ragtime composer Theodore H. Northrup and included written-out examples of "ragged" popular tunes including light classics and opera songs.

Also in 1897, Harney married Edyth Murray of Streator, Illinois. They later divorced, and he married an actress, Jessie Boyce, whose stage name was Jessie Haynes.

Harney toured widely on the vaudeville circuits in the United States, as well as tours of theaters in Europe and Asia, Australasia and the South Pacific. Once ragtime became popular he started promoting himself as The Originator of Ragtime or The Father of Ragtime. Harney's act included him ragging tunes at the piano, scat singing, and dancing. Theatrical photographs from his Australasia tour (1911) show him dancing in blackface.

Harney quit touring after suffering from a heart attack in 1928. He would later die of a heart attack at the age of 66 in Philadelphia, Pennsylvania on March 2, 1938. In an appreciation that appeared in Time magazine on March 14, 1938, a week after his death, he was described as "Ragtime's Father". Time wrote that "the first man to write ragtime down on paper was a slick-haired Kentuckian, Ben Harney."

== Compositions ==
Ben Harney's compositions included:

- 1890s
  - "Tomahau"
  - "Wissahickon"
- 1895
  - "You've Been a Good Old Wagon but You Done Broke Down", arranged by Johnny Biller
- 1896
  - "Mister Johnson, Turn Me Loose"
  - "I Love My Honey"
- 1897
  - "There's A Knocker Layin' Around"
  - "Ben Harney's Ragtime Instructor", arranged by Theodore H. Northrup
  - "I Love My Little Honey", arranged by W.H. Mackie
- 1898
  - "Draw That Color Line: A Decision of Color"
  - "If You Got Any Sense You'll Go"
  - "You May Go, But This Will Bring You Back"
- 1899
  - "The Hat He Never Ate", with Howard S. Taylor
  - "This Sporting Life Is Certainly Killing Me"
  - "The Cake Walk in the Sky: Ethiopian Two Step", arranged by F.W. Meacham
  - "The Cake Walk in the Sky: Song"
  - "Tell it to Me: A Coontown Expression"
  - "The Black Man's Kissing Bug: An Interrupted Osculation in Darktown"
  - "I Love One Sweet Black Man"
- 1901
  - "The Only Way to Keep A Gal is to Keep Her in a Cage"
  - "I'd Give a Hundred if the Gal Was Mine"
- 1902
  - "T.T.T." ("Treat, Trade or Travel")
- 1913
  - "There's Only One Way to Keep a Gal", arranged by W. R. Dorsey
- 1914
  - "Cannon Ball Catcher"
- 1925
  - "The Wagon", recorded by Harney on a phonograph cylinder, U.S. Library of Congress

== Listen ==
The Wagon
Ragtime from the Library of Congress' Gordon Collection; performed by Ben Harney in Philadelphia, Pennsylvania, on about September 9, 1925

While Harney was neglected by commercial recording studios during his lifetime, in 1925 a folklorist, Robert Winslow Gordon, recorded Harney singing an example of an early ragtime or rag-blues song, "The Wagon", on a dictaphone phonograph cylinder, and this recording has survived. Harney stated on the recording: "This is absolutely the first song published in ragtime; the first song ever written in ragtime. The idea was conceived by Ben Harney, in Louisville, Kentucky."
