= Dillon Brothers =

American comedy duo

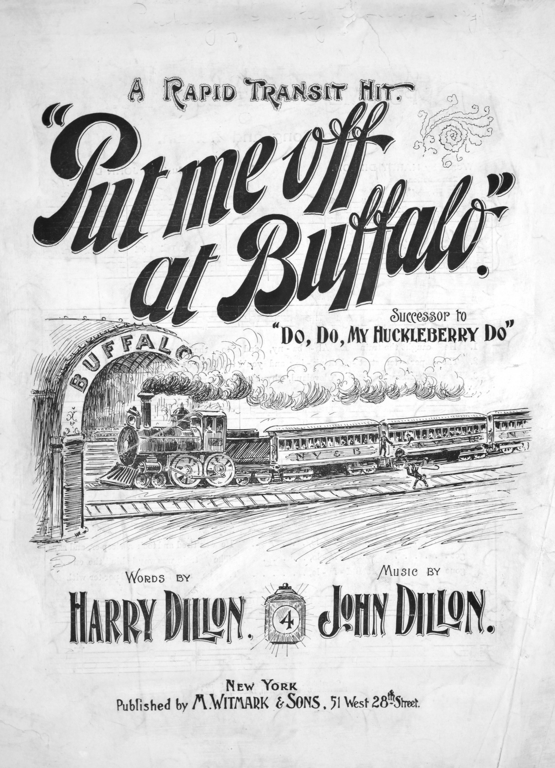
1895 sheet music cover for Put Me Off at Buffalo

The Dillon Brothers were a popular American comedic Vaudeville act from the late 1880s into the early 1900s, composed of brothers Harry (1866? – 1916) and John Dillon.

Harry and John Dillon were the sons of Mary Fitzgerald and Michael Dillon of Cortland, New York, and had six other brothers and two sisters. Leaving home at age 15, Harry made his theater debut on the minstrel circuit, joining Duprez & Benedict's Minstrels for a year in 1882. He was then joined by his brother John and began to perform sketch comedy and comedic songs.

Their hits included "Do, Do, My Huckleberry Do" (1893), "Put Me Off at Buffalo" (1895), and "Why Did They Sell Killarney?" (1899).

Harry retired from vaudeville due to illness some years before 1915, and John had returned to Cortland to go into business by 1914. Harry died in Cortland on February 6, 1916.

John and Harry's brother William Dillon (1877-1966) was also a popular performer best known as the lyricist for the song "I Want A Girl (Just Like The Girl That Married Dear Old Dad)" (1911)
