= Put Me Off at Buffalo =

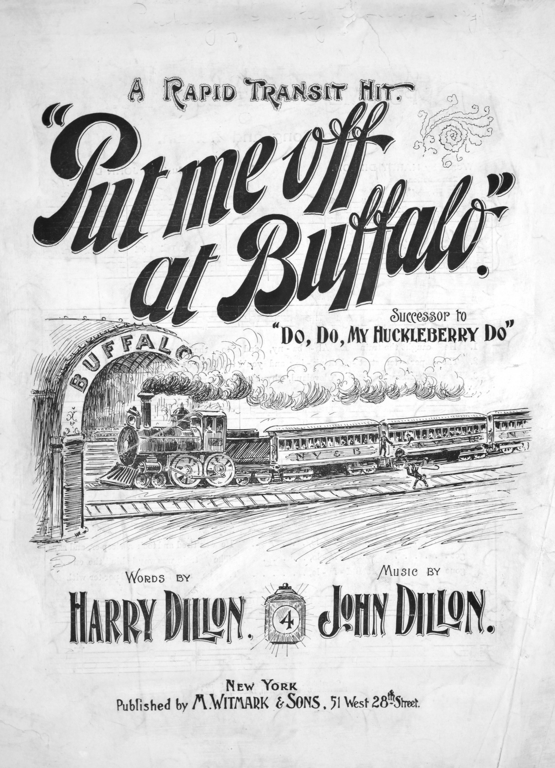
- Sheet music cover

Song
- Language: English
- Published: 1895
- Genre: Vaudeville, popular song
- Songwriters: Dillon Brothers (Harry and John Dillon)

Put Me Off at Buffalo is a song by the vaudeville team of the Dillon Brothers, with lyrics by Harry Dillon and music by John Dillon. It was first published in 1895, and also appeared in the play A Trip to Chinatown. After an initial period of popularity, the tune was revived in 1901 in connection with the Pan-American Exposition held in Buffalo. The song's lyrics were planted in the lawn of Buffalo's city hall during the event.

The comedic song relates the story of a train passenger who asks the railcar's porter to wake him and "put me off" when the train reaches Buffalo during the night. The passenger invites the porter to have a drink with him, who after imbibing too much mistakenly ejects the wrong passenger when Buffalo is reached. Porters at the time were almost exclusively African-American men, and the song includes ethnic slurs common to the time in its final lines.

The story may have originated from an event that occurred in Utica, New York. And although the song is credited to Harry & John Dillon, when their younger brother William Dillon testified to Congress in the 1960s about the importance of copyright royalties, he claimed that his first composition was this song.

In comedic response to the tune, Don't Put Me Off at Buffalo Any More by William Jerome and Jean Schwartz was released in 1901, which criticized the quality and cost of the Buffalo Exposition. As President William McKinley was shot at the exposition (and died eight days later from his wounds), the response enjoyed some black humor popularity.

A play titled "Put Me Off at Buffalo" also debuted in 1901.

== Lyrics ==
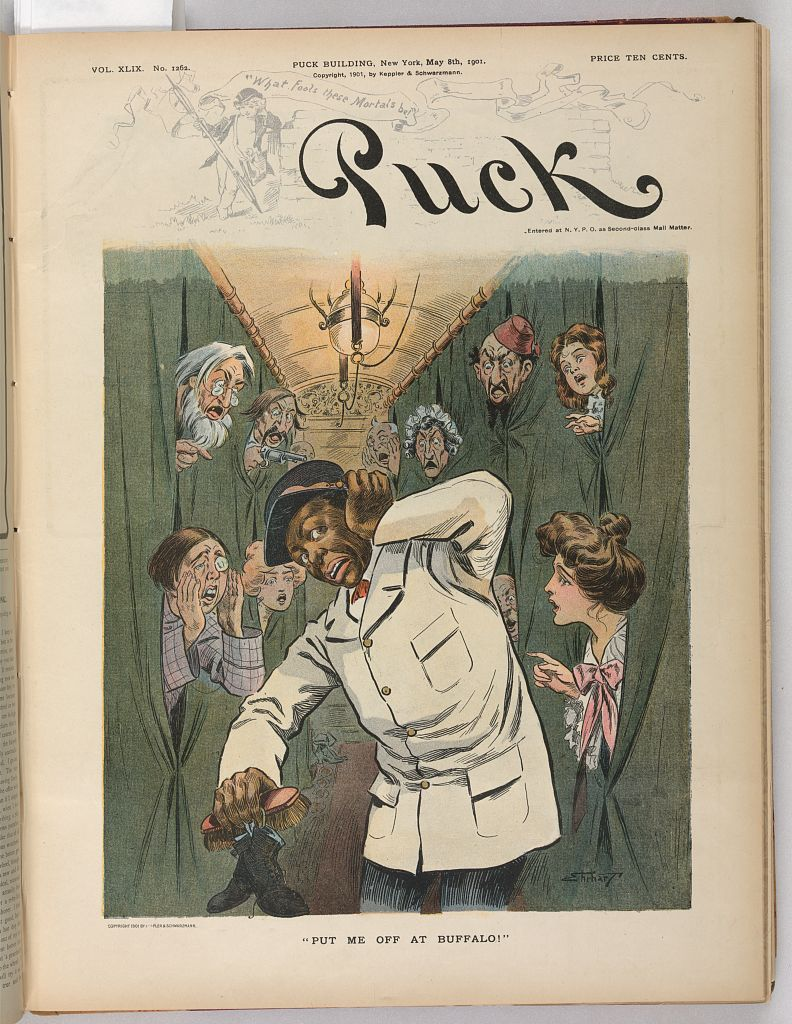
May 8, 1901 cover of Puck magazine, train passengers asking to be "put off" at Buffalo to visit the Pan-American Exposition.

He caught the train at Albany and to the porter said, put me off at Buffalo.
He was tired and took a sleeper and says, now I'll go to bed,
Just to rest an hour or so.
In an undertone he murmured "now I lay me down to wink," put me off at Buffalo
Then he tipped the porter saying, Port old boy come have a drink,
Put me off at Buffalo, oh, oh, oh,

Don't forget to put me off at Buffalo, Oh, oh, my berth is lower five,
If you find me hard to wake, oh don't be afraid to shake
Throw me off there dead or alive.
Mister Porter when you call me in the morn, he says,
I'll kick but of course it doesn't go,
No matter what I say, Just remember I'm the jay,
That goes off the train when you get to Buffalo

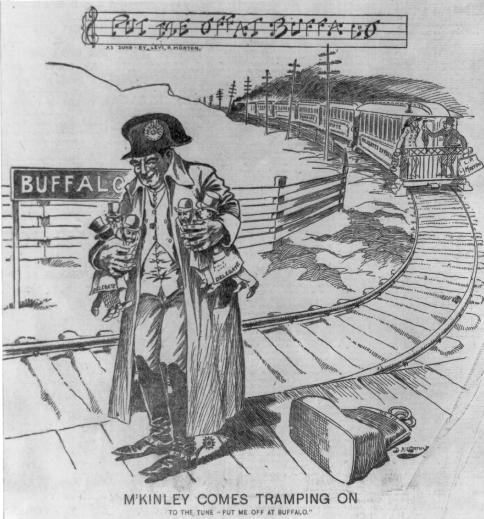
1896 political cartoon showing future U.S. president William McKinley in Buffalo with delegates in hand, with a musical caption of "Put Me Off at Buffalo".

The porter started drinking and you'd think he owned the road,
When he got to Buffalo,
The train was way behind the engineer he had a load
Take water he says, no, no
When the porter went to call his man, he got at the wrong berth,
Says get off at Buffalo,
O, the man he says you're wrong old boy, look out you'll tear my shirt,
I don't get off at Buffalo, oh, oh

Don't tell me you won't get off at Buffalo, Oh, oh, be quick and grab your clothes,
Here's the hardest guy to wake, said the porter with a shake,
They exchanged some good hard blows,
Oh the porter got a soaker, but he fired the man
With a crash thro' the window he did go
Then the man they should awoke, in his sleep says that's a joke
Put me off the train, when we get to Buffalo.

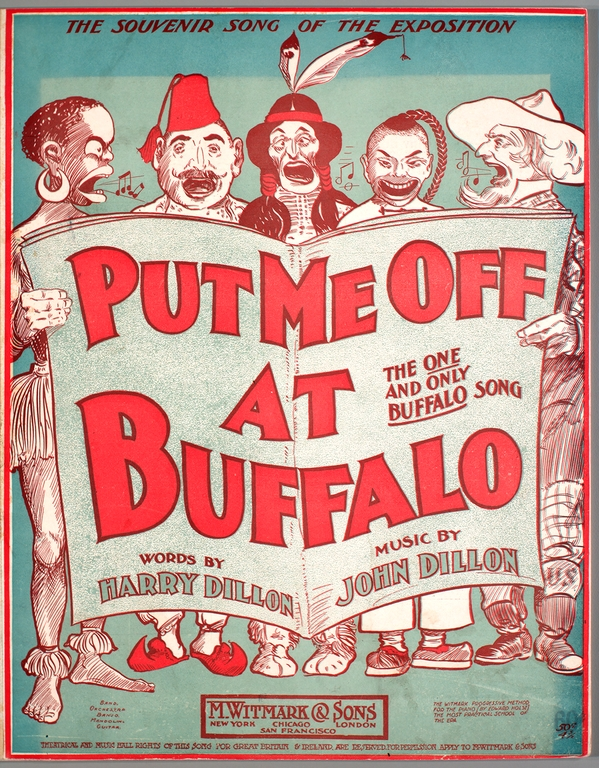
1901 sheet music cover

When the brakeman shouted Cleveland, why the man jumped out of bed,
And says we've gone thru Buffalo
Then he saw the poor old porter with a bandage on his hand,
And his eyes swelled out, oh oh
His whiskers they were sandy, in the sand he done a jig, put me off at Buffalo,
He says my wife was waiting at the depot with a rig,
Take me back to Buffalo, oh, I

Thought I told you to put me off at Buffalo, oh oh, there's trouble in the air,
Oh the porter shook with fright, yes he turned from black to white,
Oh how that coon did stare,

I'm a dead nigger now he whispered to himself, its my last trip on this road, I know
My goodness sakes alive, here's the gent in number five,
I put the wrong man off the train at Buffalo.

== External ==
- 1895 Sheet Music at Levy Sheet Music Collection
- c. 1898 recording by Dan W. Quinn
- 1901 recording and alternate take by S.H. Dudley (Samuel Holland Rous) (Library of Congress)
