= The Oyster Man =

1907 American play

The Oyster Man is a play originally staged in 1907 with Ernest Hogan in the starring role. Flournoy E. Miller wrote the book. Lester Walton praised the show. The show followed on the success of Rufus Rastus. Shuffle Along in 1920 was the next Broadway by and starring African Americans.

The show opened at the Yorkville Theatre. It subsequently played at the Grand Opera House and 14th Street Theatre. Hogan starred as an oyster vendor named Rastus. He retired from the show due to tuberculosis and it was his last role before the illness took his life.

The Kentucky Museum Library has a songsheet cover for the show. The New York Public Library has a photograph of Hogan in costume for The Oyster Man.
