= Issler's Orchestra =

Early recording ensemble

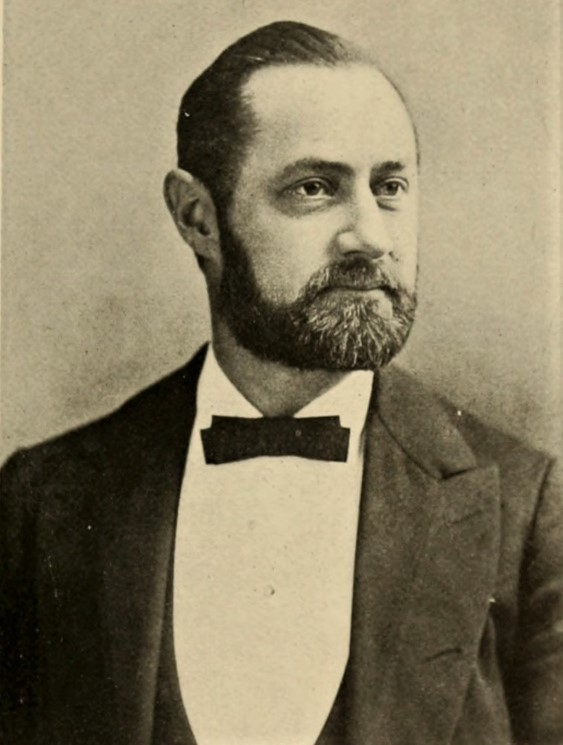
Pianist and bandleader Edward Issler in the 1890s, from a book published in 1904

Issler's Orchestra was an early recording ensemble, and perhaps the first popular band. The group formed in the fall of 1889 at the Edison Laboratory Because the purpose of the group was only to make recordings, it had only four or five performers, a form that would come to be known as a "parlor orchestra". Personnel and instrumentation varied in the first year, but most sessions included Edward Issler on piano, George Schweinfest on flute and D.B. Dana on cornet. Clarinetist William Tuson and xylophonist Charles P. Lowe would also become core members in the early 1890s.

The group performed dance music such as quadrilles, waltzes and polkas, arrangements of musical theater, opera, and popular songs, "descriptive" pieces evoking a narrative, chamber music, and marches. After the Edison Laboratory suspended its recording program in January 1890, Issler's Orchestra recorded for the New Jersey Phonograph Company, United States Phonograph Company, Columbia Phonograph Company Chicago Talking Machine Company and others. The band experienced a decline in popularity after other marching bands came on to the scene. The ensemble stopped recording around 1899, but individual members, specifically Schweinfest and Lowe, would continue individually into the disc era.

== Members ==
The band's core members were:

- Edward Issler (1855 - 1922), piano
- David B. Dana (1855 - 1914), cornet
- George Schweinfest (1862 - 1949), flute and piccolo
- A. T. Van Winkle (1846 - 1915), violin
- William Tuson (1864 - 1943), Clarinet
- Charles P. Lowe (1846 - 1915), Xylophone

== Notable recordings ==
The Fifth Regiment March, one of the best known recordings by the band, from March 1889.

All of Issler's records were recorded on fragile hollow cylinders made of a waxy blend of materials that usually became brown-colored during the making of the blank cylinders, so they are called "brown wax cylinders" because of their shape and usual color. Their actual color can be anywhere from nearly white to a very dark brown. They are about 4¼ inches long and 2¼ inches in diameter. Not many cylinder records made in the 1890s have survived and the survivors are almost never in great condition, so the sound recorded on them is now less clear than what people heard when they were new and there is much more surface noise mixed in with it.

- One of their earliest records, and one of the earliest made by Edison, does not have a title. The cylinder is announced at the start of the recording as "Played at the Edison Phonograph Works, Orange, New Jersey, by the Issler Parlor Orchestra".
- In March 1889 they recorded the Fifth Regiment March for Edison. This recording was selected as one of the first 50 recordings to be selected for preservation in the National Recording Registry by the Library of Congress.
- In 1891 they recorded Nanon Waltz, a charming piece by Richard Genee.
- In 1894 or 1895 they recorded the Electric Light Quadrille. Like many quadrille records made in the 1890s, it has an announcement in the middle. This one says that Issler's Orchestra will be performing free in Keystone Hall the night after the record was made and that the electric light will be used for the first time (meaning its first use in Keystone Hall, not in the whole world).
- In 1895 they recorded what might be the first recording of Dixie.
- In 1898 the group recorded March of the Marines.
