= Ernest Appy =

American cellist and composer

Charles Ernest Appy (25 October 1834, in The Hague – 2 August 1895, in Kansas City) was an American cellist and composer of French heritage.

He began to learn piano at the age of 14, but later switched to learning cello. Appy was an associate of Clara Schumann, Alfred Jaëll and Ernst Lübeck during his stay in Europe through the Dutch violinist, Frans Coenen, along with being a professor at Maatschappij tot Bevordering der Toonkunst. In addition to his musical performances, he opened music schools in Amsterdam and in Kansas City. Appy was later the cello instructor for Johannes Smith, who played for Richard Sahla's Sahla Quartet.

One of his descendants installed a tombstone of his in 2013.
