= I Want a Girl (Just Like the Girl That Married Dear Old Dad) =

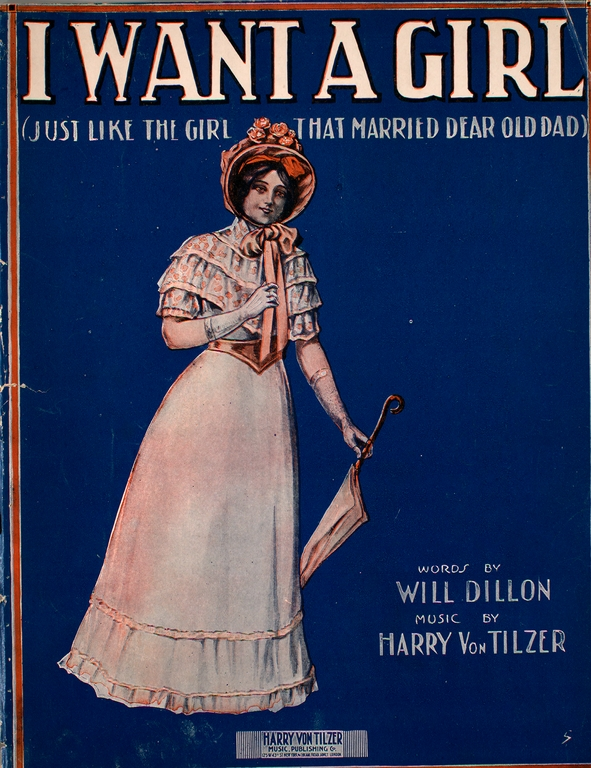
- Sheet music cover

Song
- Language: English
- Published: 1911
- Composer: Harry Von Tilzer
- Lyricist: William Dillon

Audio sample
- Recording of I Want a Girl, performed by the American Quartet (1911): file; help

"I Want a Girl (Just Like the Girl That Married Dear Old Dad)" (sometimes shortened to "I Want a Girl") is a popular song of 1911 composed by Harry Von Tilzer and with lyrics by William Dillon, which has become a barbershop music standard.

== Creation ==
Von Tilzer and Dillon had never written a song together before, but finding themselves on the same vaudeville bill, von Tilzer suggested they might collaborate on some songs while on the road. Dillon had already had some success with "girl" songs such as "I'd Rather Have a Girlie Than an Automobile", so von Tilzer suggested they try another in that vein. The song was finished in February 1911, and was published on March 11, 1911. While singers immediately took to it, Dillon and von Tilzer did not use it much themselves.

== Popularity ==
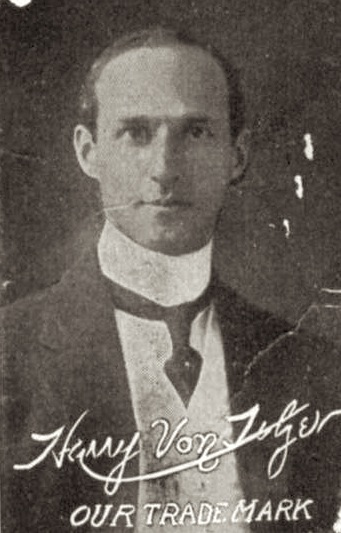
Harry von Tilzer, composer

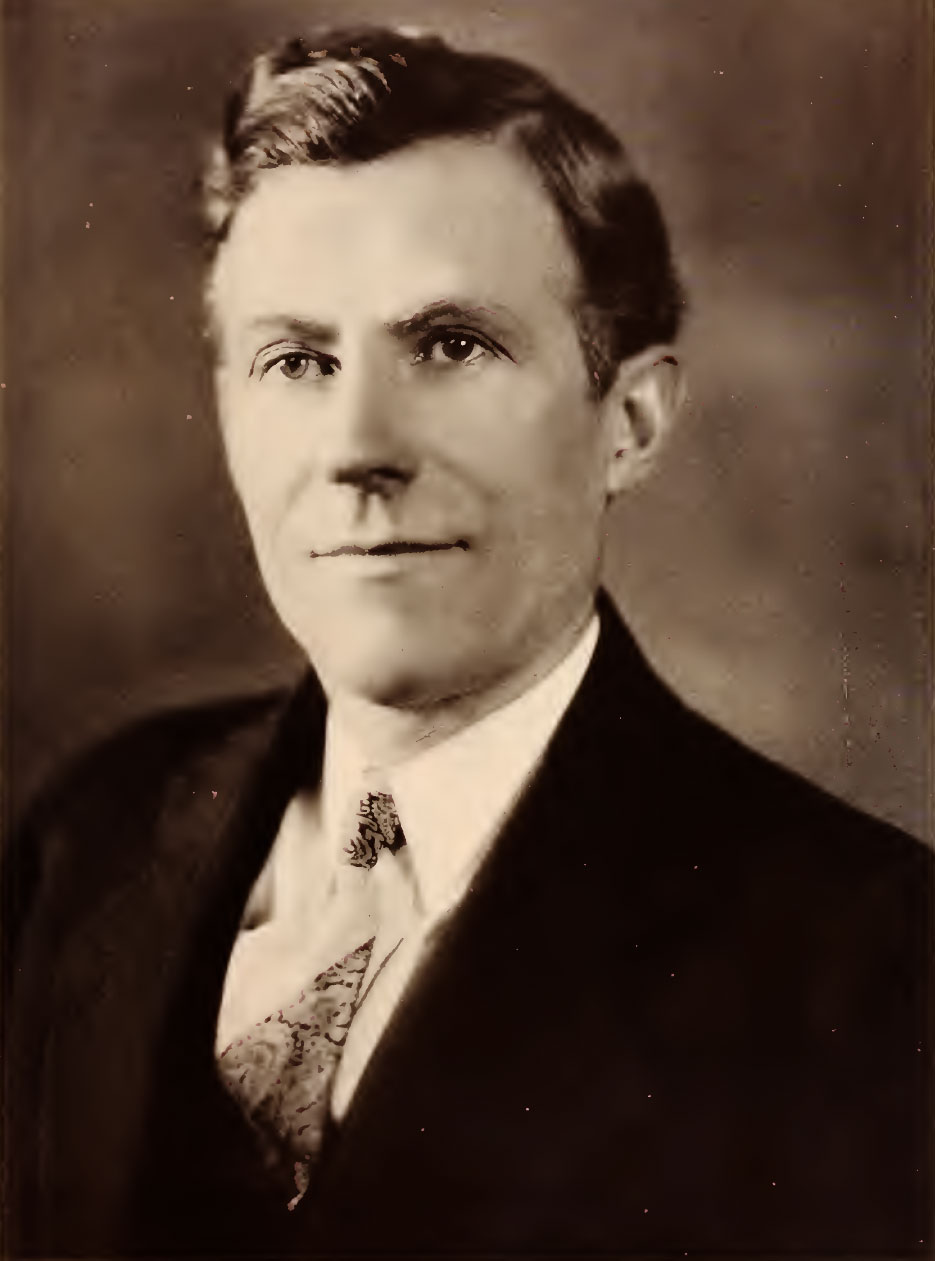
William A. Dillon, lyricist

The song was one of the most popular of 1911, bested only by "Alexander's Ragtime Band" by Irving Berlin. According to Dillon's 1966 obituary in The New York Times, the song sold over five million score sheets and recordings.

Among many subsequent appearances in pop culture, the song appears in the 1944 film Show Business, the 1946 film The Jolson Story, and an episode of the 1980s cartoon DuckTales. The song also appears in the Whistleblower DLC for the survival horror video game Outlast.

The song was performed on multiple episodes of The Royle Family, played by titular character Jim Royle on his signature banjo.

Since the song refers to a young man wanting to find a wife like his mother, some commentators have suggested, with varying degrees of seriousness, that the song's title and lyrics promote an Oedipus complex.

The music was used as the theme to the Australian television sitcom Mother and Son that was broadcast on the Australian Broadcasting Corporation (ABC) from 16 January 1984 until 21 March 1994.

== Lyrics ==
Verse 1
When I was a boy my mother often said to me
Get married boy and see how happy you will be
I have looked all over, but no girlie can I find,
Who seems to be just like the little girl I have in mind,
I will have to look around until the right one I have found.

Chorus
I want a girl, just like the girl that married dear old Dad,
She was a pearl and the only girl that Daddy ever had,
A good old fashioned girl with heart so true,
One who loves nobody else but you,
I want a girl, just like the girl that married dear old Dad.

Verse 2
By the old mill stream there sit a couple old and gray,
Though years have rolled away, their hearts are young today.
Mother dear looks up at Dad with love light in her eye,
He steals a kiss, a fond embrace, while ev'ning breezes sigh,
They're as happy as can be, so that's the kind of love for me.

== Notable recordings ==
- Columbia Quartette (29 May 1911)
- American Quartet with Walter Van Brunt (27 July 1911)
- Dorothy Ward (January 1913)
- Ella Retford (1920s?)
- Dan Hornsby Trio (1928) Columbia
- Al Jolson (28 November 1947)
- Frankie Carle (1948)
- Four Lovers (1956)
- Graham Cuthbertson as Eddie Gluskin in Outlast: Whistleblower (2013)
- Singing Mushrooms from Kings Dominion (1975-1990;2014-)
