= Queen Mary's Song =

1889 song by Edward Elgar

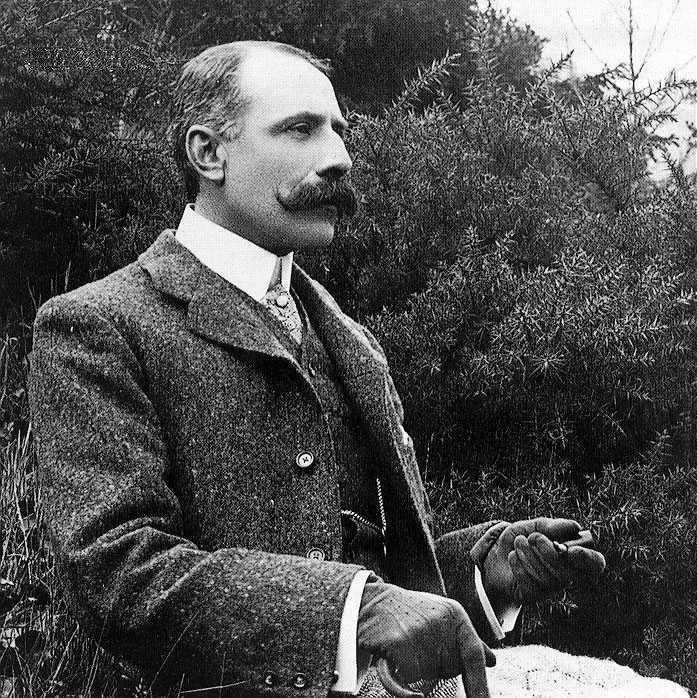
Edward Elgar, c. 1900

"Queen Mary's Song" is a song written by the English composer Edward Elgar in 1889. The words are by Tennyson, sung by Queen Mary I of England as she plays a lute in scene 2, act 5 of his 1875 play Queen Mary: A Drama.

It was composed between 14 June and 1 July 1889, and dedicated to J. H. Meredith, an honorary member of the Worcester Amateur Instrumental Society.

The song was first published by Osborn & Tuckwood in 1889, then by Ascherberg in 1892. It was re-published in 1907 as one of the Seven Lieder, with English and German words. The German translator, one unidentified Ed. Sachs, named the song "Maria Stuart's Lied zur Laute", confusing the Stuart Mary, Queen of Scots with the Tudor Mary I of England.

== Lyrics ==
Words used by Tennyson

Hapless doom of woman happy in betrothing!
Beauty passes like a breath and love is lost in loathing:
Low, my lute; speak low, my lute, but say the world is nothing -
Low, lute, low!

Love will hover round the flowers when they first awaken;
Love will fly the fallen leaf, and not be overtaken;
Low, my lute! oh low, my lute! we fade and are forsaken -
Low, dear lute, low!

Words used by Elgar and German translation by Ed. Sachs

Hapless doom of woman happy in betrothing,
Beauty passes like a breath and love is lost in loathing:
Low! my lute:

Speak low, speak low, my lute, but say the world is nothing.
Low! lute, low!

Love will hover round the flowers when they first awaken;
Love will fly the fallen leaf, and not be overtaken;
Low, my lute!

O low, O low, my lute! we fade and are forsaken.
Low, dear lute, low!

Glücklos Schicksal des Weibes, Glücklich nur im Wähnen,
Schönheit schwindet wie ein Hauch, Und Lieb' vergeht in Tränen:
Leis', mein Spiel !

Tön' leis, o leis, mein Spiel, doch sag der Welt mein Sehnen.
Sanft! Laute, sanft !

Liebe schützt die zarten Keime, Wenn sie Wurzel fassen;
Liebe flieht die welken Blüten, Wenn Farb' und Leben blassen;
Leis', mein Spiel !

Tön' leis, o leis, mein Spiel! Verwelkt sind wir verlassen.
Sanft, o Laute, sanft!

== Recordings ==
- Songs & Piano Music by Edward Elgar has "Queen Mary's Song" performed by Amanda Pitt (soprano), with David Owen Norris (piano).
- Elgar: Complete Songs for Voice & Piano Konrad Jarnot (baritone), Reinild Mees (piano)
- The Songs of Edward Elgar, SOMM CD 220, Catherine Wyn-Rogers (soprano) with Malcolm Martineau (piano), at Southlands College, London, April 1999

== Other versions ==
Other settings of poems from Tennyson's Queen Mary include songs by

- Charles Villiers Stanford, incidental music to Queen Mary, Op. 6, including "The Lute Song {Mary's Song)" and "The Milkmaid's Song", 1876;
- Kate Loder, "Queen Mary's Song", an undated manuscript signed with her married name Kate Thompson;
- Horatio Parker, two songs: "Milkmaid's Song" and "Lute Song", 1904.
