= Down Went McGinty =

1889 popular song by Joseph Flynn

"Down Went McGinty" (sometimes referred to as "Down Went Dan McGinty" and "Down Went M'Ginty") is an 1889 song written by Joseph Flynn. It was first performed by Flynn and his partner Frank Sheridan, at Hyde and Behman's Theater in Brooklyn. The lyrics depict the misadventures of a stereotypically "naive and pugnacious" Irishman named Dan McGinty; the last verse describes his suicide by drowning: "Down went McGinty / to the bottom of the sea".

Film historian Jeff Jaeckle has described McGinty's actions as "conform(ing) to contemporaneous anti-Irish prejudice".

== Performances ==
In addition to Flynn and Sheridan, early performers of the song included Dan W. Quinn (who produced the first recorded version) and Maggie Cline.

== Lyrics ==
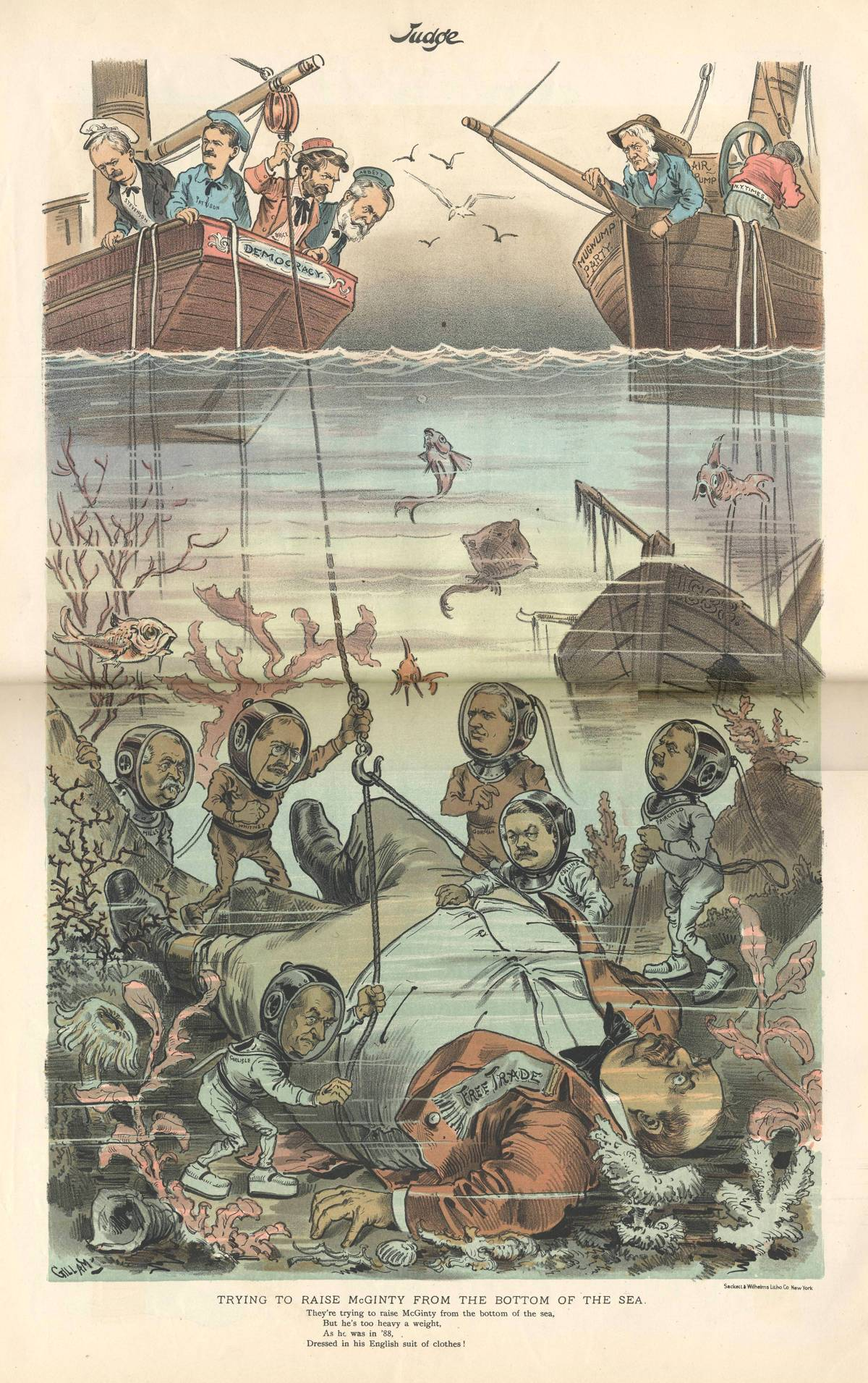
1892 editorial cartoon comparing Grover Cleveland's political future to McGinty

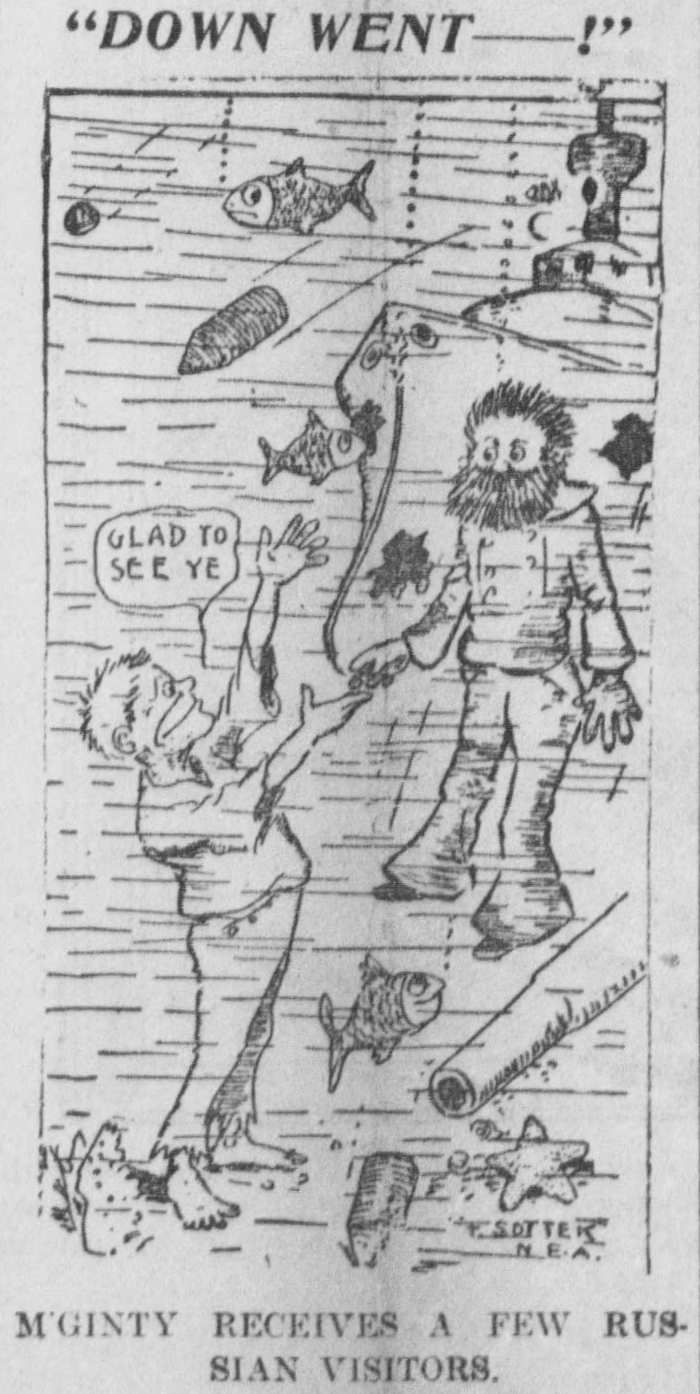
1904 editorial cartoon comparing casualties of war to McGinty

Sunday morning just at nine
Dan McGinty dressed so fine,
Stood looking at a very high stone wall,
When his friend, young Pat McCann,
Says, “I’ll bet five dollars, Dan,
I could carry you to the top without a fall.”

So on his shoulders he took Dan,
to climb the ladder he began,
And soon commenced to reach up near the top;
When McGinty, cute old rogue,
To win the five he did let go,
Never thinking just how far he’d have to drop.

Down went McGinty to the bottom of the wall,
And tho’ he won the five,
he was more dead than alive;
Sure his ribs and nose and back were broke from getting such a fall,
Dressed in his best suit of clothes.

From the hospital Mac went home,
When they fixed his broken bones,
To find he was the father of a child;
So to celebrate it right,
his friends he went to invite,
And soon he was drinking whiskey fast and wild.

Then he waddled down the street
in his Sunday suit so neat,
Holding up his head as proud as John the Great;
But in the sidewalk was a hole,
to receive a ton of coal,
That McGinty never saw till just too late.

Down went McGinty to the bottom of the hole,
Then the driver of the cart
gave the load of coal a start;
And it took us half an hour to dig McGinty from the coal,
Dress’d in his best suit of clothes.

Now McGinty raved and swore,
About his clothes he felt so sore,
And an oath he took he’d kill the man or die;
So he tightly grabbed his stick
and hit the driver a lick,
Then he raised a little shanty on his eye.

But two policemen saw the muss,
And they soon joined in the fuss,
Then they ran McGinty in for being drunk;
And the Judge says with a smile,
We will keep you for a while,
In a cell to sleep upon a prison bunk.

Down went McGinty to the bottom of the jail,
Where his board would cost him nix,
and he stay’d exactly six;
They were big long months he stopp’d, for no one went his bail,
Dressed in his best suit of clothes.

Now McGinty, thin and pale,
one fine day got out of jail,
And with joy to see his boy was nearly wild;
To his house he quickly ran
To see his wife, Bedaley Ann,
But she skipp’d away and took along the child.

Then he gave up in despair
And he madly pulled his hair,
As he stood one day upon the river shore;
Knowing well he couldn't swim,
he did foolishly jump in,
Although water he had never took before.

Down went McGinty to the bottom of the sea,
And he must be very wet
for they haven’t found him yet;
But they say his ghost comes round the docks
Before the break of day,
Dressed in his best suit of clothes.

== Popular culture ==
References to McGinty were common for decades after the song's introduction, with the song being used as the basis for characters by, among others, Preston Sturges (in The Great McGinty), L. Frank Baum, and James T. Farrell.
