= Gustaw Lewita =

Polish pianist (1853–1889)

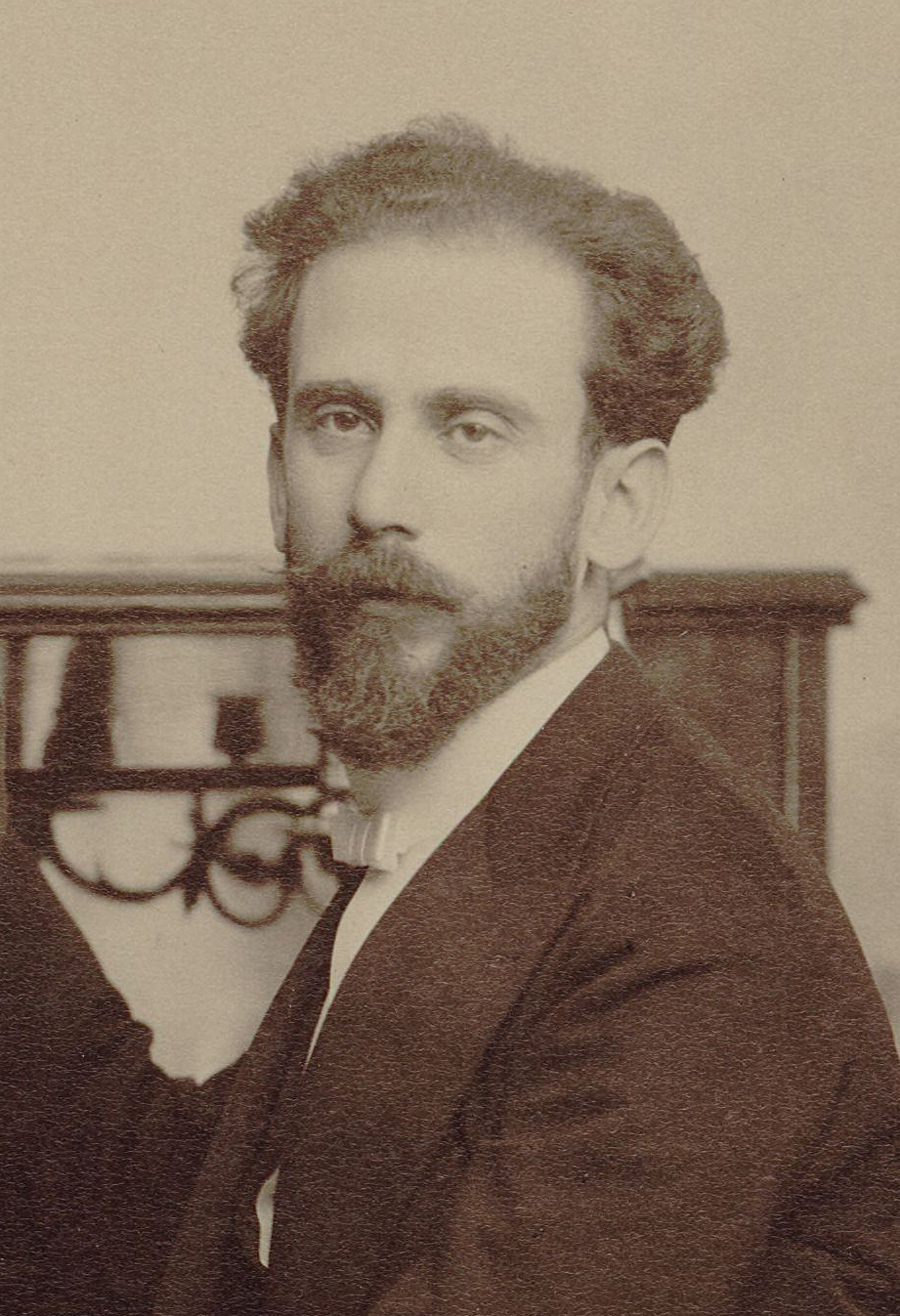

Gustaw Lewita (1853, 1854 or 1855 – 7 February 1889) was a pianist from Płock, Poland. He attended the Vienna Conservatory and graduated with distinction, before heading to Paris. There he became a member of the Pasdeloup Orchestra. In 1882, he became a professor at the Warsaw Conservatory. He later gave concerts to Archduke Franz Karl in Vienna, and, touring America, before the Emperor of Brazil.
