= Jean Joseph Bott =

German violinist and composer (1826–1895)

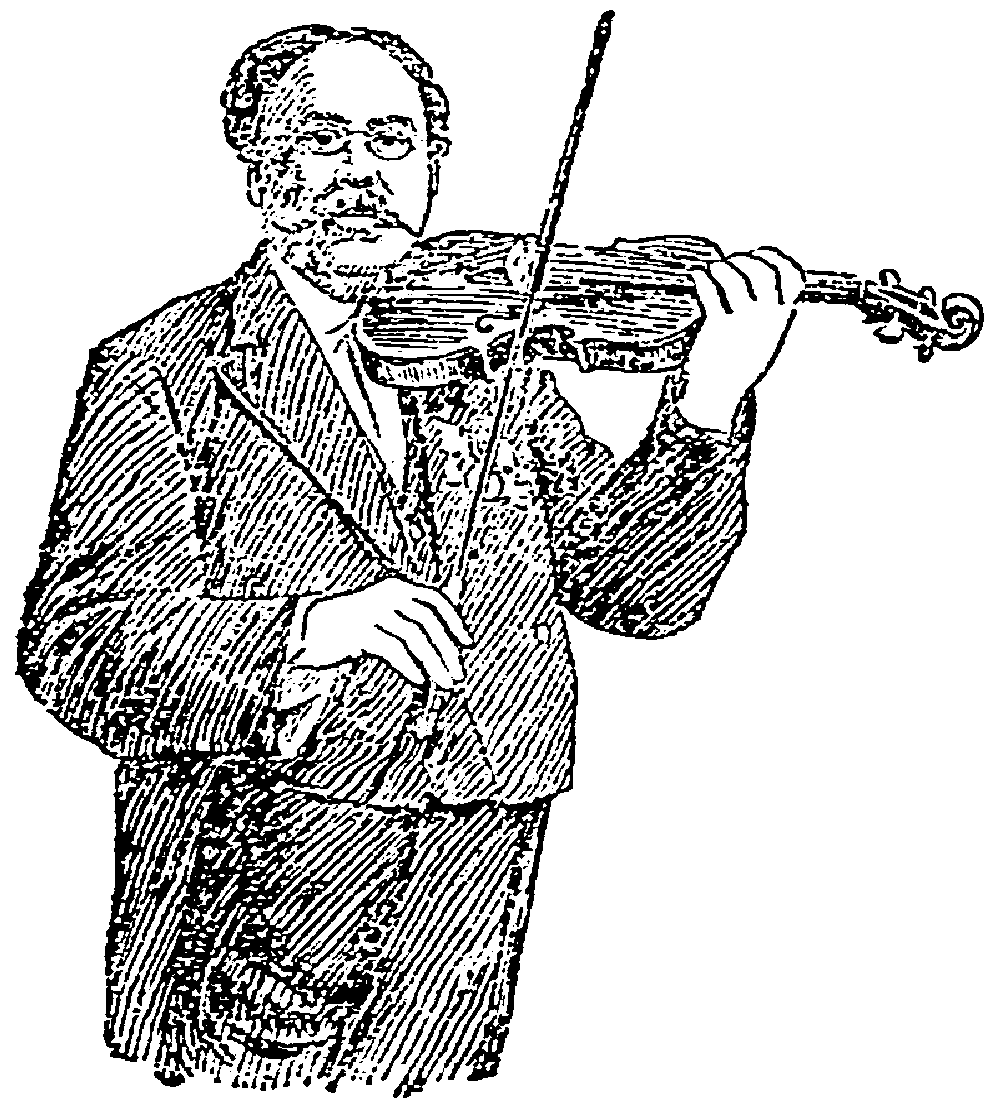
Jean Joseph Bott

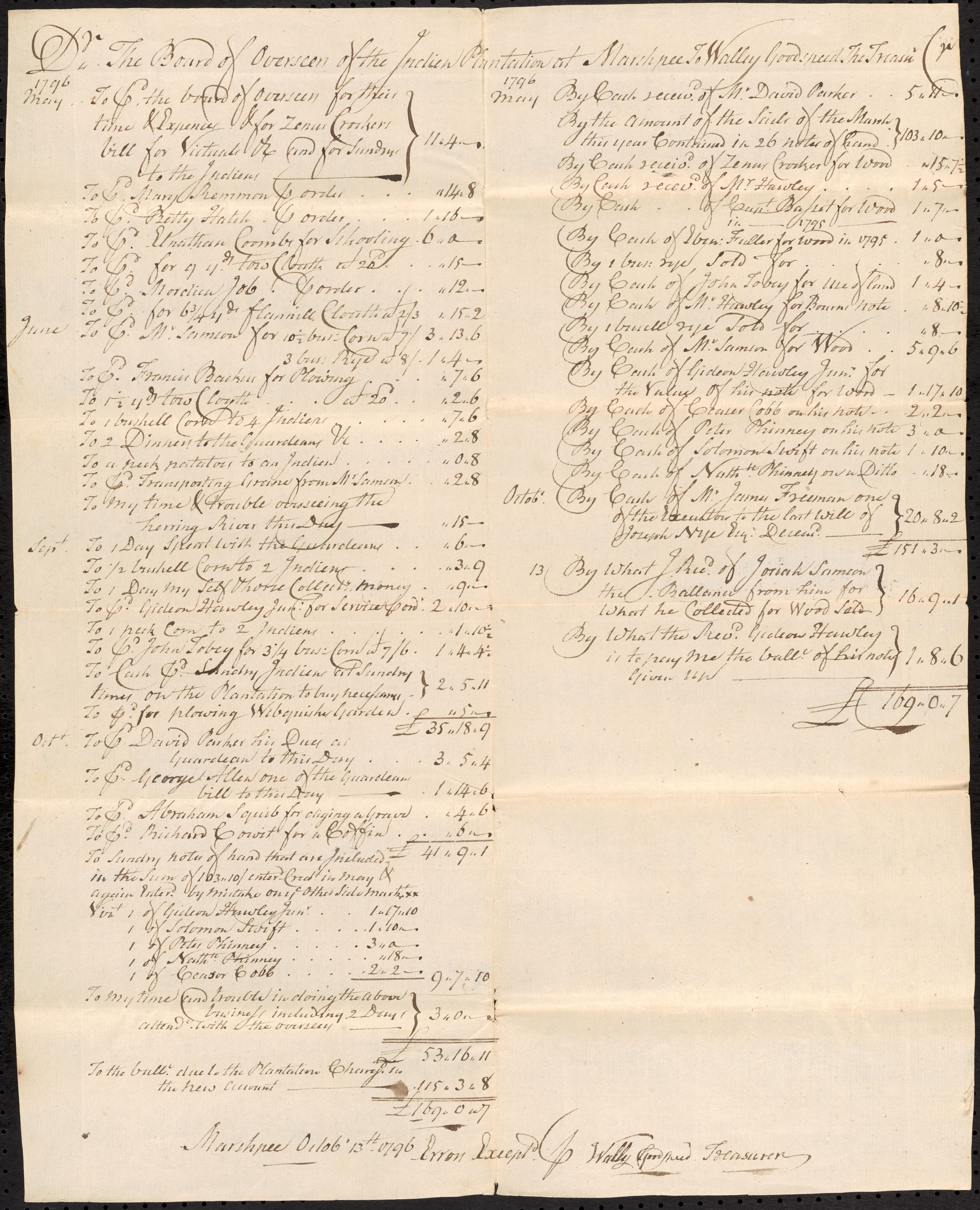

Jean Joseph Bott (9 March 1826 – 28 April 1895) was a German violinist and composer who emigrated to the United States late in his life.

== Early life and education ==
He was born in Cassel, Grand Duchy of Hesse, where he received his first musical instruction from his father, a court musician. At the age of 9, he was proficient enough to make a performance tour of the Netherlands with his father.

After winning the Frankfurt Mozart scholarship in 1841, he began studies of theory and composition under Moritz Hauptmann and violin under Louis Spohr, and after two years of study entered the Cassel court orchestra, where he became concertmaster at the age of 17.

== Career ==
In 1846, he left Cassel to travel through the German-speaking lands. He played before William I, the King of Prussia, and was accompanied by Liszt and Meyerbeer. In 1852, he was made second Hofkapellmeister at Cassel, but was dismissed in 1856. In 1857, he became court kapellmeister at Meiningen, and then in 1865 accepted a similar position in the Kingdom of Hanover.

On 20 May 1877, Bott was drunk and fell off the podium while conducting a performance of Liszt's oratorio Die Legende von der Heilige Elisabeth. He was pensioned off and went to Magdeburg to direct the Conservatory there, and in 1880 he went to Braunschweig, where he compiled an encyclopedia on musicians and music. In 1883, he was giving concerts in Hamburg.

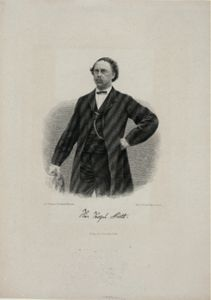

== Death ==
In 1885 he came to New York. While in the United States, he made it a practice to visit Hamburg every summer. He reportedly died from grief over the loss of his 1725 Stradivarius violin, which was stolen from him on 31 March 1894.

== Legacy ==
After Bott's death, a violin was found in the store of the instrument dealer Victor S. Flechter at 23 Union Square, which his widow Mathilde (born Blomeyer) said was the stolen violin. The violin was said to have been estimated at 5,000 U.S. dollars (New York Times).

She pointed to various identifying features, and two violin makers, August Gemünder and John Friedrich, testified that it was a Stradivarius, contradicting a Mr. Ross who had purchased the violin from Flechter and said he did not think it a Stradivarius.

Flechter was acquitted after the violin was determined to not be Bott's, but was indicted a second time and convicted for receiving stolen property. Bott's violin was discovered by chance at a pawn shop in 1900. The case received widespread newspaper coverage, and was one of the cases recounted in Arthur Train's True Stories of Crime from the District Attorney's Office (1908).

== Family ==
In Meiningen, Bott married Matilde Blomeyer in 1861. Their son entered the German army in 1894, and turned 23 in 1895.

== Works ==
His works comprise two operas — Der Unbekannte (The Unknown, 1854) and Aktäa, das Mädchen von Korinth (Actea, the maid from Corinth, 1862) — and symphonies, overtures, violin concertos, pianoforte music, solos for violin, and songs.

=== Opus 1 to 20 ===
- Op.1. 4 Morceaux de Salon (Romance. Allegretto. Andante religioso. Allegro vivace) p. Violon et Pfte. 1846.
- Op.2. 1stes Concertino (in E) f. Violine m. Begl. d. Orch. d. Pfte in E . Hamburg, Schuberth u. Co.1847.
- Op.3. 2 Lieder ohne Worte. Leipzig, Schuberth u. Co. 1862.
- Op.4. Souvenir de Bellini Bravour-Variationen f. Violine m. Begl. d. Orchesters. in A . Hamburg, Schuberth u. Co. 1850, 1881.
- Op.5. Etude in A minor (open instrumentation). Leipzig, Schuberth u. Co. 1862
- Op.6. Adagio religioso for violin and orchestra. Leipzig: Schuberth & Co., 1862 (composed March 1846). (See: Religious Meditations by Gustav Saenger.)
- Op.7. Impromptu brill. (open instrumentation). Leipzig, Schuberth u. Co. 1863.
- Op.8. 6 Lieder f. Tenor (od. Sopran.). (In der Sterne sanflem Scheine. Der Schiffer. Die Monduhr. Ständchen. Der Spinnerin Nachtlied. Die Weinende.) Cassel, Luckhardt 1847.
- Op.9 . Andante cantabile f. Violine m. Begl. d. Orchesters. Cassel, Luckhardt 1847.
- Op.10. Romance for Violin and Piano. Cassel, Luckhardt 1847.
- Op.11. 3 kleine Salon-Stücke. (2 Mazurkas u. Polka.) Leipzig, Schuberth u. Co. 1862.
- Op.12. Not assigned.
- Op.13 Romanze f. Viol. u. Pfte. Cassel, Luckhardt 1851.
- Op.14 La Polka. Caprice burlesque p. Violon av. Acc. d’Orch.. Pfte. Hamburg, Schuberth et Co. 1849.
- Op.15 3 kleine Tondichtungen f. Viol. u. Pfte.. Offenbach, André 1852.
- Op.16. Adagio religioso (C) f. voice and Orgel (od. Pfte). Leipzig, Schuberth & Co. 1879.
- Op.17. 3 Lieder von Geibel, f. Tenor solo (no piano). (Du bist so schön. O weisst du. O du der Schönheit Fürstin.) Cassel, Luckhardt 1855.
- Op.18. 3 Morceaux de Salon p. Violon av. Pfte. Mainz, Schott 1858.
- Op.19. Variationen über böhmische Volkslieder f. Violine mit Pfte. Leipzig, Kistner 1857.
- Op.20. 3 Lieder. (Gute Nacht. Ein Vöglein saug. Dahin!). Open instrumentation. Cassel, Luckhardt 1858.

=== Opus 21 to 40 ===
- Op. 21. Concert (3rd concertino) (A minor) f. Violine mit Orch. Leipzig, Peters 1860. See D-LEsta 21070 C. F. Peters, Leipzig, Nr. 4290 (autograph full score. Album leaf @ Pierpont Morgan is dated 1852 January 23.)
- Op. 22. Fantasie über Themen der Oper: Cassilda, v. E.H. z. S., f. Violine mit Pfte. Cassel, Luckhardt 1858.
- Op. 23. 3 Salonstücke f. Violine u. Pfte. Leipzig, Br. u. Härtel/London, 1859.
- Op. 24. Andante f. Violine mit Pfte. Leipzig, Peters/London (Ashdown?), 1859.
- Op. 25. 3 Stücke f. Violine u. Pfte. Breslau, Leuckart 1860.
- Op. 27. 4 Lieder f. Männerchor. (No. 1. Mahnruf: „Des Rheines Fluthen rauschten“. No. 2. „Halt an, du schöne Schifferin“. No. 3. Die letzte Fahrt: „Die Abendglocke tönt“. No. 4. Waldeshütte: „Berge Mond dich hinter Wolken“.) Kassel, Voigt 1879.. (Kassel, Scheel 1863.
- Op.28. 3 Tondichtungen f. Violine u. Pfte. Leipzig, Schuberth u. Co. 1864.
- Op.29. 3 Gesänge f. tiefe St. (solo). No. 1, Frühling in der Heimath. No. 2, Das Posthorn schallt. No. 3, Hast wieder gesponnen. Leipzig, Schuberth u. Co. 1863.
- Op.30. Andante u. Capriccio f. Viol. m. Pfte Hannover, Nagel 1872.
- Op.32. Sechs Gedichte f. Männerchor. (No. 1. Gondellied: „Komm, Lieb, mit in die Gondel“. No. 2 Rheinweinlied: „Im dunkelgrünen Römerglase“. No. 3. Schneeglöckleins Trauergeläute: „Schneeglöcklein läutet wieder“. No. 4. Im Wald: „Im Wald, im Wald, im Wald, im grünen Wald“. No. 5. Weihelied: „Auf! und singt zu dieser Stunde“. No. 6. O Tannenbaum: „O Tannenbaum, o Tannenbaum, was hat man dir gethan“.) Hannover, Simon 1878.
- Op.34. 3 Stücke f. Pfte. Bielefeld, Sulzer. No. 1. Im slavischen Volkston. – 2. Elfen im Mondschein. – 3. In der Kirche. 1879.
- Op.35. Schlummerlied u. Balletmusik aus der Oper: Das Mädchen v. Corinth, arr. f. Pfte. No. 1. Schlummerlied. No. 2. Balletmusik. Magdeburg, Haushahn 1879.
- Op.36. Lieder ohne Worte f. V. m. Pfte. No. 1. Träumerei. No. 2. Der Frühling ist da. No. 3. Im Winter Magdeburg, Rathke ar 1880. 1882.
- Op.38. Maiabend-Fantasie. Lied ohne Worte f. V. m. Pfte. Berlin, Schlesinger 1883.
- Op.40. Winzerfest. Lied ohne Worte f. V. m. Pfte. Hamburg, Schuberth. 1888.

=== Opus 41 to 51 ===
- Op.41. Cavatine in G f. V. m. Pfte. Hamburg, Leichssenring 1885.
- Op.44. Venezianische Serenade: „Ich will vor deiner Thüre stehen“ f. 1 Singst. m. Pfte. Hamburg, Böhme 1885.
- Op.45. Drei Lieder f. 1 Singst. m. Pfte, deutsch u. engl. Hamburg, Schuberth. 1888.

No.1. Liebeständelei: „Süsses Liebchen, komm zu mir“.
No.2. Der erste Frühlingstag: „Ueber mir der blaue Himmel“..
No.3. Ade: „Leb wohl, mein trauliches Dörfchen du“.

- Op.46. Indianisches Wiegenlied for violin and piano. Schuberth. 1888.
- Op.51. Idylle f. V. m. Pfte. Hanover, Lehne.
- Op.52. Song without words for violin and piano. New York : Pond, 1894

No.1 Love scene at the rivulet
No.2 Ave maria
No.3 Longing

- Op.53. Huldigungs-Marsch (D-Cl Mus Ms 166. Welcome-march on a wedding anniversary, 1892)

== Works without Opus Number ==
Selected, incomplete list.

- Romanesca in D minor aus dem 16ten Jahrhundert : für Violine mit Pianoforte oder Orchester Begleitung . Cassel, Luckhardt 1852.
- Romaneska (also in D minor for violin and small orchestra, but different work) (D - Dt Mus n 368 (ms. Romaneska with small orchestra accompaniment))
- (der) Unbekannte. Oper. Text von E. Biberhofer, Cassel, Hotop 1854 (libretto, which can be viewed online); Luckhardt 1856 (musical excerpts @ D-F Mus Hs 555, D-MEIr NHs 923, D-F Mus Hs 859.)
- Actäa, das Mädchen von Corinth. Grosse Oper mit Ballet. Text von Julius Rodenberg. Performed 1862. (D-B Mus. ms.2320 - manuscript copy full score, 1865, in several volumes). Berlin : Verlag von A. Charisius. Lüderiss'sche Buchhandlung, 1862.
- Psalm 57, Gott sei mir gnädig (8 solo voices + chorus a capella) (D-MEIr F 614 XI/5-262 NHs 741. Composed around 1861?)

== Arrangements ==
- Simon, Ernst, Op. 49. Alpenveilchen. Salonstück f. Pfte, f. V. u. Pfte bearb. v. Jean Josef Bott. Magdeburg, Haushahn 1880.
- Simon, Ernst, Op. 62. Alpenröslein. Salonstück f. V. m. Pfte arr. v. Jean Josef Bott. Magdeburg, Heinrichshofen Vlg. 1880.
- Simon, Ernst Op. 63. Ich liebe Dich. Salonstück f. V. m. Pfte arr. v. Jean Josef Bott. Magdeburg, Heinrichshofen Vlg. 1880.
