= Louisa Melvin Delos Mars =

American classical composer (c. 1860 – after 1926)

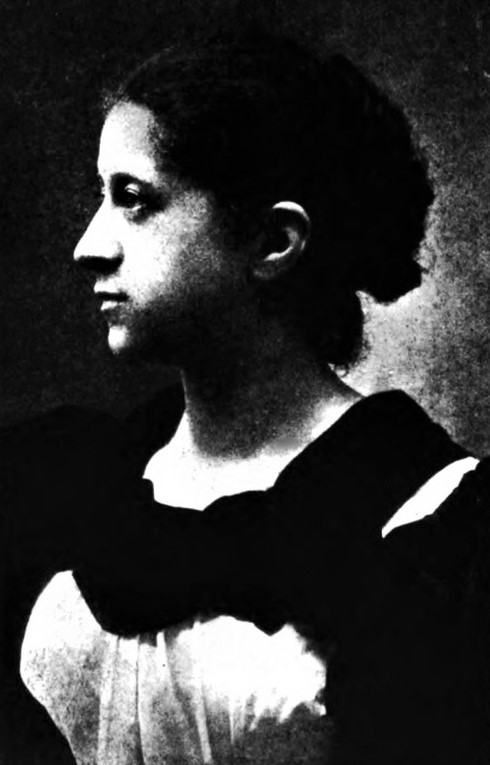
Louisa Melvin Delos Mars

Louisa Melvin Delos Mars (c.1860 – after 1926) was a late 19th-century African-American singer and composer who was active in Providence, Rhode Island, and Boston, Massachusetts. She was one of the first black women to achieve recognition as a composer, and was one of the first black students to graduate from the New England Conservatory. She is best known for composing five full length operettas.

== Life and career ==
Born Louisa Melvin in Providence and later a resident of Boston, Melvin Delos Mars was one of the earliest African-American women to achieve recognition as a composer. She was one of the first black individuals to graduate from the New England Conservatory and first achieved notice in the 1880s singing alongside her sister, Carrie Melvin Lucas, who played cornet and violin. Her sister was the wife of vaudeville entertainer Sam Lucas, and their daughter and Louisa's niece, Maria Lucas, also became a popular trombonist, pianist, and conductor who eventually became the music director at the Howard Theatre in Washington, D.C.

Melvin Delos Mars was the first African-American woman to have an opera she composed produced: Leoni, the Gypsy Queen in Providence, Rhode Island in 1889. She went on to compose and star in four more full length operettas which were staged in either Boston, Massachusetts or Providence, Rhode Island between 1880–1896, including Fun At A Boarding School, and Love In Disguise; or, Things Are Not What They Seem. None of her works survive.

== Personal life ==
Melvin Delos Mars was married to William Delos Mars (1856–1927), and the couple had two sons who were born in Providence: Charles (born May 19, 1883) and Christian (born December 23, 1886). Not much is known about her activities or whereabouts after 1896.
