= William Dillon =

American songwriter

William A. Dillon
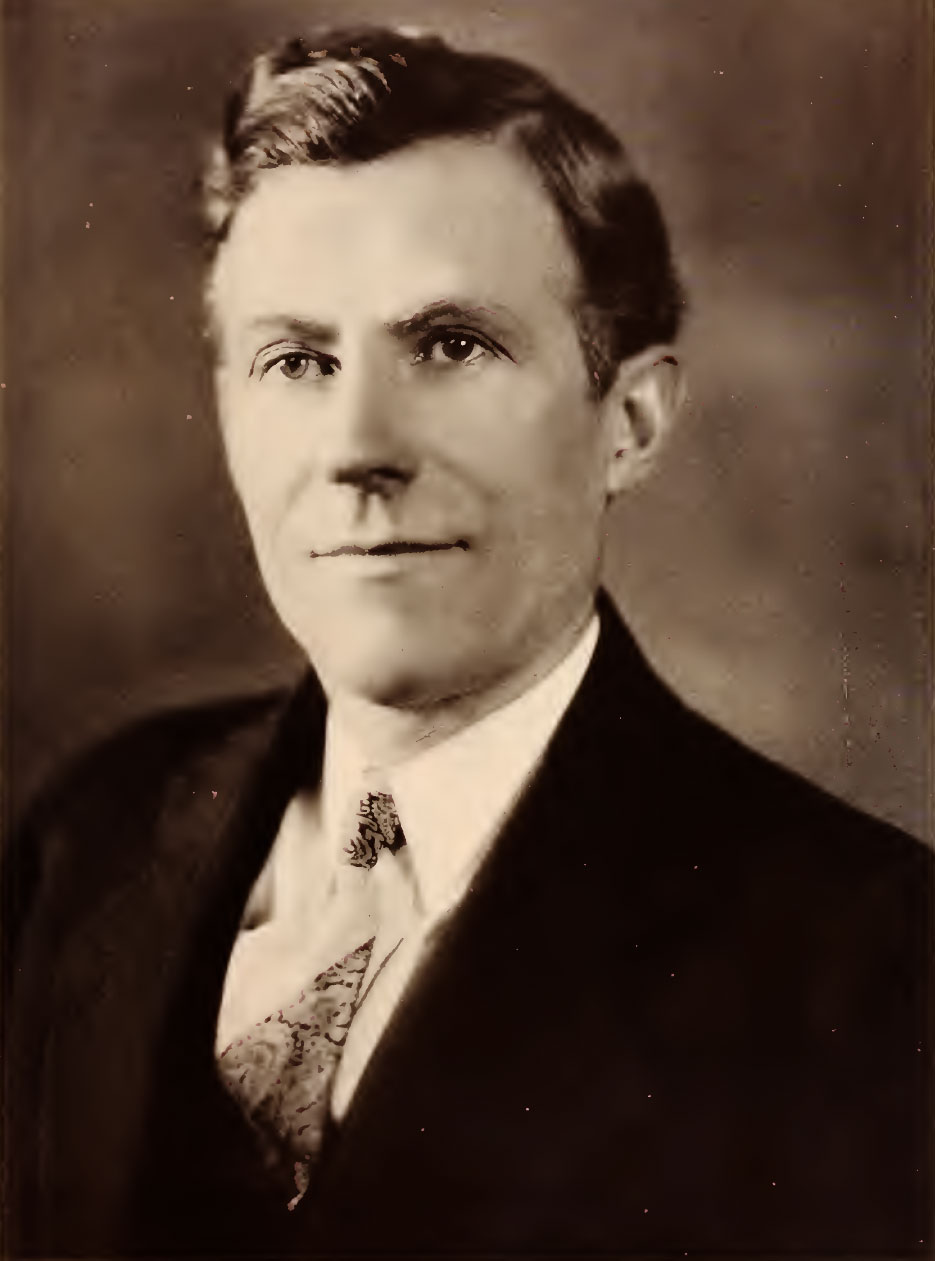
- 1927 publicity photo

Background information
- Birth name: William Austin Dillon
- Born: November 6, 1877; Cortland, New York, U.S
- Died: February 10, 1966 (aged 88); Burbank, California, U.S.
- Occupations: songwriter; theatre operator

William Austin Dillon (November 6, 1877 – February 10, 1966) was an American songwriter and Vaudevillian. He is best known as the lyricist for the song "I Want A Girl (Just Like The Girl That Married Dear Old Dad)" (1911), written in collaboration with Harry Von Tilzer., which can be heard in Show Business (1944) and The Jolson Story (1946).

Dillon was born in Cortland, New York and performed in vaudeville with his brothers John and Harry, as well as with own act, billed as the "man of a thousand songs".

Dillon married in 1918 to Georgia Leola Head, daughter of George and Mary (Steen) Head.

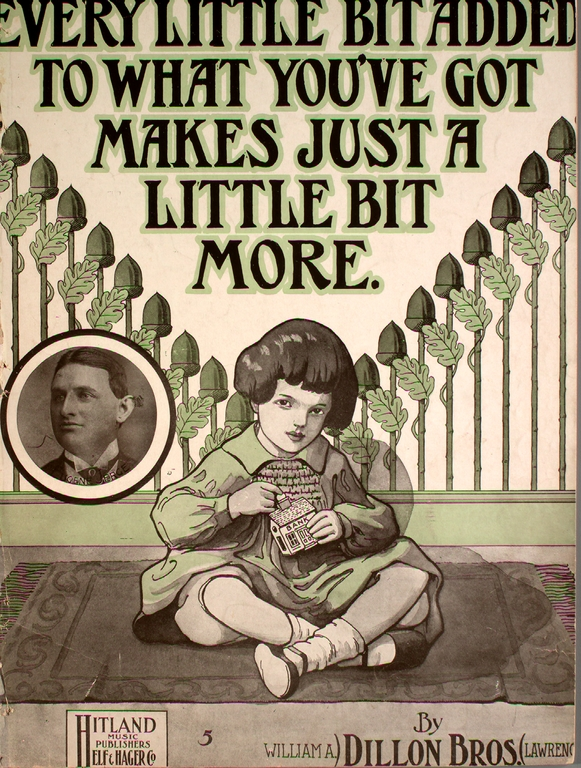
Sheet music cover to 1907's Every Little Bit Added To What You've Got Makes Just a Little Bit More by William and brother Lawrence

He quit the vaudeville stage around 1912 after injuries suffered in a car accident, but remained active in the entertainment world as a songwriter andtheater operator. Dillon eventually returned to performing for troops in World War II and made television appearances.

He died in Ithaca, New York on February 10, 1966.

== Selected songs ==
- "Every Little Bit Added to What You've Got Makes Just a Little Bit More" (1907, written with his brother Lawrence)
- "I'd Rather Have a Girlie Than an Automobile" (1908)
- "Keep Your Foot on the Soft Pedal" (1909)
- "I Want A Girl (Just Like The Girl That Married Dear Old Dad)" (1911, with von Tilzer)
- "All Alone" (1911, with Tilzer)
- "That Girl of Mine" (1916, with Harry Tobias and Arthur Lange)
- "I'll Wed the Girl I Left Behind" (1916)
- "On the Old Back Seat of the Henry Ford" (1916, with Lawrence)
- "My Grandfather's Girl" (1916)
- "Take Me to My Alabam" (1916)
- "Keep Right on to the End of the Road" (1924, with Harry Lauder)
- "Me and My Uncle Sam" (1941)
