= Ernest Hogan =

Vaudeville performer (1865–1909)

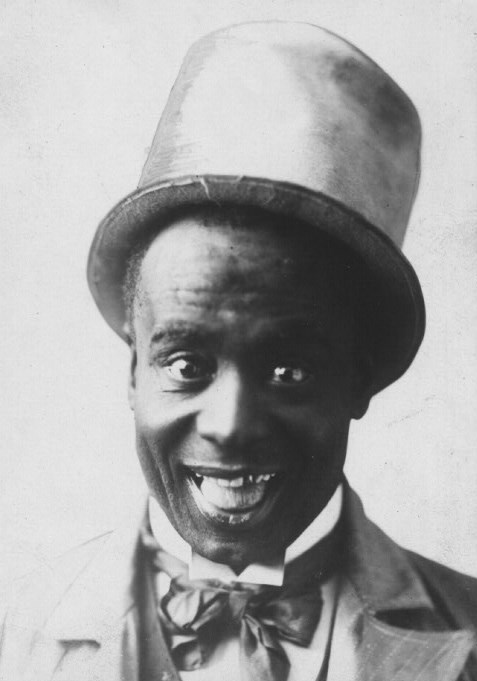
- Born: Ernest Reuben Crowdus; 1865; Bowling Green, Kentucky, U.S.
- Died: May 20, 1909 (aged 43–44); Lakewood, New Jersey, U.S.
- Occupations: Entertainer, comedian, musician, composer, dancer, producer
- Known for: First Black American entertainer to produce and star in a Broadway show (The Oyster Man); popularizing ragtime
- Spouses: Mattie Wilkes (m. c. 1901/1902); Louise

Ernest Hogan (born Ernest Reuben Crowdus; 1865 – May 20, 1909) was the first Black American entertainer to produce and star in a Broadway show, The Oyster Man in 1907, (shows at the African Grove Theatre preceded it by generations) and helped to popularize the musical genre of ragtime.

A native of Bowling Green, Kentucky, Hogan worked in traveling minstrel shows as a dancer, musician, and comedian as a teenager. In 1895-1896 Hogan composed several popular songs, including "La Pas Ma La" and "All Coons Look Alike to Me." The success of the latter song created many derogatory imitations, known as "coon songs," because of their use of racist and stereotypical images of black people. Hogan also wrote "The Phrenologist Coon" in 1901.

Hogan was considered one of the most talented performers and comedians of his day.

== Early years ==
Hogan was born Ernest Reuben Crowders in the Shake Rag District of Bowling Green, Kentucky, in 1865. Little to nothing is known about his childhood. However, as a teenager, he traveled with a minstrel troupe called the Georgia Graduate, performing as a dancer, musician, and comedian. He changed his name to Hogan because "Irish performers were in vogue." He would also claim that he took the name to honor Judge Hogan of Bowling Green, for whom his mother had worked as a cook. A few years after changing his name to Hogan, Ernest started finding success in solo acts in New York City. He likely performed in blackface as he sometimes did later in his career.

== Family life ==
Ernest Hogan was believed to have been married twice. He was first wed to a youthful singer named Mattie Wilkes. She was a popular soprano performing in vaudeville shows with him; they married around 1901 or 1902. Hogan was later reportedly married to a woman named Louise, who helped him organize concerts in the early 1900s. The specific dates of these marriages are unknown; Hogan did not have children with either of his wives.

== His earliest ragtime composition ==
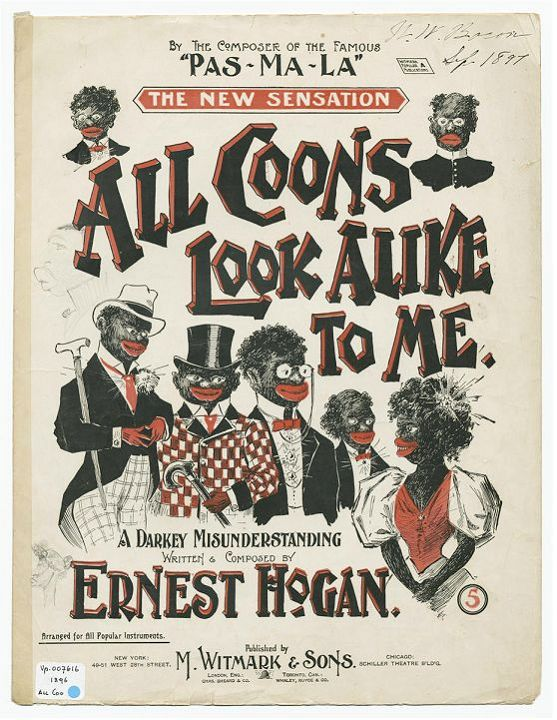
Sheet music to "All Coons Look Alike to Me."

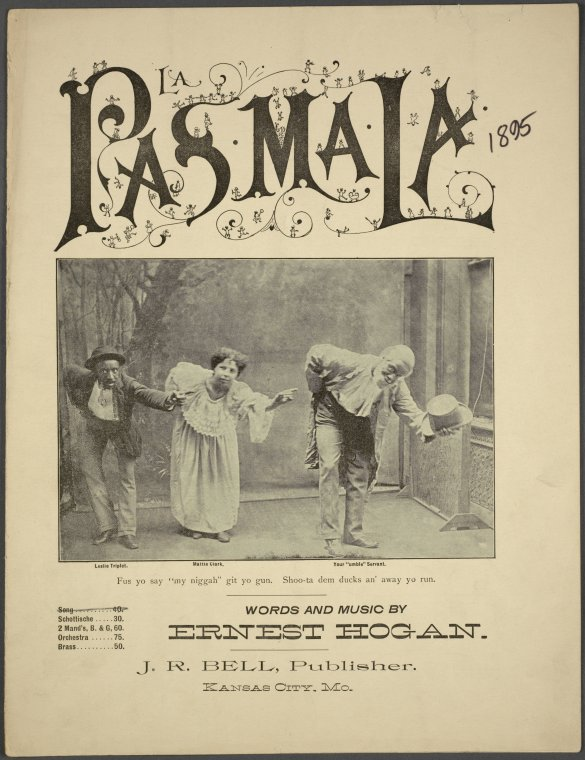
Cover for "La Pas Ma La" sheet music (1895). Words and Music by Ernest Hogan

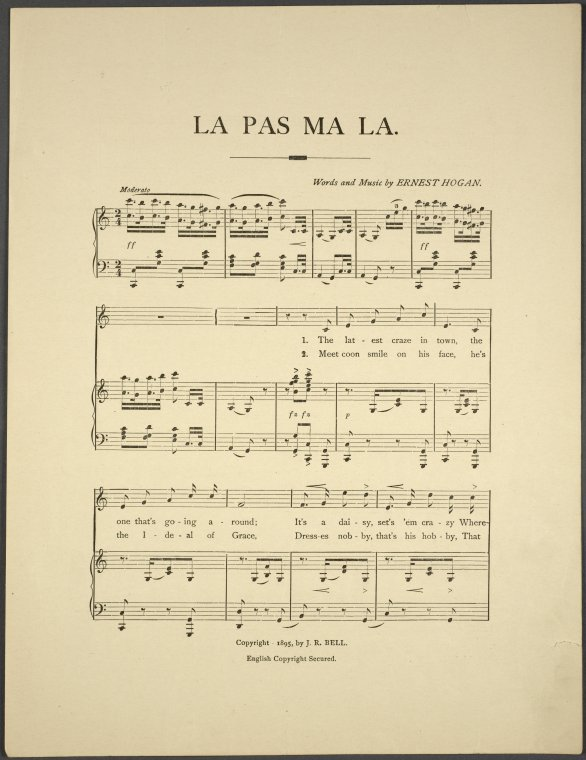
"Las Pas Ma La" sheet music

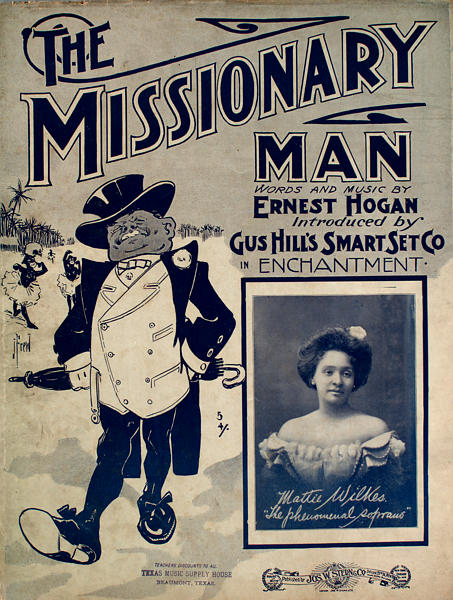
Cover for The Missionary Man sheet music (1902). Words and Music by Ernest Hogan, introduced by Gus Hill's Smart Set Co. in Enchantment (Mattie Wilkes, "The phenomenal soprano")

During this time, Hogan created a comedy dance called the "La Pas Ma La," which consisted of a walk forward with three steps back. In 1895, he wrote and composed a song based on this dance called "pasmala." The song's chorus was:

Hand upon yo' head, let your mind rollback,
Back, back back and look at the stars
Stand up rightly, dance it brightly
That's the Pas Ma La.

Hogan followed this song with the hit "All Coons Look Alike to Me." which was one of the very first ragtime songs by a Black musician. Hogan was not the originator of the song's lyrics, having appropriated them after hearing a pianist in a Chicago salon playing a song titled "All Pimps Look Alike to Me." Hogan merely changed the words slightly, substituting the word "coon" for "pimp" and added a ragtime syncopation to the music thanks to the contribution of the composer Max Hoffman. The song eventually sold over a million copies.

The success of this song created many imitations, which became known as "coon songs" because of their use of highly racist and stereotypical images of blacks. They exploded in Popularity after 1900.

The controversy over the song has, to some degree, caused Hogan to be mistaken as one of the originators of ragtime, which has been called the first truly American musical genre. Hogan's songs were among the first published ragtime songs and the first to use the term "rag" in their sheet music copy. While Hogan made no claims to having exclusively created ragtime, fellow black musician Tom Fletcher said Hogan was the "first to put on paper the kind of rhythm that non-reading musicians were playing." When the ragtime championship was held as part of the 1900 World Competition in New York, semifinalists played Hogan's "All Coons Look Alike to Me" to prove their skill.

As Hogan said shortly before he died,

(That) song caused a lot of trouble in and out of show business, but it was also good for show business because, at the time, money was short in all walks of life. With the publication of that song, a new musical rhythm was given to the people. Its popularity grew and it sold like wildfire... That one song opened the way for many colored and white songwriters. Finding the rhythm so great, they stuck to it ... and now you get hit songs without the word 'coon.' Ragtime was the rhythm played in backrooms and cafes and such places. The ragtime players were the boys who played just by ear their creations of music which would have been lost to the world if I had not put it on paper."

== Death ==
In January 1908, Hogan collapsed onstage in New York and again in Boston while performing in The Oyster Man. Forced to leave the show, Hogan spent the remainder of his life trying but failing to recuperate. He died of tuberculosis in Lakewood, New Jersey, on May 20, 1909.

== See also ==
- African-American music
- African-American musical theater
- Coon song
- Irving Jones
- Ragtime
