= La Pas Ma La =

1895 composition

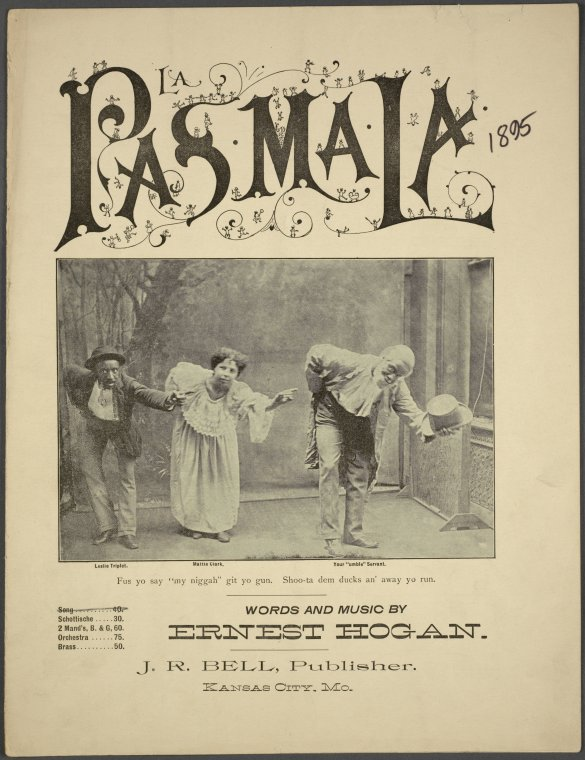

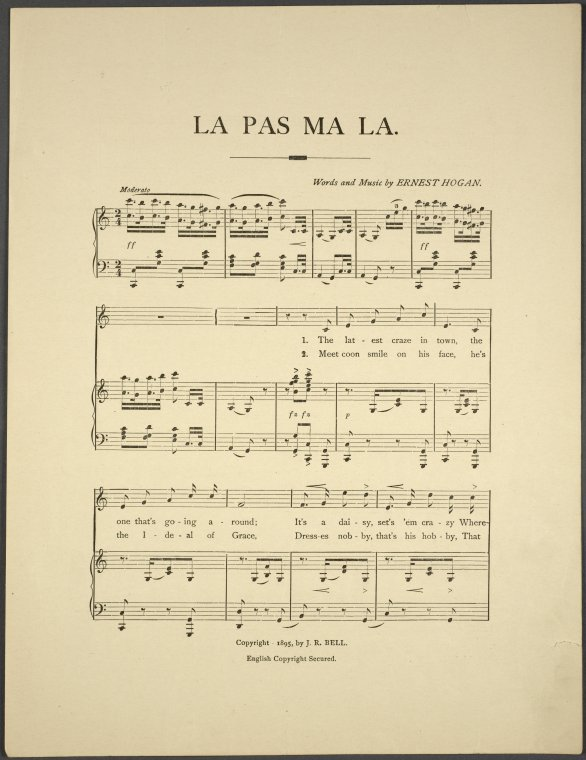

"La Pas Ma La" is a composition published by minstrel performer Ernest Hogan in 1895 and was falsely claimed to be the first published ragtime work. With his troupe, the Georgia Graduates, Hogan created a comedy dance called the "Pasmala" consisting of a walk forward with three steps back, and in 1895 composed and published a song based on this dance. The song's chorus was:

Hand upon yo' head, let your mind roll back,
Back, back back and look at the stars
Stand up rightly, dance it brightly
That's the Pas Ma La.

Despite originally being recognized as the first published ragtime work, the copyright for You've Been a Good Old Wagon but You Done Broke Down – another contender for the title – was registered in January of 1895 (Greenup Music Co.)source, a few months prior to La Pas Ma La (September of 1895, J. R. Bell)source, ultimately proving You've Been a Good Old Wagon in fact was the first of the two.
