= Charles P. Lowe =

American xylophonist and music recording pioneer

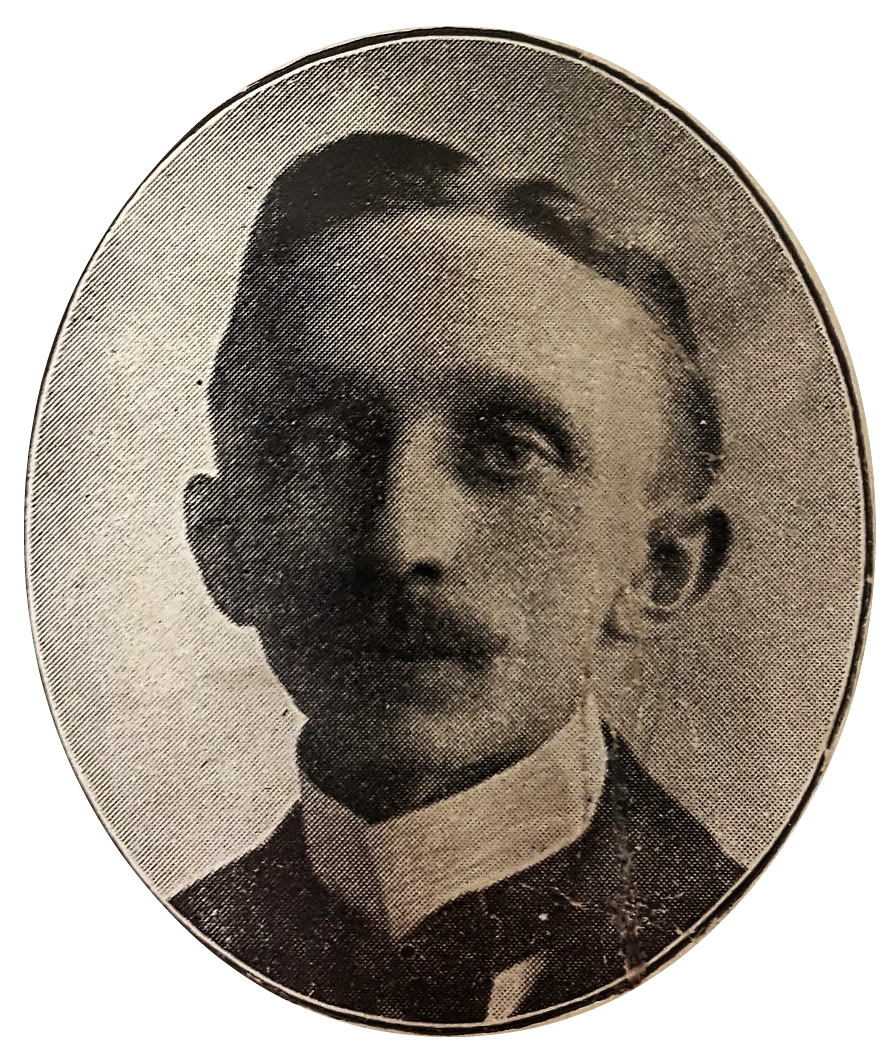
Portrait of Lowe c. 1900

Charles P. Lowe was an American xylophonist who made numerous recordings in the early days of the recording industry.

In 1883 Lowe was featured in a series of concerts at West End, New Orleans directed by Gustav D'Aquin. Lowe was a featured performer in New York theaters in the 1880s, including Huber's Prospect Garden (1884).

Lowe first recorded for the New Jersey Phonograph Company in 1892 and remained the most prominent xylophonist in the recording industry's formative years. He recorded for most American record companies in existence before 1905, including 21 titles for Berliner Gramophone between 1897 and 1899, Columbia cylinders (pre-1900 to 1905) and discs (1902 to 1905), Edison cylinders, Victor Records from 1900 to 1904, and numerous recordings for Zonophone between 1900 and 1903. His last recordings were made in 1905.

Lowe played xylophones with rounded bars in order to ease the execution of glissandi. His rolls were played in a faster style than was to be common later.

He was married to contralto Jacobine Wichmann Lowe, who performed as "Miss Jottie".
