= List of operas by Johann Adam Hiller =

This is a list of operas by Johann Adam Hiller (1728–1804).

== List ==
Title	Genre	Subdivisions	Libretto	Date	Place, theatre
Die verwandelten Weiber, oder Der Teufel ist los, erster Theil	comische Oper	3 acts	Christian Felix Weiße, after Charles Coffey's The Devil to Pay, or The Wives Metamorphos'd, and Michel-Jean Sedaine's libretto for Philidor	28 May 1766	Leipzig, Quandt's Court
Der lustige Schuster, oder Der Teufel ist los, zweyter Theil	comische Oper	3 acts	Christian Felix Weiße, after Charles Coffey's The Merry Cobler	1766	Leipzig, Rannstädter Thore
Lisuart und Dariolette, oder Die Frage und die Antwort	romantisch-comische Oper	2 acts	Daniel Schiebeler, after Charles Simon Favart	25 November 1766	Leipzig, Rannstädter Thore
Lottchen am Hofe	comische Oper	3 acts	Christian Felix Weiße, after Charles Simon Favart's Le caprice amoureux, ou Ninette à la cour	24 April 1767	Leipzig, Rannstädter Thore
Die Muse	Nachspiel	1 act	Daniel Schiebeler	3 October 1767	Leipzig, Rannstädter Thore
Die Liebe auf dem Lande	comische Oper	3 acts	Christian Felix Weiße, after Charles Simon Favart's Annette et Lubin (Acts 1 and 3) and L Anseaume's La clochette (Act 2)	18 May 1768	Leipzig, Rannstädter Thore
Die Jagd	comische Oper	3 acts	Christian Felix Weiße, after Charles Collé's La partie de chasse de Henri IV and Michel-Jean Sedaine's Le roi et le fermier	29 January 1770	Weimar, Kleines Schloss
Der Dorfbalbier	comische Operette	1 act	Christian Felix Weiße, after Michel-Jean Sedaine's Blaise le savetier	18 April 1771	Leipzig, Rannstädter Thore
Der Aerndtekranz	comische Oper	3 acts	Christian Felix Weiße	April or May 1771	Leipzig, Rannstädter Thore
Der Krieg	comische Oper	3 acts	Christian Felix Weiße and Carl Wilhelm Ramler, after Carlo Goldoni's La guerra	17 August 1772	Berlin, Behrenstrasse
Der Jubelhochzeit	comische Oper	3 acts	Christian Felix Weiße	5 April 1773	Berlin, Behrenstrasse
Poltis, oder Das gerettete Troja	Operette	3 acts	Gottfried Samuel Brunner and Magister Steinel	1777	Leipzig, Rannstädter Thore
Die kleine Ährenleserinn	Operette für Kinder	1 act	Christian Felix Weiße	unperformed	
Das Grab des Mufti, oder Die zwey Geizigen	comische Oper	2 acts	August Gottlieb Meissner, after Charles-Georges Fenouillot de Falbaire's Les deux avares	17 January 1779	Leipzig, Rannstädter Thore
Das Denkmal in Arkadien	ländiches Schauspiel für die Jugend mit untermischten Gesängen	1 act	Christian Felix Weiße, after George Keate's The Monument in Arcadia	lost	
