= 1904 in music =

This is a list of notable events in music that took place in the year 1904.

== Specific locations ==
- 1904 in Norwegian music

== Events ==
- January 9 – Estampes by Claude Debussy, receives its initial performance at the Societe Nationale de Musique in Paris.
- January 13 – Béla Bartók's symphonic poem Kossuth is premiered in Budapest, becoming his first major work to be performed.
- January 21 – The Deutsches Nationaltheater in Brno premiers Leoš Janáček's opera Její pastorkyňa (later known as Jenůfa), with Czech libretto by the composer.
- January 28 – The Russian Symphony Orchestra formed by conductor Modest Altschuler gives its first concert at Cooper Union in New York City. (The orchestra is an American one with a Russian name, not a Russian orchestra touring the United States.)
- February 1 – Enrico Caruso records the aria "Vesti la giubba" from Ruggero Leoncavallo's Pagliaci for the Victor Company, his first recording in the United States.
- February 4 – Jules Massenet's ballet La Cigale is performed for the first time at the Opera-Comique in Paris.
- February 8 – Jean Sibelius conducts the premiere of his Violin Concerto in D minor, Op.47 in Helsinki, Finland; Viktor Nováček is soloist.
- February 17 – Puccini's opera Madama Butterfly debuts at La Scala in Milan to no great acclaim.
- February 18 – Camille Saint-Saëns's opera Helene premieres at Monte Carlo.
- February 28 – Vincent d'Indy's Symphony No.2 in B-flat Major, Op.57 is performed for the first time by the Lamoureux Orchestra in Paris.
- February 29 – Béla Bartók's Scherzo Burlesque for Piano and Orchestra, Op.2, premieres in Budapest.
- March 2 – Emma Calve sings Carmen at the New York Metropolitan Opera. This is her farewell performance with this opera company.
- March 5 – Maurice Ravel's String Quartet in F major receives its first performance in Paris, given by the Societe Nationale de Musique; it is the only quartet by the composer.
- March 16 – The Hallé Orchestra of Manchester gives the first performance of the concert overture In the South, by Edward Elgar, conducted by the composer.
- March 18 – Anatoly Liadov's symphonic poem Baba-Yaga premieres in Saint Petersburg.
- March 21 – Tone poem Symphonia domestica by Richard Strauss receives its premiere at Carnegie Hall, New York City, conducted by the composer on his first visit to the United States.
- March 25 – Antonín Dvořák's last opera, Armida, is produced in its original Czech version in Prague.
- March 30 – The first opera of English composer Frederick Delius, Koanga, premieres at the Stadttheater in Elberfeld, Germany.
- April 25 – Jean Sibelius' Valse triste premieres in Helsinki, Finland, the composer conducting.
- May 10 – Hugo Alfven's rhapsody for orchestra Midsommervaka is premiered in Stockholm, Sweden.
- May 16 – The Diamond Jubilee of violinist Joseph Joachim's first appearance in the UK is celebrated at Queen's Hall, London.
- May 17
  - Maurice Ravel's Sheherezade and Albert Roussel's Resurrection are premiered on the same program at a concert of the Societe Nationale de Musique in Paris.
  - Vincent d'Indy's Choral varie Op.55, a composition featuring the saxophone as solo instrument, premieres in Paris
- May 28 – A revised three-act version of Giacomo Puccini's Madama Butterfly is performed in Brescia with enormous praise.
- June 9 – The Queen's Hall Orchestra, under Sir Henry Wood, plays its first concert under its new name of the London Symphony Orchestra.
- June 15 – The first transmission of wireless telegraphy featuring music and dialogue takes place in Salzburg with Otto Nußbaumer making the transmission.
- June 27 – Raoul Laparra is awarded the first Grand Prix de Rome by the Academie des Beaux-Arts in Paris with his cantata Alyssa. Maurice Ravel was a contestant.
- July 5 – Composer Edward Elgar is knighted in Great Britain by King Edward VII.
- July 15 – Soprano Agnes Nicholls marries conductor Hamilton Harty.
- July – The Act of Touch in All Its Diversity by pianist Tobias Matthay is published in London by Longmans, Green and Co.
- September 7 – Sir Hubert Parry's choral work The Love that Casteth Out Fear premieres at the Gloucester Music Festival. This work, about the passion of Christ, has a text by the composer.
- September 12 – Pianist Ignacy Jan Paderewski gives a concert in Wellington, New Zealand.
- October
  - Alban Berg begins his studies under Arnold Schoenberg.
  - The Gramophone Company records the Bach-Gounod Ave Maria (G.C. 03033) performed by Dame Nellie Melba with Jan Kubelík on violin.
- October 16 – Pan Voyevoda, a four-act opera by Nikolai Rimsky-Korsakov, receives its first performance in Saint Petersburg.
- October 18 – Gustav Mahler's Symphony No. 5 is premiered by the Gürzenich Orchestra Cologne under the composer's baton; it is also first published this year.
- November 4 – Franco Alfano's four-act opera Risurrezione based on Tolstoy's novel receives its first performance in Turin
- November 5 – Emil Oberhoffer conducts the first concert of the newly established Minneapolis Symphony Orchestra.
- November 10
  - Ferruccio Busoni gives the world premiere of his Piano Concerto at the Beethoven-Saal in Berlin.
  - Arthur Nikisch and the Berlin Philharmonic record Ludwig van Beethoven's Symphony No.5 in C minor for the Gramophone Company, the first recording of a complete symphony.
- November 13 – Caprice andalou by Camille Saint-Saëns, scored for violin and orchestra, receives its initial performance in Paris
- November 16 – Samuel Coleridge-Taylor, in his first trip to the United States, conducts the first American performance of his The Song of Hiawatha.
- November 20 – The Hague Philharmonic Orchestra gives its inaugural concert, conducted by Henri Viotta.
- November 22 – Pope Pius X issues his Motu proprio Tra le sollecitudini a papal document in which he puts forth rules for performance and interpretation of Gregorian chant.
- November 29 – Ernst von Dohnanyi's 4 Rhapsodies for Piano, Op.11, are premiered in Vienna, the composer performing.
- December 10 – Serge Rachmaninoff, Sergei Taneyev and Alexander Scriabin are among the winners of the first annual Glinka Award for best composition by Russian composers.
- December 13 – Ruggero Leoncavallo's opera Der Roland von Berlin premieres at Berlin. The opera is a failure.
- December 24
  - Theodore Thomas conducts his final concert with the Chicago Orchestra.
  - The Metropolitan Opera in New York City gives the first performance outside Bayreuth of Richard Wagner's Parsifal, despite copyright objections raised by Cosima and Siegried Wagner.
- December 26 – Dancer Isadora Duncan makes her Russian debut in Saint Petersburg to music by Frédéric Chopin.
- December 29 – The Seattle Symphony Orchestra gives its first concert, conducted by Harry West at Christensen's Hall.
- Heckelphone introduced from Wilhelm Heckel's workshop.
- Claudio Monteverdi's opera L'Orfeo is given a modern debut in concert version in Paris.

== Published popular music ==
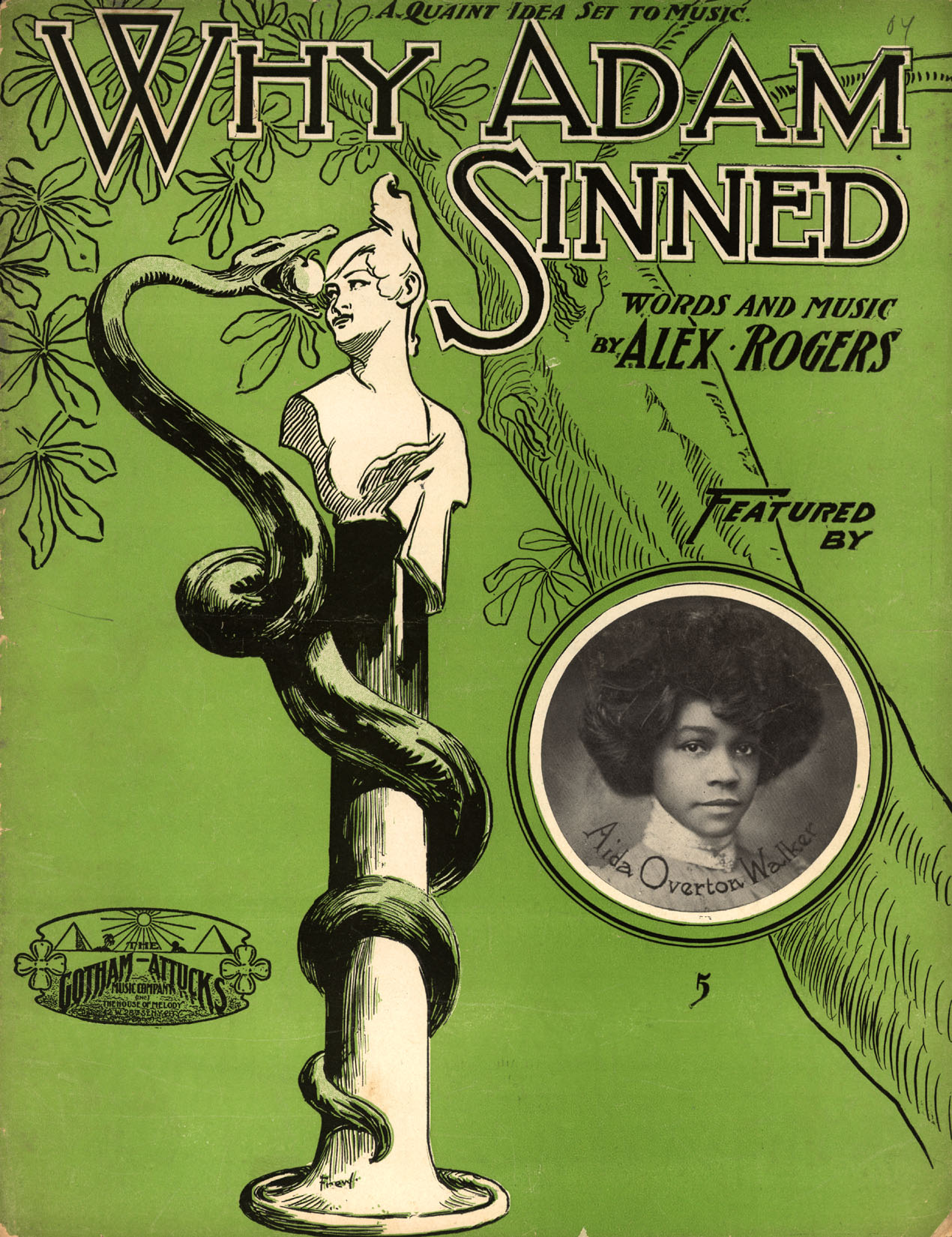

- "Abraham" w. Sterling m. Von Tilzer
- "Absinthe Frappe" w. Glen MacDonough m. Victor Herbert
- "Ain't It Funny What a Difference Just a Few Hours Make" w. Henry Blossom m. Alfred G. Robyn. Introduced by Raymond Hitchcock in the Broadway show The Yankee Consul
- "Al Fresco" w. Glen MacDonough m. Victor Herbert
- "Alexander" w. Andrew B. Sterling m. Harry Von Tilzer
- "All Aboard For Dreamland" w. Andrew B. Sterling m. Harry Von Tilzer
- "Back, Back To Baltimore" w. Harry H. Williams m. Egbert Van Alstyne
- "Berliner Luft" w. Heinrich Bolten-Baeckers m. Paul Lincke
- "Big Indian Chief" w. Bob Cole m. J. Rosamond Johnson
- "Billy" w. Edgar Malone m. Ted S. Barron
- "Blue Bell" w. Edward Madden, Dolly Morse m. Theodore F. Morse
- "By The Old Oak Tree" w. George V. Hobart m. Max Hoffmann
- "Come Back To Sorrento" (Original title "Torna A Surriento") w.m. Ernesto de Curtis & Claude Aveling
- "Come Down From The Big Fig Tree" w. Edward Madden m. Theodore Morse
- "Come Take A Trip In My Airship" w. Ren Shields m. George Evans
- "Cordalia Malone" Jerome, Schwartz
- "The Countess Of Alagazam" w.m. Bob Cole
- "The Day That You Grew Colder" w.m. Paul Dresser
- "Don't Cry, Katie, Dear" Mills
- "Down In The Subway" Jerome, Schwartz
- "Down On The Brandywine" w. Vincent P. Bryan m. J. B. Mullen
- "Fascination" w. Dick Manning m. F. D. Marchetti Words 1932.
- "Fishing" w. James Weldon Johnson m. J. Rosamond Johnson
- "Following In Father's Footsteps" w.m. E. W. Rogers
- "Fu' The Noo" w. Harry Lauder & Gerald Grafton m. Harry Lauder
- "The Ghost That Never Walked" w. William Jerome m. Jean Schwartz
- "Gimme De Leavins" w. James Weldon Johnson m. Bob Cole
- "Give My Regards to Broadway" w.m. George M. Cohan
- "Good-bye Flo" w.m. George M. Cohan
- "Goodbye, Little Girl, Goodbye" w. Will D. Cobb m.. Gus Edwards
- "Goodbye, My Lady Love" w.m. Joseph E. Howard
- "The Goo-Goo Man" Stoddard, Schindler, Jerome
- "Hannah, Won't You Open That Door" w. Andrew B. Sterling m. Harry von Tilzer
- "Have You Seen Maggie Riley?" Von Tilzer
- "He Done Me Wrong" w.m. Hughie Cannon
- "Heinie" Rose, Snyder
- "I Love You All The Time" w.m. Will R. Anderson
- "I Want To Be A Soldier" w.m. William Cahill
- "I'm Longing For My Old Kentucky Home" w. Vincent Bryan m. J. B. Mullen
- "In The Days Of Old" w. Henry Blossom m. Alfred G. Robyn
- "In Zanzibar – My Little Chimpanzee" w. Will D. Cobb m. Gus Edwards
- "Just An Ever-Loving Girl" w. Vincent Bryan m. J. B. Mullen
- "Just For The Sake Of Society" w. Alfred Bryan m. Kerry Mills
- "Kiss Me Good Night, Dear Love" w.m. Malcolm Williams & Israel Zangwill
- "Let's All Go Up To Maud's" w. Joseph C. Farrell m. Kerry Mills
- "Life's a Funny Proposition After All" w.m. George M Cohan
- "A Little Boy Called "Taps"" w. Edward Madden m. Theodore F. Morse
- "The Man Behind" w. Vincent Bryan m. J. B. Mullen
- "The Man With The Ladder And Hose" w.m. T. Mayo Geary
- "La Mattinata" m. Ruggiero Leoncavallo
- "Maureen Of Ballinasloe" w. J. Francis Barron m. J. Airlie Dix
- "Meet Me in St. Louis, Louis" w. Andrew B. Sterling m. Kerry Mills
- "Mexico" w. James Weldon Johnson & Bob Cole m. Bob Cole
- "Mister Wilson, That's All" w. Henry Williams m. Egbert Van Alstyne
- "My Honey Lou" w.m. Thurland Chattaway
- "My Kangaroo" Farrell & Kohlman
- "Nan! Nan! Nan!" by Edward Madden
- "Oh Bliss! Oh Joy!" Mullen
- "Oh Gee! It's Great To Be Crazy" Carle, Bowers
- "Oh! Oh! Sallie" Hartlett
- "On The Warpath" Raymond A. Browne (composer)
- "One Fine Day" (Original title "Un Bel Di") w. L. Illica & G. Giacosa m. G. Puccini
- "Please Come And Play In My Yard" w. Edward Madden m. Theodore F. Morse
- "Preacher and the Bear" w.m. George Fairman
- "Saint Louis Rag" m. Tom Turpin
- "Scissors To Grind" w.m. Thomas S. Allen
- "Seminole" w. Harry Williams m. Egbert Van Alstyne
- "Shame On You" Larkin, Smith
- "She Went to the City" by Paul Dresser
- "Since Little Dolly Dimples Made A Hit" w. William Jerome m. Jean Schwartz
- "St. Louis Tickle" m. Barney & Seymore
- "The Story Of A Clothes Line" m. James W. Tate w. Frank Clifford Harris
- "Sweet Thoughts Of Home" w. Stanislaus Stange m. Julian Edwards
- "Teasing" w. Cecil Mack m. Albert Von Tilzer
- "Those Songs My Mother Used To Sing" w.m. H. Wakefield Smith
- "Three Green Bonnets" w. Harris m. Guy d'Hardelot
- "Tippecanoe" w. Harry Williams m. Egbert Van Alstyne
- "The Trumpeter" by Francis Barron
- "What The Brass Band Played" Drislane, Morse
- "Why Adam Sinned" w.m. Alex Rogers
- "Won't You Fondle Me" w.m. James Kendis & Herman Paley
- "The Yankee Doodle Boy" w.m. George M. Cohan
- "Your Mother Wants You Home Boy" w.m. Paul Dresser

== Classical music ==
- Béla Bartók
  - Piano Quintet
  - Rhapsody, Op. 1
- Hakon Børresen – Concerto for Violin and Orchestra in G major
- František Alois Drdla – Souvenir in D major
- Edward Elgar
  - In the South
  - Pomp and Circumstance March No. 3 in C minor
- Alexander Glazunov – Violin Concerto in A minor
- Enrique Granados – Allegro de concierto
- Hamilton Harty – An Irish Symphony
- Gustav Mahler – Kindertotenlieder (Songs of the Death of Children) (song-cycle)
- Erkki Melartin – Sleeping Beauty, Op.22
- Selim Palmgren – Piano Concerto No.1 in G minor
- Max Reger – Variations and Fugue on a Theme by Hiller
- Alexander Scriabin – Symphony No. 3
- Cyril Scott
  - Scherzo, Op.25
  - 2 Pierrot Pieces, Op.35
  - 2 Piano Pieces, Op.37
- Petar Stojanović – Violin Concerto No. 1
- Igor Stravinsky – Piano Sonata in F-sharp minor

== Opera ==
- Franco Alfano – Risurrezione
- Frederick Delius – Koanga
- Antonín Dvořák – Armida
- Leoš Janáček – Jenůfa (Její pastorkyňa)
- Ruggero Leoncavallo – Der Roland von Berlin
- Giacomo Puccini – Madama Butterfly
- Sergei Rachmaninoff – The Miserly Knight
- Nikolai Rimski-Korsakov – Pan Voyevoda
- Camille Saint-Saëns – Helene
- Amedeo Vives – Bohemios

== Operetta ==
- A rátartós királykisasszony (The Haughty Princess) by Victor Jacobi. First performed on December 17 at Budapest.

== Ballet ==
- La Cigale by Jules Massenet's is performed for the first time at the Opera-Comique in Paris (Feb.4)

== Musical theater ==
- The Catch of the Season London production opened at the Vaudeville Theatre on September 9 and ran for 621 performances
- The Cingalee (Lionel Monckton, Adrian Ross and Percy Greenbank) – London production opened at Daly's Theatre on March 5 and ran for 365 performances
- It Happened in Nordland Broadway production opened at the Lew M. Fields Theatre on December 5 and ran for 254 performances
- Little Johnny Jones (book, music, lyrics, direction and featuring George M. Cohan) Broadway production opened at the Liberty Theatre on November 7 and ran for 52 performances
- Paris by Night (Music: Alfred Solmon Book: Harry Marshall) Broadway production opened at the Madison Square Roof Garden on July 2 and ran for 50 performances. Starring Ben Welch.
- The Rogers Brothers In Paris Broadway production opened at the New Amsterdam Theatre on September 5 and ran for 72 performances
- Sergeant Brue London production opened at the Strand Theatre on June 14
- The Yankee Consul Broadway production opened at the Broadway Theatre on February 22 and ran for 115 performances

== Births ==
- January 10 – Ray Bolger, singer and dancer (d. 1987)
- January 13 – Richard Addinsell, composer (d. 1977)
- January 15
  - Eddie DeLange, bandleader and lyricist (d. 1949)
  - Leonid Jacobson, Russian dancer, choreographer and ballet master (d. 1975)
- January 18 – Anthony Galla-Rini, accordionist, composer and conductor (d. 2006)
- January 22 – George Balanchine, Russian choreographer (d. 1983)
- February 3 – Luigi Dallapiccola, composer (d. 1975)
- February 23 – Allan Gray, film composer (d. 1973)
- February 29 – Jimmy Dorsey, bandleader (d. 1957)
- March 1 – Glenn Miller, trombonist and bandleader (m. 1944)
- March 4 – Joseph Schmidt, Austrian-Hungarian tenor and actor (d. 1942)
- March 8 – Nikos Skalkottas Greek composer (d.1949)
- April 9 – Sharkey Bonano, jazz musician (d. 1972)
- April 16 – Fifi D'Orsay, actress and singer (d. 1983)
- April 18 – Pigmeat Markham, all-round entertainer (d. 1981)
- April 29
  - Russ Morgan, orchestra leader (d. 1969)
  - Pedro Vargas, Mexican singer and actor (d. 1989)
- May 21 – Fats Waller, American pianist and comedian (d. 1943)
- May 23 – Libby Holman, US singer and actress (d. 1971)
- May 25 – Kurt Thomas, German choral conductor (d.1973)
- May 26
  - George Formby, English music hall performer, singer, actor and songwriter (d. 1961)
  - Vlado Perlemuter, Lithuanian-born French pianist (d. 2002)
- May 28 – Margaret Harris, opera costume and set designer (d. 2000)
- May 29 – León Zuckert, conductor, composer and arranger (d. 1992)
- June 3 – Jan Peerce, American tenor (d. 1984)
- June 6 – Raymond Burke, clarinettist (d. 1986)
- June 7 – Don Murray, clarinettist (d. 1929)
- June 11 – Pinetop Smith, jazz pianist (d. 1929)
- June 15 – Anna Mahler, musician and sculptor (d. 1988)
- June 21 – Mack Gordon, Polish-born US lyricist (d. 1959)
- June 24
  - Phil Harris, jazz musician (d. 1995)
  - Olga Olgina, Polish opera singer and teacher (d. 1979)
- July 9 – Robert Whitney, British conductor (d. 1986)
- July 14 – Nadia Reisenberg, Litvian pianist (d. 1983)
- July 15
  - Dorothy Fields, librettist and lyricist (d. 1974)
  - Vladimir Bourmeister, Russian dancer and choreographer (d.1971)
- July 16
  - Goffredo Petrassi, composer (d. 2003)
  - Mabel Wayne – US composer (d. 1978)
- July 18 – Harold Spivacke, music librarian and administrator (d. 1977)
- July 24
  - Leo Arnaud – film composer (d. 1991)
  - Anton Dolin – English dancer and choreographer (d.1983)
- July 26 – Jack Westrup, musicologist (d. 1975)
- August 13 – Charles "Buddy" Rogers, actor and singer (d. 1989)
- August 17 – Leopold Nowak, Austrian musicologist (d. 1991)
- August 21 – Count Basie, pianist and bandleader (d. 1984)
- September 2 – Set Svanholm, Swedish operatic tenor (d.1964)
- September 7 –Ernst Glaser, Norwegian violinist, orchestra conductor, and music teacher (died 1979).
- September 17 – Sir Frederick Ashton, dancer and choreographer (d. 1988)
- October 11 – Tita Merello, tango singer, dancer and actress (d. 2002)
- October 20 – Anna Neagle, actress and singer (d. 1986)
- October 24 – Moss Hart, musical theatre director (d. 1961)
- October 26
  - Boris Khaykin, Russian conductor (died 1978)
  - Torbjørn Knutsen, Norwegian composer and violinist (died 1987)
- October 29 – Vivian Ellis, English composer (d. 1996)
- November 1 or November 14 – Aleksey Zhivotov, composer (d. 1964)
- November 11 – Joseph Lockwood, record company executive (d. 1991)
- November 14 – Dick Powell, actor and singer (d. 1963)
- November 18 – Masao Koga, Japanese composer (d. 1978)
- November 20 – Alexandra Danilova, Russian dancer and teacher (d.1997)
- November 21 – Coleman Hawkins, saxophonist (d. 1969)
- November 25 – Toni Ortelli, Italian composer and alpinist (d. 2000)
- December 9 – Elsie Randolph, English actress, dancer and singer (d. 1982)
- December 18 – Wilf Carter, country singer (d. 1966)
- December 26 – Alejo Carpentier, musicologist (d. 1980)
- December 30 – Dmitry Kabalevsky, Soviet pianist and composer (d.1987)
- December 31
  - Umm Kulthum, Egyptian singer and actress (d. 1975)
  - Nathan Milstein, Russian violinist (d.1992)

== Deaths ==
- January 2 – Peter Jurgenson, Russian music publisher (b.1836)
- January 4 – Mitrofan Belyayev, music publisher (b. 1836)
- January 10 – Antoinette Sterling, singer
- January 15 – Eduard Lassen, Danish-born composer and conductor (born 1830)
- January 20 – Maria Louisa Bustill, mother of Paul Robeson (b. 1853) (domestic accident)
- February 8 – Malvina Garrigues, soprano and composer (b. 1825)
- March 10 – Giovanni Cesari, castrato singer (b. 1843)
- March 11 – Charles Grisart, opera composer (b. 1837)
- March 20 – Louisa Pyne, operatic soprano and opera company manager (b. 1832)
- March 31 – Sophia Karp, actress and singer (b. 1861)
- February 8 – Malwine Schnorr von Varolsfeld, German soprano (b.1825)
- April 29 – Nellie Farren, burlesque actress and singer (b. 1848)
- May 1 – Antonín Dvořák, Czech composer (b. 1841)
- May 14 – Morrison Foster, editor and brother to Stephen Foster (born 1823)
- May 19 – Korla Awgust Kocor, conductor and composer (b. 1822)
- May 29 – Maria Paulina Åhman, Swedish harpist (born 1812)
- May 30 – Laura Joyce Bell, contralto singer and actress (b. 1854)
- June 28 – Dan Emmett, founder of the Virginia Minstrels (b. 1815)
- July 13 – Giulia Warwick, operatic soprano and actress (b. 1857)
- July 20 – Arthur Lloyd, music hall entertainer and songwriter (b. 1839)
- August 6 – Eduard Hanslick, music critic (b. 1825)
- September 26 – Patrick Lafcadio Hearn, translator (born 1850)
- October 31 – Dan Leno, English music hall comedian, clog dancer and singer (b. 1860)
- November 30 – Aldine Silliman Kieffer, music teacher and publisher (b. 1840)
- December 31 – James Whiting Vose, American piano manufacturer who founded the firm Vose & Sons (b. 1818)
- date unknown – Antonio Galassi, operatic baritone (b. 1845)
