= Warpath =

Warpath may refer to:

- Great Indian Warpath, a network of trails in eastern North America used by Native Americans

== Characters ==
- Warpath (character), a Marvel Comics character
- Warpath (Transformers), a character in the Transformers franchise

== Games ==
- Warpath (video game), a 2006 video game by Digital Extremes for Microsoft Windows and Xbox
- Warpath: Jurassic Park, a 1999 video game based on the films Jurassic Park and The Lost World: Jurassic Park
- Warpath, a miniature game by Mantic Games
- Warpath, a 1994 video game by Synthetic Reality for Microsoft Windows
- Warpath, a free-to-play ww2 mobile game

== Music ==
- Warpath (Boris album), 2015
- Warpath (Six Feet Under album), 1997
- "Warpath", a song by Esben and the Witch from their 2011 album Violet Cries

== Other uses ==
- Warpath (film), a 1951 film by Byron Haskin
- Warpath, a 2006 novel by David Mack in the Star Trek: Deep Space Nine relaunch novel series

== See also ==
- "On the Warpath", a 1904 instrumental by Raymond A. Browne
