= Op. 100 =

In music, Op. 100 stands for Opus number 100. Compositions that are assigned this number include:

- Brahms – Violin Sonata No. 2
- Dvořák – Violin Sonatina
- Prokofiev - Symphony No. 5
- Reger – Variations and Fugue on a Theme by Hiller
- Schubert – Piano Trio No. 2
- Schumann – The Bride of Messina
- Sibelius – Suite caractéristique, for small orchestra (1922)
