= Don Quichotte auf der Hochzeit des Comacho =

- Serenata by Georg Philipp Telemann
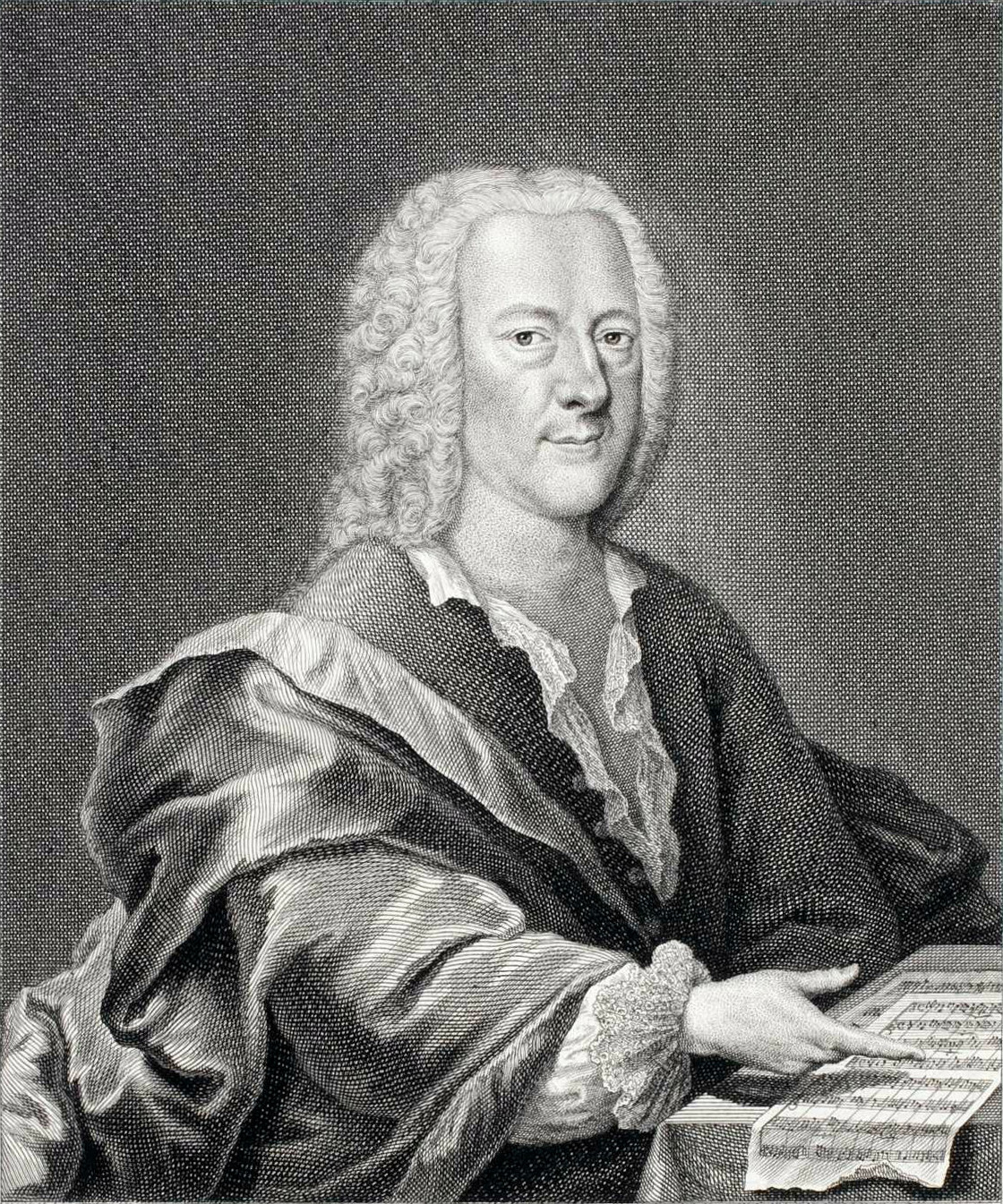
- The composer, c. 1745
- Translation: Don Quixote at Comacho's Wedding
- Other title: Don Quixote der Löwenritter
- Librettist: Daniel Schiebeler
- Language: German
- Based on: Chapter 20 of volume 2 of Cervantes's Don Quixote
- Premiere: 5 November 1761; Konzertsaal auf dem Kamp, Hamburg

Don Quichotte auf der Hochzeit des Comacho (Don Quixote at Comacho's Wedding), TVWV 21:32, is a one-act comic serenata by Georg Philipp Telemann. The libretto by the student poet Daniel Schiebeler is based on chapter 20 of volume 2 of Cervantes's novel Don Quixote. (Note: The bridegroom's name in the novella is Camacho, but in this work it is Comacho.) The opera premiered on 5 November 1761 in Hamburg. When first performed, it was given the title: Don Quichotte auf der Hochzeit des Comacho; later it was also known as Don Quixote der Löwenritter (Don Quixote, the Knight of the Lions).

== History ==
Miguel de Cervantes's novel El ingenioso hidalgo Don Quijote de la Mancha, published in 1605 and 1615, is part of mainstream World literature. The scene of the hero and his squire taking part in the wedding of Comacho was chosen by the poet Daniel Schiebeler (1741–1771) when he was a student aged 18 (Note: His age is also given as 20 years, which is his age when it was premiered.) for the libretto of a Singspiel, entitled Basilio und Quiteria, which he offered to the composer Georg Philipp Telemann, around 60 years his senior. Telemann was agreeable, but made substantial changes to the text.

The opera premiered on 5 November 1761, when Telemann was 80 years old, in a concert hall in Hamburg.

== Roles ==
- Don Quichotte, a knight (bass)
- Sancho Pansa, his squire (bass)
- Pedrillo, a shepherd (soprano)
- Grisostomo, a shepherd (soprano)
- Quiteria, the bride (soprano)
- Comacho, the bridegroom (alto)
- Basilio, a shepherd (tenor)
- Choir of shepherds (SATB)

== Music ==
Telemann uses the story's occasions for humorous effects, including elements from the opera seria, to characterize the noble people, as well as folk music for the peasants. Sancho Pansa is wittily portrayed, for example by "athletic leaps" in his recollection of earlier episode. The choruses often take instrumental and rhythmic ideas from Spanish folk music. A reviewer notes:

In summary, here is a work which should have a wide appeal for its musical diversity, skilful characterization and captivating melodies. In works such as this, the tension between established and newly emerging ideas, musical and dramatic, is to the fore, underlining both Telemann's almost ceaseless interest in experimentation, and a seemingly ever-youthful curiosity which belies his advanced years.

== Recording and performance ==
The opera was recorded in 1994 by the Bremen vocal ensemble for ancient music La Stagione, conducted by Michael Schneider, with Raimund Nolte as Don Quichotte, Michael Schopper as Sancho Pansa, Silke Stapf as Pedrillo and Mechthild Bach as Grisostomo, among others.

The opera was performed again on stage in Magdeburg, where Telemann's operas have been revived from 1929. It was played at the 16th Magdeburger Telemann-Festtage in March 2002, for the first time after almost 250 years. It was performed again in 2006 by the Magdeburg Opera. It was repeated in 2012 as part of the project Telemann für Schüler (Telemann for students), at schools and halls of Magdeburg. It was performed by the Ensemble Barock vokal of the Hochschule für Musik Mainz and the Neumeyer Consort, conducted by Felix Koch.
