= Lottchen am Hofe =

Opera by Johann Adam Hiller

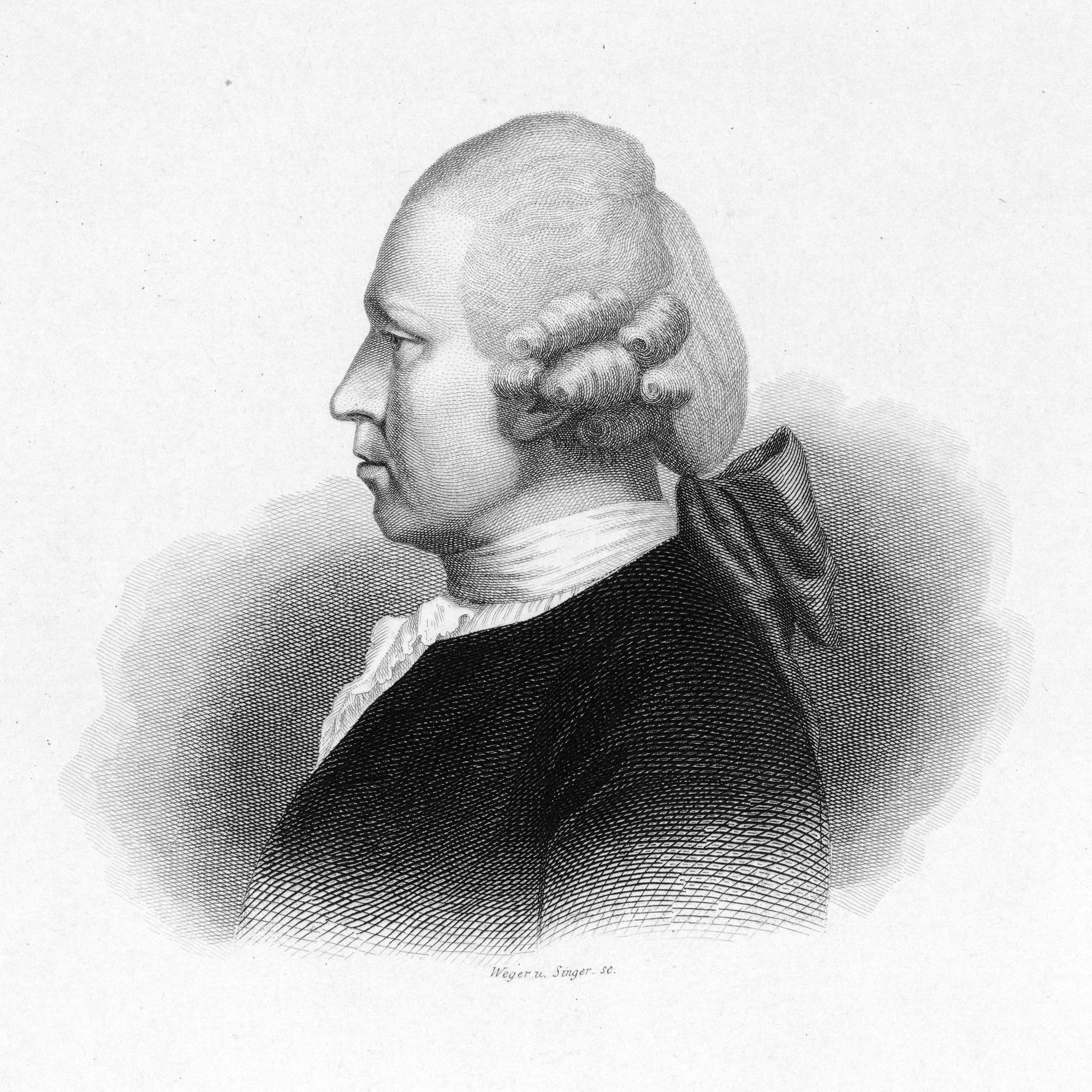
Johann Adam Hiller

Lottchen am Hofe (Lottchen at Court) is a three-act singspiel by the German composer Johann Adam Hiller.

The libretto by Christian Felix Weiße was based on the opéra comique text La caprice amoureux, ou Ninette à la cour by Charles Simon Favart.

== Performance history ==
The opera was first performed in a two-act version at the Rannstädtertor Theater, Leipzig, on 24 April 1767, conducted by the composer.

== Roles ==
Roles, voice types
| Role | Voice type |
|---|---|
| Lottchen | soprano |
| Jürgen, her fiancé | baritone |
| Count Astolph | bass |
| Countess Emilie, his fiancée | soprano |
| Dorine | soprano |
| Fabriz | tenor |

== Synopsis ==
The peasant girl Lottchen flirts with Count Astolph to teach her fiancé Jürgen a lesson. She then unites with Countess Emilie to teach both men a lesson.
