= Song Reader: The Musical =

2016 stage production

Song Reader: The Musical is a stage production with music by Beck, and book and arrangements by Harvey Droke and Daniel Hornal, which premiered at the Capital Fringe Festival in Washington, D.C. in 2016. The music is arrangements from Song Reader, a 2012 Beck concept album released only in sheet music form.

== Synopsis ==
=== Act 1 ===
A conservative mother and father are praising their young soldier at a farewell gathering the night before his deployment to war (America Here's My Boy). The soldier's friends pressure the soldier to have some fun. (Do We – We Do) Wanting to adhere to his father's moral standards he rejects his friends temptations but eventually gives in to his friends desire to go to a strip club called "Old Shanghai".

The club's bouncer has reservations about military people and patronizes them upon entering (Leave Your Razors at the Door). In the club, after Whorenet sings (Change your Shoes) Larcen, the club owner, introduces the headline dancer, "Ziz" who does a dance number (Won't You Fondle Me). Completely engulfed with Ziz's beauty, the soldier arranges to meet her after the show, with the help of a shady character called Pervert who hangs around the club (Get The Money).

Alone in Ziz's room, the soldier expresses to Ziz his love for her. (Us Midnight Stars). He pursues her (If You Come into My Garden of Love) until they have sex. Afterwards, he promises to come back for her when he returns from the war (Ye Midnightand) gives her his crucifix necklace as a token. Larcen and Bouncer barge into the room, beat the soldier and kick him out (Rough on Rats). Fearing that Ziz will leave his club to the soldier, Larcen attempts to manipulate her to sleep with him instead of working off her debt. Larcen continues to persuade her (Sarcophagus In Egypt) but eventually rapes her.

Feeling helpless, Ziz asks Larcen to leave (Please Leave the Light on As You Go) as she looks at the soldier's crucifix necklace she feels a sense of longing and realizes her willingness to change her life (Why Did You Make Me Care?). Ziz and Whorenet plot to get Ziz out of the club (I'm Down). Meanwhile, the soldier and his military friends head off to war.

=== Act 2 ===
Ziz and Whorenet move in together, and Ziz and Soldier narrate their letters to each other. Soldier is becoming more distant, and we learn he was transferred to a forward base and was seriously injured in the war, and his friends died. He is drinking. His doctor and he talk about his relationship with his father.

Back at Old Shanghai, the girls are not happy. (Now That Your Dollar Bills Have Sprouted Wings). Bouncer and Larcen plot to lure Ziz back to the club by starting a legal battle for custody of her newborn child. (The Wolf is on the Hill)

Upon the soldier's arrival, his family goes to the local zoo where he and Ziz reunite (Last Night You were a Dream/Why Does a Heart that Longs to Love You). She is eager to talk to him, but he is cold. (We All Wear Cloaks) Pervert tells the soldier that he saw him have sex with Ziz, and that Larcen raped her after he left, and criticizes the Soldier for leaving Ziz alone with her kid. (Saint Dude).

Larcen tells Ziz that he will sue for custody unless she comes back to the club. (Eyes That Say I Love You). The Soldier enters the scene and tries to fight Larcen. Ziz separates them and tells them all to leave, and tells Larcen that it wasn't consensual sex. Larcen demands evidence. Pervert pops up and says he has everything on videotape. Pervert bargains for the deeds to Old Shanghai and a promise for Larcen to leave town. The Soldier apologizes to Ziz (Sorry). Whorenet enters with Ziz's child which she had been babysitting (America Here's My Boy reprise).

== Characters ==
- Ziz
- Soldier
- Larcen
- Whorenet
- Bouncer
- Pervert
- Mother
- Father

== Musical numbers ==
As appears on the program

(Preshow Music: Title of this Song)

1. America Here's My Boy
2. Do We? We Do
3. Old Shanghai
4. Leave Your Razors at the Door
5. Ziz
6. Fondle Me
7. Get the Money
8. Ye Midnight Stars
9. Garden of Love
10. Rough on Rats
11. Sarcophagus in Egypt
12. Please Leave the Light On
13. Why Did You Make Me Care
14. It's Just Noise
15. Mutilation Rag
16. Dollar Bills
17. The Wolf is on the Hill
18. Last Night you were a Dream
19. Why Does a Heart that Longs to Love You?
20. We All Wear Cloaks
21. Saint Dude
22. Eyes that say I Love You
23. Sorry
24. America Here's My Roy (Reprise)

(Curtain Call: Don't Act Like Your Heart Isn't Hard)
