= Die Jagd =

Opera by Johann Adam Hiller

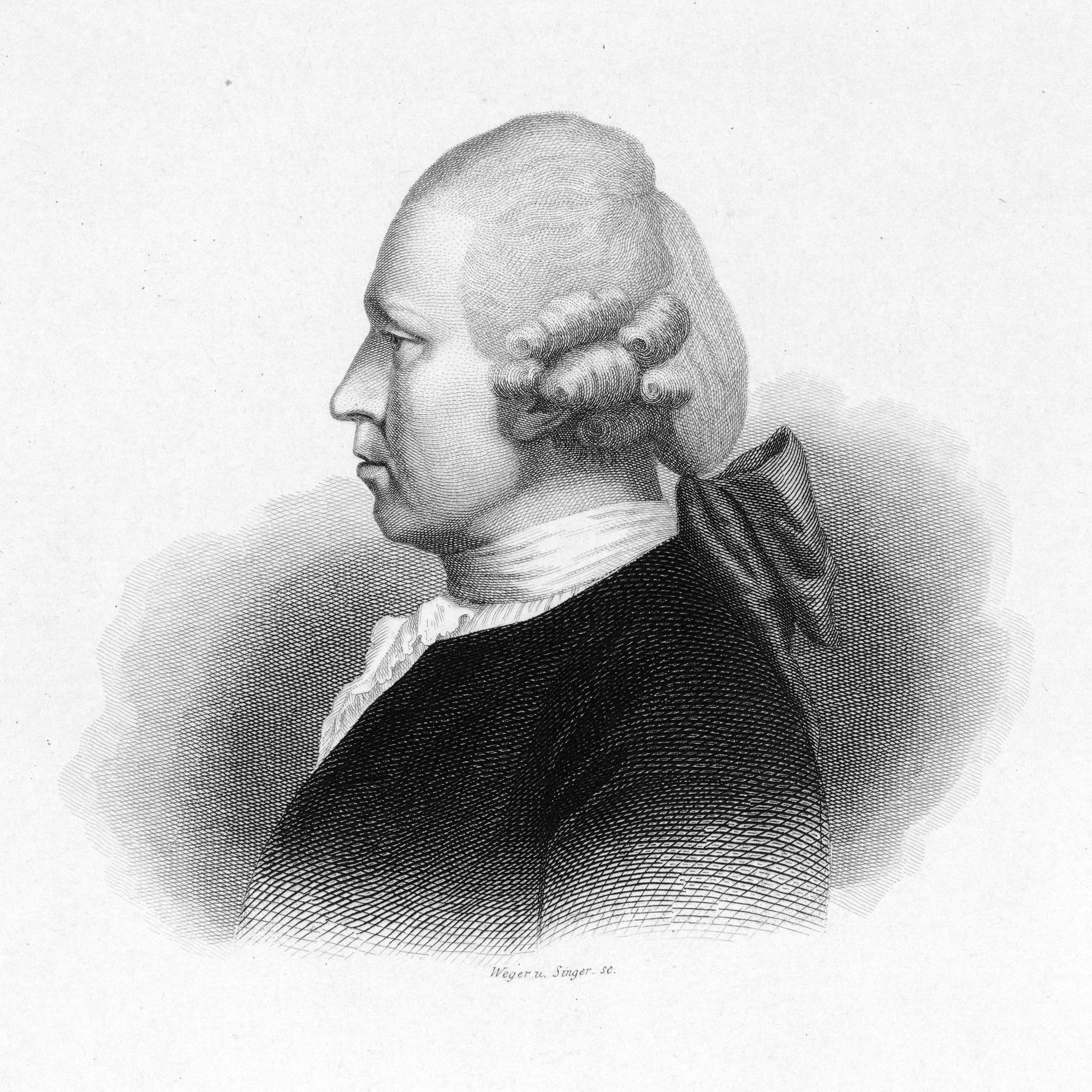
Johann Adam Hiller

Die Jagd (The Hunt) is an opera by the German composer Johann Adam Hiller. It takes the form of a Singspiel in three acts. The libretto by Christian Felix Weiße is based on the plays La partie de chasse de Henri IV by Charles Collé, The King and the Miller of Mansfield by Robert Dodsley, and the opéra comique by Michel-Jean Sedaine (originally set by Monsigny). The opera was first performed at the Schlosstheater, Weimar on 29 January 1770. Die Jagd is considered one of the most important early Singspiele. It was admired by Goethe and Wagner.

== Roles ==
Role	Voice type	Premiere cast, 29 January 1770 Conductor: Johann Adam Hiller
The king	bass	
Michel	tenor	
Marthe	soprano	
Röschen	soprano	
Hännchen	soprano	
Christel	tenor	
Töffel	bass	
Count Schmetterling	spoken role	
Treuwerth	spoken role	
Gürge	spoken role	
Quaas	spoken role	

== Synopsis ==
=== Act 1 ===
The farmer Michel will not permit his daughter Röschen to marry Töffel before the mysterious disappearance of his son Christel's fiancée, Hännchen, has been explained.

=== Act 2 ===
Hännchen returns and explains she had been kidnapped by Count Schmetterling. A storm forces everyone to take cover, including the members of the king's hunting party.

=== Act 3 ===
The king takes refuge in Michel's house but does not say who he is. Hännchen recognises one of his huntsmen as the count who had abducted her. The king reveals his true identity, banishes the count and rewards Michel and his family.

== Sources ==
- The Viking Opera Guide ed. Holden (Viking, 1993)
- Del Teatro (in Italian)
- Casaglia, Gherardo (2005)."Die Jagd, 29 January 1770". L'Almanacco di Gherardo Casaglia (in Italian).
