= Daniel Schiebeler =

German writer

- Born: 25 March 1741; Hamburg
- Died: 19 August 1771 (aged 30); Hamburg
- Education: Gelehrtenschule des Johanneums; University of Göttingen; Leipzig University
- Occupations: Writer; Librettist; Poet; Hymnwriter

Daniel Schiebeler (25 March 1741 – 19 August 1771) was a German writer, poet, librettist and Protestant hymnwriter. He wrote librettos for operas and oratorios, set by composers such as Georg Philipp Telemann, Johann Adam Hiller and Carl Philipp Emanuel Bach.

== Career ==
Born in Hamburg as the son of a merchant, Schiebeler attended the school Gelehrtenschule des Johanneums, after education by a private tutor who introduced him to novels. Schiebeler could read them in English, French, Italian and Spanish. He studied law without enthusiasm, from 1763 in Göttingen and from 1765 in Leipzig, graduating in 1768 with a dissertation "De modo poenarum". He was employed the same year by the Hamburger Dom. Schiebeler died of tuberculosis.

== Work ==
Schiebeler wrote several librettos for operas and oratorios, such as Basilio und Quiteria based on an episode from Cervantes' Don Quixote. He was a student, age 18, when he selected the scene of the hero and his squire taking part in the wedding of Camacho. Based on his extensive studies of Spanish literature, he was able to work from the original Spanish text. His libretto is subtitled "Singgedicht für das Theater" ("dramatic libretto for the theater") and has detailed directions for a performance. Schiebeler offered the libretto to Georg Philipp Telemann, who set it as an opera, Don Quichotte auf der Hochzeit des Comacho, not without making several practical changes to the libretto. The opera premiered on 5 November 1761 in the concert hall "Auf dem Kamp" in Hamburg, because Hamburg had no working opera house at the time. Schiebeler wrote the libretto for Johann Adam Hiller's Lisuart und Dariolette oder Die Frage und die Antwort, which premiered in a two-act version on 25 November 1766 at the Theater am Rannstädter Thore in Leipzig. Schiebeler wrote the libretto for the dramatic oratorio Die Israeliten in der Wüste, set to music by Carl Philipp Emanuel Bach, which premiered on 1 November 1769 in Hamburg.

== Bibliography ==
- Baselt, Bernd, ed. (1991). Don Quichotte auf der Hochzeit des Comacho: Comic opera-serenata in one act. A-R Editions. ISBN 9780895792594.
- Esquival-Heinemann, Bárbara P. (2007). Altenberg, Tilmann; Meyer-Minnemann, Klaus (eds.). Don Quijote in der deutschsprachigen Oper (PDF) (in German). University Of Hamburg. pp. 235–261. ISBN 978-3-937816-28-9.
- Rosenberg, Jesse (2015). Don Quichotte (PDF). Haymarket Opera. pp. 8–9.
- Erich Schmidt (1890). "Schiebeler, Daniel" . Allgemeine Deutsche Biographie (in German). Vol. 31. Leipzig: Duncker & Humblot. pp. 176–178.
