= Lisuart und Dariolette =

Opera by Johann Adam Hiller

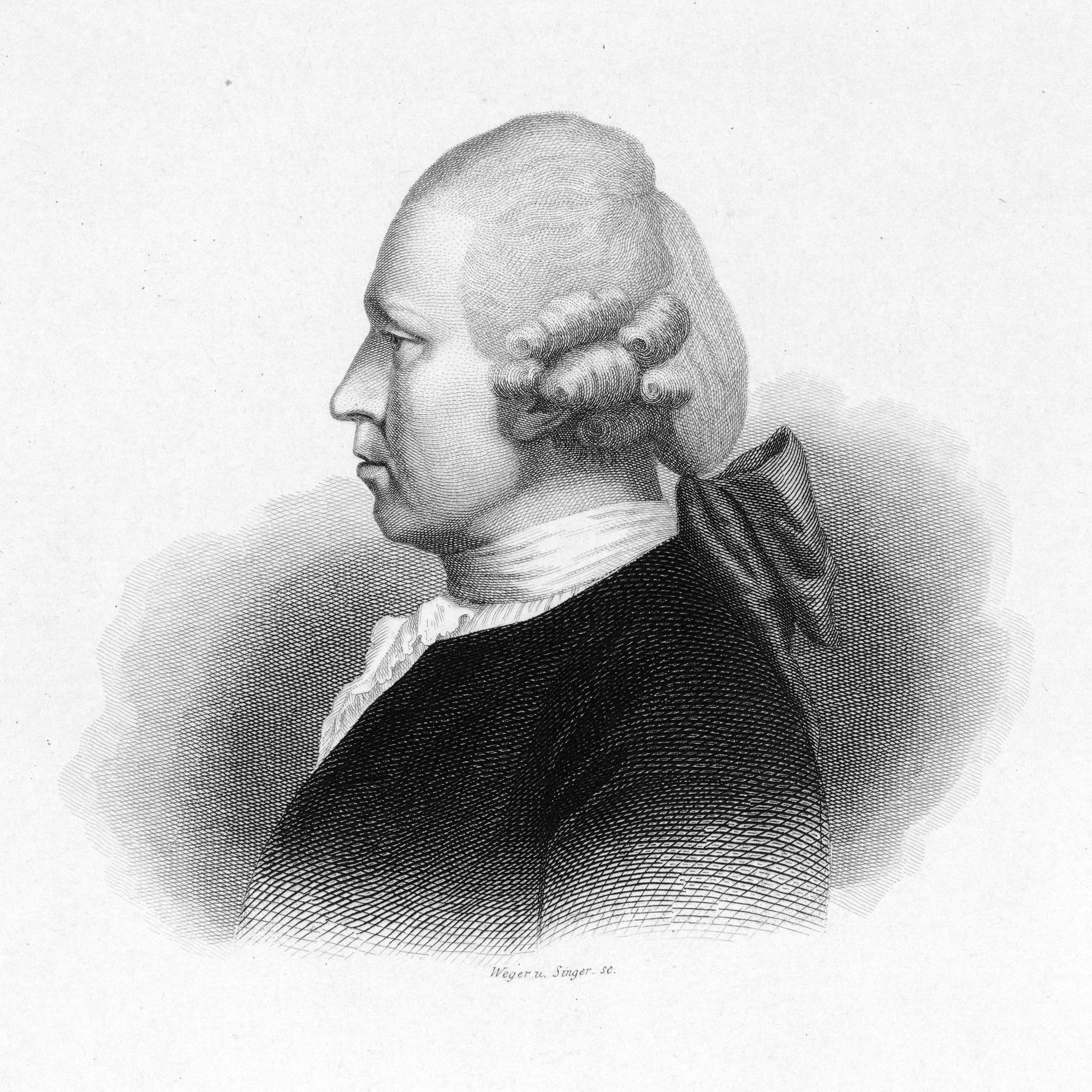
Johann Adam Hiller

Lisuart und Dariolette, oder Die Frage und die Antwort (Lisuart and Dariolette, or The Question and the Answer) is a 'romantisch-comische Oper' (lit. 'romantic-comic opera') by the German composer Johann Adam Hiller.

The libretto was by Daniel Schiebeler based on La fée Urgèle ou Ce qui plaît aux dames by Charles Simon Favart, itself derived from The Wife of Bath's Tale by Geoffrey Chaucer.

== Performance history ==
The opera was first performed in a two-act version at the Rannstädtertor Theater, Leipzig on 25 November 1766, conducted by the composer. A revised version in three acts was produced on 7 January 1767.

== Roles ==
roles, voice types
Role	Voice type
Queen Ginevra of England	soprano
Dariolette, her daughter	soprano
Lisuart, a knight	tenor
Derwin, his squire	bass

== Synopsis ==
Queen Ginevra of England sends the knight Lisuart to find her lost daughter Dariolette. In the course of his mission, Lisuart has to answer the riddle: "What gives women the most pleasure?"
