= Asia (Boris album) =

Studio album by Boris
- Released: 2 May 2015
- Recorded: 2015
- Genres: Noise; drone
- Length: 41:22
- Label: Fangs Anal Satan
- Producer: Boris

Boris chronology
Warpath (2015)	Asia (2015)	Gensho (2016)

Asia is the twenty-second studio album by Japanese rock band Boris. It was first announced via the band's Facebook page on April 30 2015, along with simultaneous releases of Urban Dance and Warpath. They were first available on tour with Endon, making their release date May 2.

The album is almost entirely noise experimentation, with elements of drone music as well, and is entirely instrumental, all in keeping with the styles used on its simultaneously-released companions, as well as previous drone albums like The Thing Which Solomon Overlooked - Chronicle.

The cover art posted by the band is inaccurate to the physical product, which features a young Japanese girl dressed as a ballerina.

== Track listing ==
No.	Title	Length
1.	"Terracotta Warrior"	20:38
2.	"Ant Hill"	10:13
3.	"Talkative Lord vs Silent Master"	10:31
Total length:		41:22

== Personnel ==
- Atsuo
- Wata
- Takeshi
