= Urban Dance =

Studio album by Boris
- Released: 2 May 2015
- Recorded: 2015
- Genre: Post-rock
- Length: 42:02
- Label: Fangs Anal Satan
- Producer: Boris

Boris chronology
The Thing Which Solomon Overlooked Extra (2014)	Urban Dance (2015)	Warpath (2015)

Urban Dance is the twentieth studio album by Japanese rock band Boris. It was first announced via the band's Facebook page on April 30, along with simultaneous releases of Warpath and Asia. They were first available on tour with Endon, making their release date May 2.

Of the three simultaneous releases, this album is the only one bearing resemblance to rock-based music, with "Surrender" in particular recalling 2014's Noise. Beyond its use of soaring vocals – their only appearance on any of the three albums – the song, as well as "Endless," features pronounced post-rock influence. These are also the only two songs to feature drums. The rest of the material on the album fits the noise, experimental and drone facets explored further on Warpath and Asia. Its combination of more traditional rock songs and drone pieces makes it similar in structure to The Thing Which Solomon Overlooked - Chronicle's fourth disc ("Extra").

The cover art posted by the band is inaccurate to the physical product, which features a young Japanese girl dressed as a ballerina.

== Track listing ==
No.	Title	Length
1.	"Un, deux, trois" (French for "One, Two, Three")	4:30
2.	"Surrender"	7:45
3.	"Choreographer"	8:46
4.	"Endless"	9:43
5.	"Game of Death"	11:19
Total length:		42:02

== Personnel ==
- Atsuo
- Wata
- Takeshi
