= Gottlieb Rabener =

German writer (1714–1771)

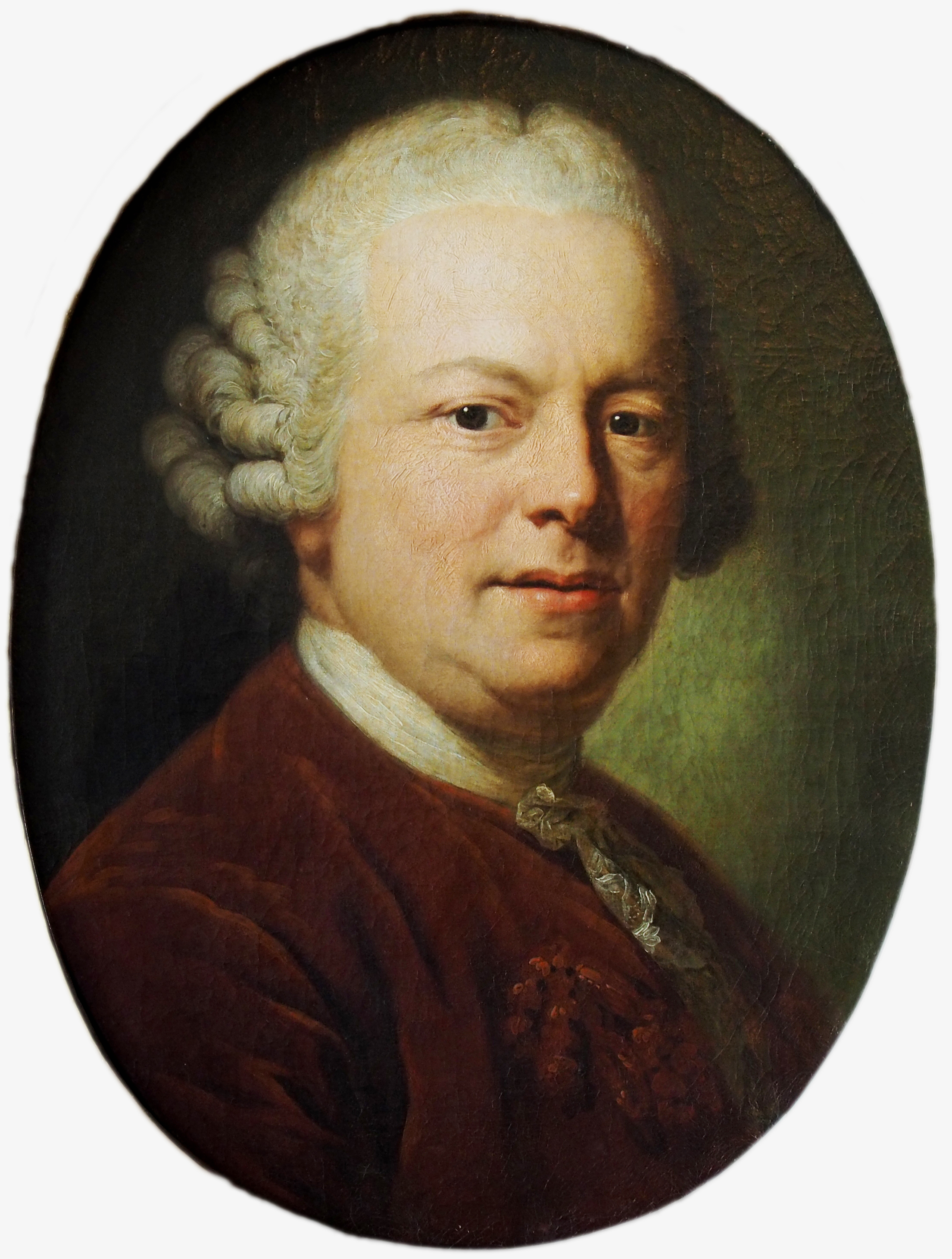
Gottlieb Wilhelm Rabener

Gottlieb Wilhelm Rabener (17 September 1714 – 22 March 1771), was a German writer of prose satires and publicist of the Enlightenment. He was born at Wachau near Leipzig, and he died at Dresden.

== Life ==
In 1741 he made his debut as satirist in Schwabe's Belustigungen des Verstandes und Witzes, and was subsequently a contributor to the Bremer Beitrage. Rabener's satires are mainly levelled at the follies of the middle classes.

The papers which he published in the Bremer Beitrage were subsequently collected in a Sammlung satirischer Schriften (2 vols., 1751), to which two volumes were added in 1755.

Rabener is especially notorious for his parodic dissertation, Hinkmars von Repkow Noten Ohne Text, which levels a snide charge against the futility and bankruptcy of the practice of footnoting, by consisting entirely of footnotes itself. Rabener cavalierly claimed that since footnotes and endnotes seemed to have become the key to winning lasting authorial fame, he had accordingly composed his dissertation entirely in notes, and left it to others to produce the text he had annotated proleptically.

People like Benjamin Franklin and Thomas Paine were influenced by the Enlightenment, it could be said Rabener and other writers of his time were a driving force behind this movement.

He came to Dresden in 1753, lost most of his manuscripts during the Seven Year War, at the siege of Dresden by the Prussians in July 1760. But his complete works "Briefe" were published in 1772 by Christian Felix Weiße.

By 1763 Rabener was promoted to the tax council in Dresden, he suffers his first stroke in 1767, a painting titled and dated verso,"Steuerralh Gottlieb Wilhelm Rabener," oil on canvas is created after his second stroke in 1769 now currently held in a private collection. Not much is known of his tax collecting for Frederick the Great or the last years before his death, but it seems the strokes could have been a factor.
