= Christian Felix Weiße =

German writer and pedagogue (1726–1804)

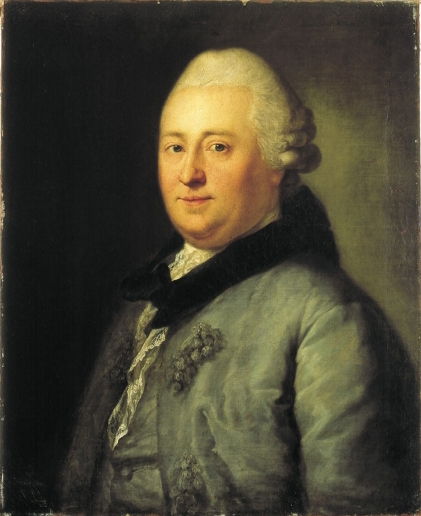
Christian Felix Weiße (1769) by Anton Graff

Christian Felix Weiße (1726–1804) was a German writer and pedagogue. Weiße was among the leading representatives of the Enlightenment in Germany and is regarded as the founder of German children's literature.

== Life ==
Weiße was born as twin on 28 January 1726 in Annaberg in the Ore Mountains as the son of Christian Heinrich Weiße and his wife, Christian Elisabeth. His father was rector at a Latin school and teacher for oriental and modern European languages. When Weiße was one year old, the family moved to Altenburg, Thuringia, 45 km south of Leipzig, where he then attended the Gymnasium and made his first attempts at writing poetry. His father had died in 1730.

His family moved then to Leipzig, where he studied philology and theology from 1745 until 1750 at Leipzig University. During this time, he became acquainted with Christian Fürchtegott Gellert, Gotthold Ephraim Lessing, Friederike Caroline Neuber, Gottlieb Rabener and Ewald Christian von Kleist.

After he finished his studies, Weiße became a private tutor to the Count Geyersberg, also a student in Leipzig. Friedrich Nicolai asked Weiße in 1759 to become editor of the magazine Bibliothek der schönen Wissenschaften (Library of the Beautiful Sciences) which Nicolai had founded two years before; Weiße published this magazine and its successor until 1788. The same year, 1759, Weiße travelled to Paris; on his return, he relinquished the tutor position and became social companion to Count Schulenburg on the count's castle in Burgscheidungen.

Weiße became district tax collector in Leipzig in 1762 and married in the following year Christiane Platner, the daughter of a renowned Leipzig surgeon and sister of Ernst Platner. In 1790, the patronage of Count Schulenburg allowed him to acquire the castle in Stötteritz (today part of Leipzig). He redesigned it completely and established an English garden. The property changed from an estate to a summerhouse and garden where a salon sees guests like Christian Garve, Christoph Martin Wieland, Moritz August von Thümmel and Jean Paul.

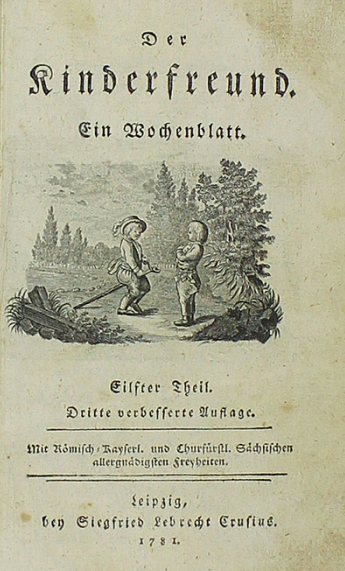
Children's magazine Der Kinderfreund (part 11, 1781).

Apart from his poetry and plays, Weiße had great success with his magazine Der Kinderfreund (The Children's Friend) which he published from 1775 until 1782 in 24 volumes; it is regarded as the first magazine for children in Germany. Four of his poems were set to music by Wolfgang Amadeus Mozart. Ludwig van Beethoven set Weiße's poem "Der Kuß" (Ich war bei Chloën, ganz allein) to music in 1822. Weiße was not appreciated by the literary representatives of the then new movement, Sturm und Drang. His most lasting success were the librettos to Johann Adam Hiller's Singspiele.

Weiße died on 16 December 1804 in Stötteritz; he is buried in the Alter Johannisfriedhof in Leipzig. He was survived by his wife who died in 1813. A notable child from this marriage was the historian and jurist Christian Ernst Weiße.

== Works ==
Librettos Almost all of the works by Johann Adam Hiller are set to librettos by Weiße, in particular:

- Die verwandelten Weiber (1766)
- Lottchen am Hofe (1767)
- Die Jagd, (1770)

Works by other composers include:

- Der Dorfbarbier, music (1771) by Christian Gottlob Neefe and Johann Adam Hiller
- Romeo und Julie by Georg Benda is based on Weiße's translation of Shakespeare's Romeo and Juliet

Comedies

- Die Freundschaft auf der Probe (1768) (Friendship Tested)
- Collection in 3 volumes (1783)

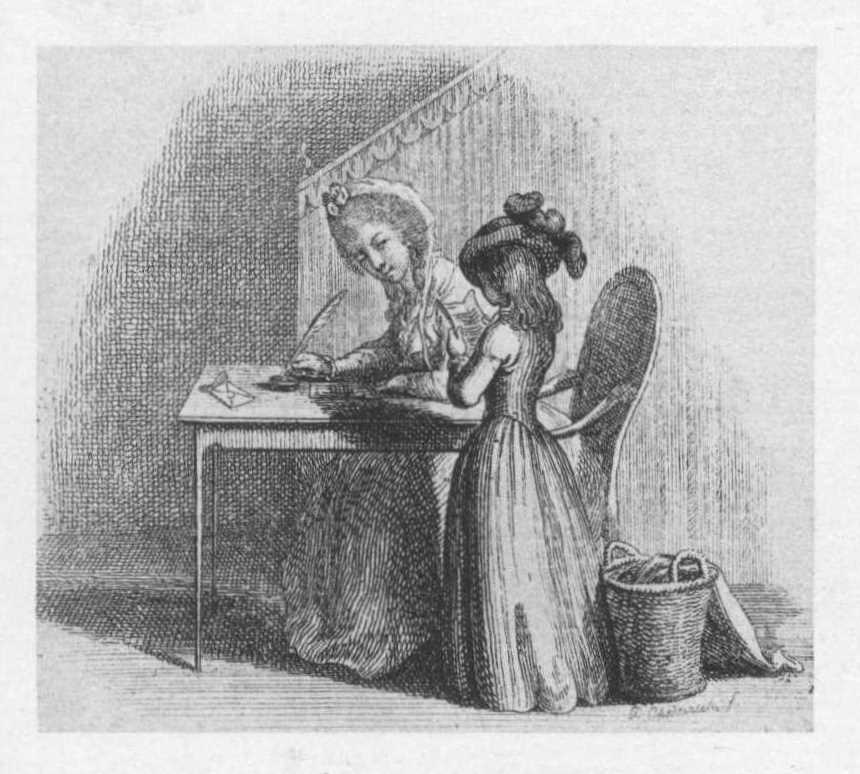
1784 title vignette to Briefwechsel der Familie des Kinderfreundes, by Daniel Chodowiecki

Tragedies

- Die Befreyung von Theben (1764) (The Liberation of Thebes)
- Collection in 5 volumes (1776–1780)

Children's books and non-fiction

- Beytrag zum deutschen Theater (5 volumes, 1759–1768) (Contribution to the German Theatre)
- Kleine Lieder für Kinder (1766) (Little Songs for Children)
- Neues ABC-Buch (1772) (New Alphabet Book)
- Der Kinderfreund (24 volumes, 1775–1782) (The Children's Friend)
- Briefwechsel der Familie des Kinderfreundes (12 volumes, 1784–1792) (Letters from the Family of the Children's Friend)
- Achthundert neue noch nie gedruckte Räthsel (1791) (Eight hundred Never-Before Printed Riddles)
- Christian Felix Weißens Selbstbiographie (1806) (Autobiography)
