= Ain't It Funny What a Difference Just a Few Hours Make =

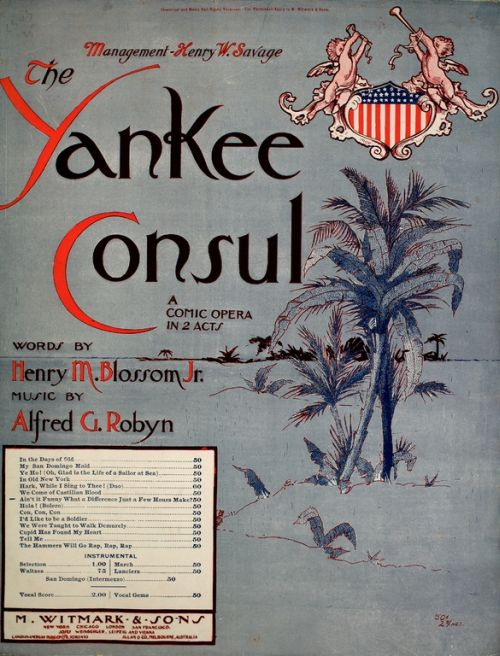
- Sheet music cover, 1903

Song
- Published: 1903
- Genre: Showtune
- Composer(s): Alfred G. Robyn
- Lyricist(s): Henry M. Blossom, Jr.

"Ain't It Funny What a Difference Just a Few Hours Make" is a popular song, introduced in the 1904 Broadway show The Yankee Consul, and briefly becoming a standard.

The song is a lament by Abijah Booze, the American Consul in Puerto Plata, who regrets having to rise early. Booze's role in the premier was played by Raymond Hitchcock, his first starring role. The title is a refrain found throughout the song:

Ain't it funny what a difference just a few hours make?

Although almost completely forgotten today, a version of the song by a popular singer of the time known as Billy Murray is downloadable at several websites. His version was released by Victor Records.

== See also ==
- 1904 in music

== Bibliography ==
- Blossom, Henry M., Jr.; Robyn, Alfred G.. "Ain't It Funny What a Difference Just a Few Hours Make" (sheet music). New York: M. Withark & Sons (1903).
- Blossom, Henry M., Jr.; Robyn, Alfred G.. The Yankee Consul: A Musical Comedy. New York: M. Withark & Sons (1903).
- Green, Stanley. Encyclopedia of the Musical Theatre. Da Capo Press (1980)
