= Die Israeliten in der Wüste =

Oratorio by Carl Philipp Emanuel Bach

- Oratorio by Carl Philipp Emanuel Bach
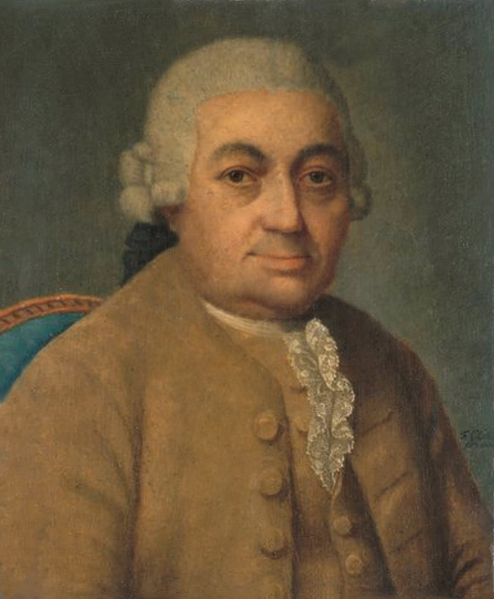
- English: The Israelites in the Desert
- Occasion: Consecration of the Lazarettkirche
- Text: by Daniel Schiebeler
- Language: German
- Composed: 1768: Hamburg
- Published: 1775
- Movements: 28
- Vocal: SATB choir and solo
- Instrumental: Orchestra

Die Israeliten in der Wüste (The Israelites in the Desert) is an oratorio by Carl Philipp Emanuel Bach.

== Background ==
While known mainly for his works in other genres, Carl Philipp Emanuel Bach also composed several oratorios during his career as a composer. After arriving in Hamburg in 1768, he found himself in an atmosphere that was much more conducive to musical creativity than his previous post in Berlin had provided him. With his new post came many new responsibilities and Bach found himself composing pieces in the longer symphony and concerto genres. One of his first compositions at his new Hamburg post was the oratorio Die Israeliten in der Wüste (The Israelites in the Desert), which he began in the second half of 1768 and finished early in 1769. The piece was based on a libretto by German librettist Daniel Schiebeler who, rather than creating the libretto by using direct quotes from scripture, used poetry based on scripture.

Bach wrote the oratorio for the consecration of the Lazarettkirche in 1769 and the score was first printed in 1775. He wrote the piece with the intention that it be performed "not only on a solemn occasion, but at any time, inside or outside the Church". This hope ultimately came to fruition when the piece was later performed outside of German-speaking areas and gained a reputation as a concert piece rather than a solely sacred piece, a status it maintained into the next century. Part of the reason for this was that in Hamburg, much better performers, facilities, and funds were available to produce such a technically complicated piece. Of course, the shift this piece underwent in moving from the church to the concert hall was accompanied by necessary changes in style and production, but as time has shown, Bach was able to adjust seamlessly to the changes in the times.

Bach's overall style of writing oratorio is clearly influenced by the earlier German-British composer George Frideric Handel. Bach's themes, musical effects, and affinity for the Old Testament all indicate a respect for and heavy influence by Handel's oratorios, particularly, one of his better-known works, Messiah.

== Piece ==
Die Israeliten in der Wüste is an oratorio based on the Old Testament story of the pain and suffering of the Israelites in the desert. In this piece, Bach keeps up with the changing musical ideas of the time by abandoning his typical styles in favor of adopting an empfindsam quality, using every movement of the piece to underscore the drama and move the affections to more fully engage the listener. Each separate movement has a mood or feeling of its own, but together, Bach’s goal is to create an empfindsam tone and ultimately recreate some of his characters’ emotions. Throughout the first part of the oratorio, Bach creates a feeling of sadness and desperation as the Israelites seem hopelessly lost in the desert. They bemoan their misfortune and begin to lose their faith as their situation becomes more and more bleak. However, the mood of the piece changes significantly when Moses discovers a spring and hope is restored among the Israelites. Once more, they regain their faith and begin giving praise to God, thanking Him for saving them once again.

The oratorio's second part continues the story begins with a Handelian theme, most likely added because of the great success of Handel's Messiah in Hamburg. However, it is somewhat jarring next to the poetic words in the libretto and slow, sad music that follows. Like other composers at the time, Bach treated music as a way to express the words written in the libretto. As such, the tempo at the beginning of the second part (adagio), the minor key, and Bach's crescendo aid in creating the mood of longing being experienced by the characters. Additionally, significant words in the libretto are often musically embellished with trills or higher notes so as to stress their importance.

The piece is made up primarily of three types of movements: choruses, recitatives, and arias. The choruses are generally sung by a large ensemble of the Israelites. They are primarily homophonic, with vocal melodies that mostly follow the orchestral arrangement. Bach's recitatives are mostly recitativo secco, or plain recitative. These recitatives are accompanied by a continuo but no other instruments. Bach also uses recitativo accompagnato, which utilizes other instruments so as to be more emotionally expressive. The arias are typically sung by principal characters and convey emotion, rather than plot advancement like recitatives. Like the other movements, Bach uses his arias to convey intense emotion, to fit in with his empfindsam approach to the oratorio. They are written in a da capo form, which is organized so as to reflect the pattern of human emotion as it occurs.

Because Bach treats the music and emotions of the piece as more of a sacred drama than an actual oratorio, the similarities between Bach and Handel are striking. Unique in many ways, Bach even wrote in an obbligato figure for the bassoon, an uncommon practice in music at that time as well as today. The piece provided what is now a relatively commonly played bassoon piece.

In its time, this piece was popular enough that Bach chose to publish it, a practice which, at the time, was saved for only the most successful pieces. Since then, however, it has become known as one of the pieces that assisted in moving the oratorio out of the church and into secular performance venues, being performed less in churches than many of the oratorios before it.

== Movements ==
Part I

1. Chor der Israeliten – Die Zunge klebt
2. Recit. – Ist dieses Abrams Gott?
3. Arie – Will er, dass sein Volk verderbe?
4. Recit. – Verehrt des Ew'gen Willen
5. Arie – Bis hie her hat er
6. Recit. – Warum verliessen wir Aegyptans blühend Land
7. Arie – O! bringet uns zu jenen Mauren
8. Recit. – Für euch seht Moses stets um neue Huld
9. Symphonie
10. Recit. – Welch ein Geschrey tönt in mein Ohr?
11. Chor der Israeliten – Du bist der Ur-spring unsrer Noth
12. Recit. – Undankbar Volk, hast du die Werke vol!
13. Duett – Umsonst sind unsre Zahren
14. Accompagnement – Gott, meiner Vater Gott, was lassest
15. Arie – Gott, Gott, Gott, sieh dein Volk
16. Chor der Israeliten – O Wunder! O Wunder!

Part II

17. Recit. – Verdienet habt ihr ihn, den Zorn des Herrn
18. Arie; Chor [der Israeliten] – Gott Israels, empfange im
19. Recit. – Wie nah war uns der Tod! und, o! wie wunderbar
20. Arie – Vor des Mittags heissen Strahlen
21. Accompagnement – O Freunde, Kinder, mein Gebet hat
22. Recit. – Beneidenswerth, die ihren Sohn ihn nennt!
23. Arie – O, selig, o selig
24. Recit. – Hofft auf den Ew'gen, harret sein
25. Chor [der Israeliten] – Verheissner Gottes, welcher
26. Choral – Was der alten Vater Shaar
27. Recit. – O Heil der Welt du bist erschienen
28. Chor [der Israeliten] – Lass dein Wort, das uns erschallt
