= Victor Jacobi =

Hungarian composer (1883–1921)

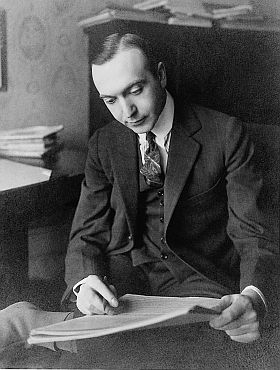
Viktor Jacobi

Victor Jacobi (22 October 1883 – 10 December 1921) was a Hungarian operetta composer.

He studied at the Zeneakadémia (Academy of Music) in Budapest at the same time as the noted Hungarian composers Imre Kálmán and Albert Szirmai. Jacobi began his career as "Jakabfi Viktor" on 17 December 1904 with the operetta "A rátartós királykisasszony".

His most famous operetta is "Szibill". The performance of this operetta was cancelled in London because of the beginning of World War I.

After that, he left London for the United States and during his stay in New York City he became very ill. He died there on 10 December 1921 at 38 years old of Acute Lymphocytic Leukemia.

== Works ==
- 1904: A rátartós királykisasszony (The Haughty Princess)
- 1905: Legvitézebb Huszár (The Brave Hussar)
- 1906: A tengerszem tündére (The Nautical Fairy)
- 1907: Tüskerózsa (Rambler Rose)
- 1908: Van, de nincs (There Is, But There Isn't)
- 1909: Jánoska
- 1911: Leányvásár (adapted in 1913 as The Marriage Market and in 1914 as Szibill (Sybill))
- 1919: Apple Blossoms, with Fritz Kreisler
- 1921: The Love Letter
