= The Haughty Princess =

- by Victor Jacobi
- Native name: A rátartós királykisasszony
- Genre: Operetta
- Language: Hungarian

The Haughty Princess (A rátartós királykisasszony) is an operetta by the Hungarian composer Victor Jacobi. As his first operetta it was premiered on December 17, 1904 in Budapest. The libretto is by Jenő Heltai, who rewrote a folk tale by Holger Drachmann.

== Synopsis ==
The haughty princess is the story of a princess who turns away all her suitors. Her father in time is tired of searching for suitors for his ungrateful daughter, and says that, in retaliation for her ungratefulness, he will give her to the first beggar who comes calling. the next day a hairy beggar comes at the break of dawn asking for the princess' hand in marriage and it is given. The princess is led away screaming and kicking and as she and her new husband travel on her tears cease and she begins to study the scenery. As she and her husband walk on, she asks him who the great wood, the huge town, and the lavish farms they pass belong to. Soon enough she finds that every one of those belong to one of the most rich and handsome kings she had turned away. When they get to the small cottage in the woods he gives her a cotton dress and handkerchief and bids her make a fire so they can sleep. the next day he comes home with a needle and thread and asks her to mend, but the needle draws blood from her soft hands and she cries. not able to bear her tears, he takes the needle and thread back and bids her do it no more. the day after that he comes home with wicker so she can make baskets, the wood bruises her fingers though and she cries, so he takes it from her and bids her do it no more. After this he finds her employment at her own castle as a scullery maid. the princess works hard and without complaint her haughty spirit slowly turning into a kind giving one. One morning she and the head cook hear that some rich and handsome king from the next kingdom is getting married at the castle. Together she and the cook peek through the kitchen door, in hopes of catching a glimpse of the mystery man in the parlour. Just as they peek out the door he sees them "your handsome helper must pay for her peeking!" he says and taking the princess he dances a fast jig with her. much to her embarrassment the cakes and food she had stored in her pockets to feed herself and her husband fly out and she tries to flee the room. the mystery king catches her before she can go and explains that he is her husband the beggar. Her father had given her to him to drive the petty nature out of her. Soon the beloved princess is dressed and made ready for the wedding and they live happily ever after.
