= Suite caractéristique =

Concert suite in by Jean Sibelius (1922)

- Concert suite by Jean Sibelius
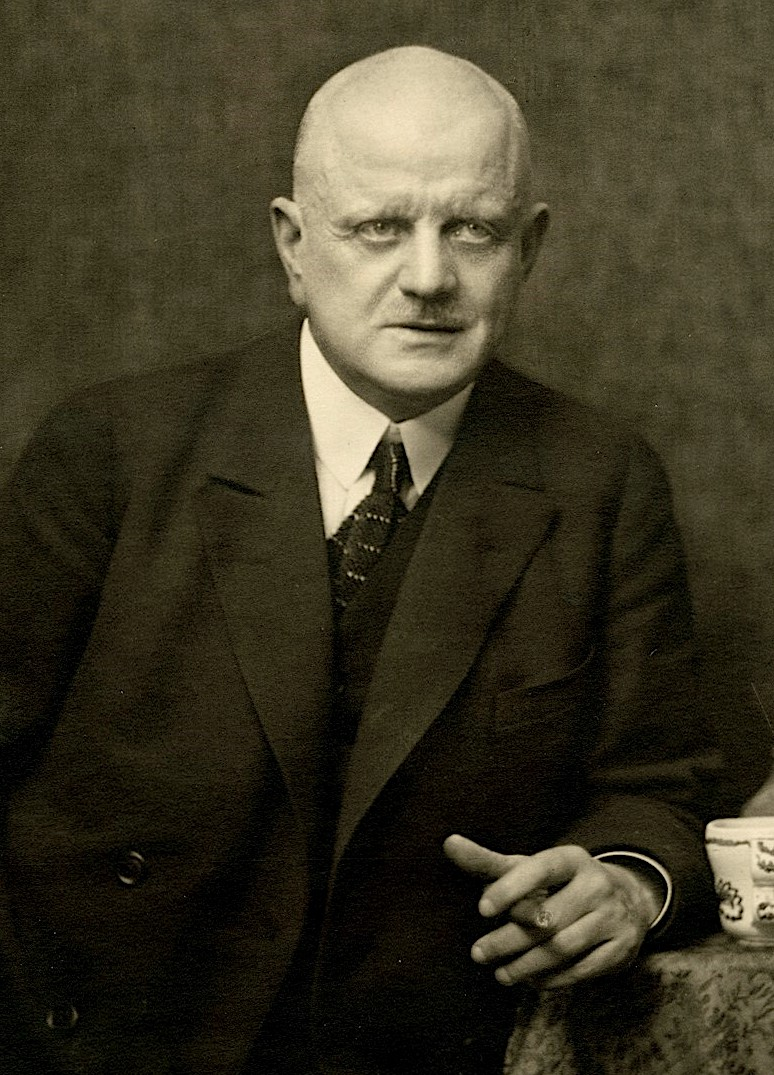
- The composer (c. 1923)
- Opus: 100
- Composed: 1922
- Publisher: Hansen (1923)
- Duration: 6 mins.
- Movements: 3

Premiere
- Date: 19 February 1923
- Location: Helsinki, Finland
- Conductor: Jean Sibelius
- Performers: Helsinki Philharmonic Orchestra

The Suite caractéristique, Op. 100, is a three-movement concert suite for harp and string orchestra written in 1922 by the Finnish composer Jean Sibelius.

== Structure ==
The Suite caractéristique is in three movements, each of which lacks descriptive title and is known instead by its tempo marking. The movements are as follows:

1. Vivo
2. Lento
3. Comodo

== Discography ==
No.	Conductor	Ensemble	Rec. (Note: Refers to the year in which the performers recorded the work; this may not be the same as the year in which the recording was first released to the general public.)	Time	Recording venue	Label	Ref.
1	Pekka Helasvuo	Finlandia Sinfonietta	1985	6:05	Laurentius Hall	Finlandia	(Note: P. Helasvuo–Finlandia (FACD 354) 1986)
2	Neeme Järvi	Gothenburg Symphony Orchestra	1987	5:02	Gothenburg Concert Hall	BIS	(Note: N. Järvi–BIS (CD–384) 1988)
3	Péter Csaba	Virtuosi di Kuhmo		5:17		Ondine	(Note: P. Csaba–Ondine (ODE 830–2) 1994)
4	Tuomas Hannikainen	Tapiola Sinfonietta	2000	4:27	Tapiola Hall, Espoo Cultural Centre	Ondine	(Note: T. Hannikainen–Ondine (ODE 952–2) 2000)
5	Osmo Vänskä	Lahti Symphony Orchestra	2005	4:55	Sibelius Hall	BIS	(Note: O. Vänskä–BIS (CD–1921/23) 2009)

== Notes, references, and sources ==
Notes

Sources

- Barnett, Andrew (2007). Sibelius. New Haven: Yale University Press. ISBN 978-0-300-11159-0.
- Dahlström, Fabian [in Swedish] (2003). Jean Sibelius: Thematisch-bibliographisches Verzeichnis seiner Werke [Jean Sibelius: A Thematic Bibliographic Index of His Works] (in German). Wiesbaden: Breitkopf & Härtel. ISBN 3-7651-0333-0.
- Tawaststjerna, Erik (2008) [1978/1988; trans. 1997]. Sibelius: Volume III, 1914–1957. Translated by Layton, Robert. London: Faber and Faber. ISBN 978-0-571-24774-5.
