= Warpath (Boris album) =

Studio album by Boris
- Released: 2 May 2015
- Recorded: 2015
- Genre: Noise; drone
- Length: 39:21
- Label: Fangs Anal Satan
- Producer: Boris

Boris chronology
Urban Dance (2015)	Warpath (2015)	Asia (2015)

Warpath is the twenty-first studio album by Japanese rock band Boris. It was first announced via the band's Facebook page on April 30, along with simultaneous releases of Urban Dance and Asia. They were first available on tour with Endon, making their release date May 2.

The album is entirely instrumental drone and noise experimentation, very similar to Asia and most of Urban Dance as well as past albums such as The Thing Which Solomon Overlooked - Chronicle.

The cover art posted by the band is different from the physical product, which features a young Japanese girl dressed as a ballerina.

== Track listing ==
No.	Title	Length
1.	"Midgard Schlange"	11:19
2.	"Behind the Owl"	9:20
3.	"Dreamy Eyed Panjandrum"	8:10
4.	"Voo-vah"	10:32
Total length:		39:21

== Personnel ==
- Atsuo
- Wata
- Takeshi
