= Die verwandelten Weiber =

Opera by Johann Adam Hiller

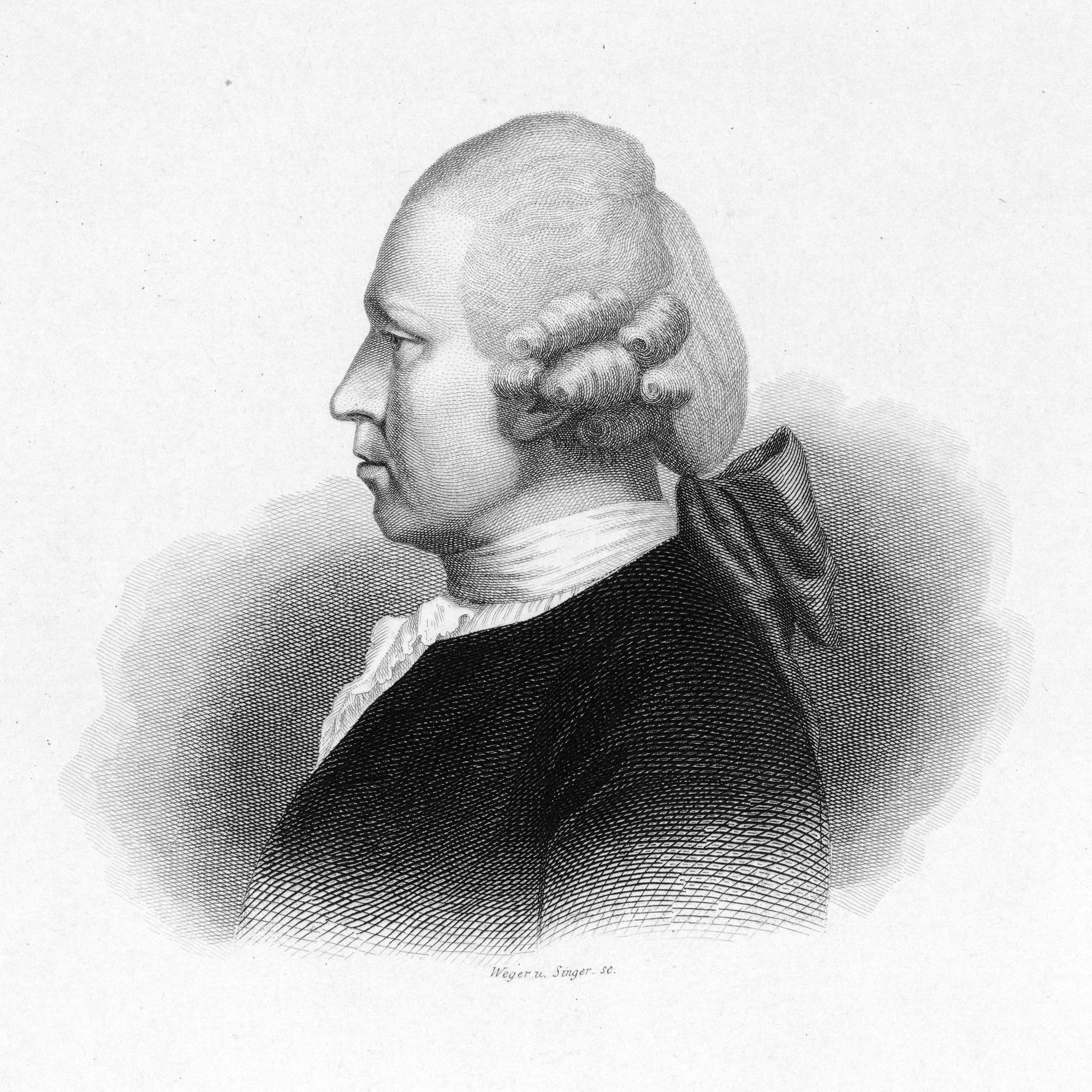
Johann Adam Hiller

Die verwandelten Weiber, oder Der Teufel ist los, erster Teil (The Metamorphosed Wives, or The Devil to Pay, Part 1) is a three-act German: comische Oper by the German composer Johann Adam Hiller, incorporating 14 musical numbers from the popular farce Der Teufel ist los by Johann Georg Standfuß.

The libretto was by Christian Felix Weiße (1726–1804) based on the ballad opera The Devil to Pay, or The Wives Metamorphos'd by Charles Coffey (1731), and an opéra comique text by Michel-Jean Sedaine using the same material.

== Performance history ==
The opera was first performed at the theatre in Quandt's Court, Leipzig on 28 May 1766, conducted by the composer.

== Roles ==
Roles, voice types
Role	Voice type
von Liebreich	tenor
Frau von Liebreich	soprano
Jobsen Zeckel, a cobbler	bass
Lene, Zeckel's wife	soprano
Mikroskop, a magician	bass
