= Singspiel =

Opera genre

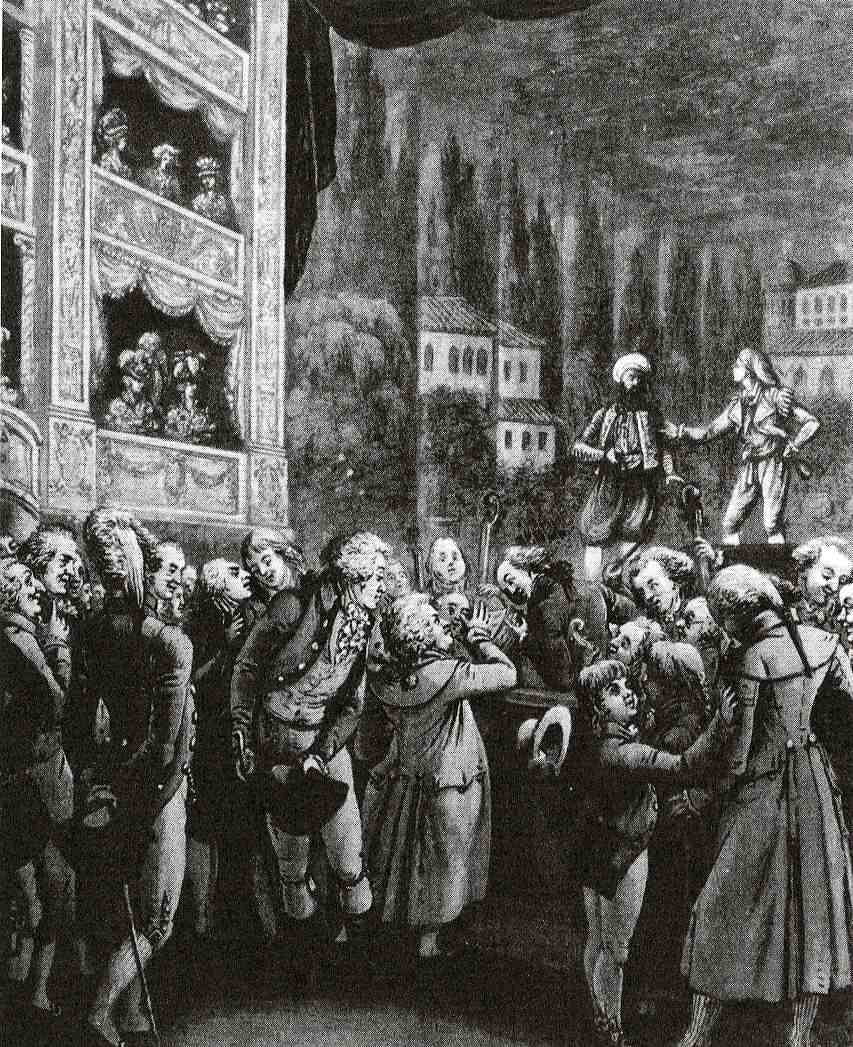
Wolfgang Amadeus Mozart (center) attending a performance of his Singspiel, Die Entführung aus dem Serail, in Berlin in 1789

A Singspiel (German pronunciation: [ˈzɪŋʃpiːl]; plural: Singspiele; lit. 'sing-play') is a form of German-language music drama, now regarded as a genre of opera. It is characterized by spoken dialogue, which is alternated with ensembles, songs, ballads, and arias which were often strophic, or folk-like. Singspiel plots are generally comic or romantic in nature, and frequently include elements of magic, fantastical creatures, and comically exaggerated characterizations of good and evil.

== History ==
Some of the first Singspiele were miracle plays in Germany, where dialogue was interspersed with singing. By the early 17th century, miracle plays had grown profane, the word "Singspiel" is found in print, and secular Singspiele were also being performed, both in translated borrowings or imitations from English and Italian songs and plays, and in original German creations.

In the 18th century, some Singspiele were translations of English ballad operas. In 1736, the Prussian ambassador to England commissioned a translation of the ballad opera The Devil to Pay. This was successfully performed in the 1740s in Hamburg and Leipzig. A further version of this was made by Johann Adam Hiller and C. F. Weiße in 1766 (Der Teufel ist los oder Die verwandelten Weiber), the first of a string of such collaborations which led to Hiller and Weisse being called "the fathers of the German Singspiel."

French operas with spoken dialogue (opéras comiques) were frequently transcribed into German and became very successful in Vienna in the late 1770s and early 1780s. By contrast, German translations of contemporary Italian opere buffe, which were quite successful in England and France at the time, were significantly less frequent. Singspiele were considered middle-to-lower class entertainment – as opposed to the predominantly aristocratic genres of opera, ballet and stage play – and were usually performed by traveling troupes (such as the Koch, Döbbelin and Koberwein companies), rather than by established companies within metropolitan centers.

Mozart wrote several Singspiele: Bastien und Bastienne (1768), Zaide (1780), Die Entführung aus dem Serail (1782), Der Schauspieldirektor (1786), and finally Die Zauberflöte (1791). E. T. A. Hoffmann, who admired him, composed Singspiele, such as Liebe und Eifersucht in 1807.

In 1927, Kurt Weill created a new word, "Songspiel", to describe his work Mahagonny-Songspiel.
