= Variations and Fugue on a Theme by Hiller =

- by Max Reger
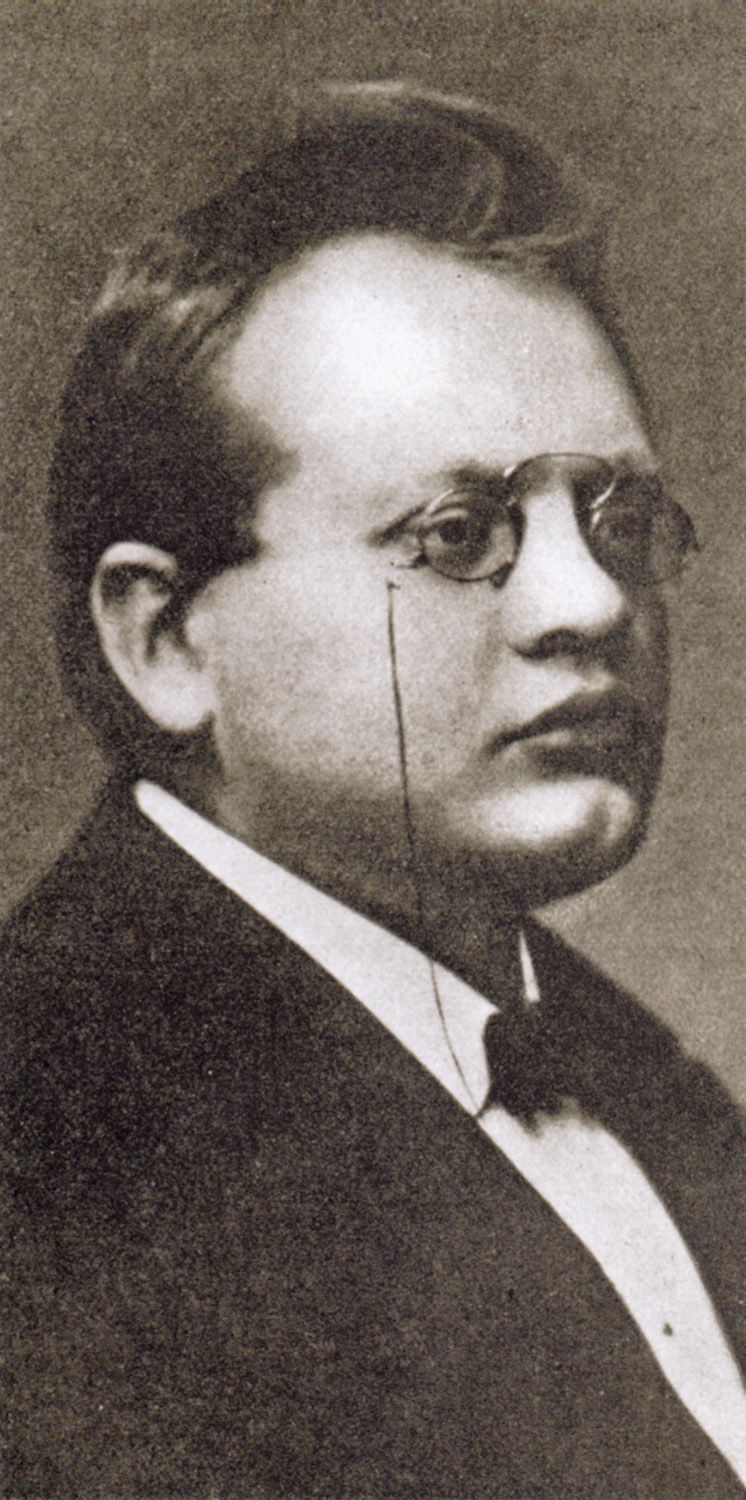
- The composer in 1907
- Key: E major
- Opus: 100
- Composed: April 1907-July 6, 1907
- Performed: 15 October 1907
- Scoring: orchestra

Variations and Fugue on a Theme by Hiller, Op. 100, is a set of variations for orchestra written by the German composer Max Reger in 1907 after he had preconceived the idea by May 1904. They are based on an original melodic line by the 18th-century composer Johann Adam Hiller. Fritz Steinbach conducted the premiere in Cologne, Germany on 15 October 1907. Along with the composer's Mozart Variations, the Hiller Variations are one of his most popular and frequently recorded works.

== History ==
Reger was occupied with the Hiller variations at a fairly tumultuous period of his life. His Sinfonietta in A major, Op. 90, was met with open rejection in Munich, so he postponed the project of the Hiller Variations and initially composed the Serenade in G major, Op. 95, to calm people's minds. He only resumed work on the Hiller Variations after his appointment as university music director and university professor in Leipzig had been confirmed.

== Description ==
The work consists of the initial exposition of Hiller's theme followed by eleven variations and a concluding fugue. Like many of Reger's orchestral works, the piece is heavily Brahmsian in both style and sound, even though there is a lot of Wagnerian chromaticism in some variations (Var. XI). The concluding fugue reveals the composer's enthusiasm for the music of Johann Sebastian Bach.

1. Thema : Andante grazioso
2. Più andante
3. Allegretto con grazia
4. Vivace
5. Poco vivo
6. Andante sostenuto
7. Tempo di minuetto
8. Presto
9. Andante con moto
10. Allegro con spirito
11. Allegro appassionato
12. Andante con moto
13. Fuga : Allegro moderato (ma con spirito)

Writing in 1921, the American critic and musicologist James Huneker noted:

Max Reger pinned his faith to Brahms and absolute music, though not without an individual variation. In considering his Sinfonietta, the Serenade, the Hiller Variations, the Prologue to a Tragedy, the Lustspiel overture, the two concertos respectively for pianoforte and violin, we are struck not so much by the masterly handling of old forms as by the stark, emotional content of these compositions. It is an error to dismiss his music as merely academic. He began as a Brahmsianer, but he did not succeed, as did his master, in fusing form and theme. There is a Dionysian strain in him that too often is in jarring discord with the intellectual structure of his work. The furor teutonicus in conflict with the scholar. Yet at one period Reger was considered the rival of Strauss, though that day has long passed.
