= Won't You Fondle Me =

1904 popular song by James Kendis

"Won't You Fondle Me?"

Song
- Published: 1904
- Composers: James Kendis, James Paley

"Won't You Fondle Me?" is a popular song from 1904, with words and music by James Kendis and James Paley. The serio-comic "flirtation song" was popularized by singer Grace La Rue, and recorded by Billy Murray on Zonophone, Harry Tally on Columbia Records, and Arthur Collins on Edison Records. According to Edison Phonograph Monthly, the song has "somewhat of the rag-time rhythm," and was "very popular among vaudeville singers generally." The song was included in the short-lived 1905 musical comedy How He Won Her.

The chorus of the song was:

Won't you fondle me, won't you fondle me,
Throw your loving arms around me in that loving way,
Tell me that you love me and you're going to stay.
I'll stop flirting too, 'cause it's hurting you,
Keep my heart's affection burning all for you,
If you only fondle me.

The song has been cited as one of the more risque, "sophisticated" songs of the day, along with "In the Naughty Altogether", "Cuddle Up a Little Closer", "You Can Go As Far As You Like With Me in My Merry Oldsmobile", and "Put Your Arms Around Me Honey, Hold Me Tight".
