= On the Warpath =

"On The Warpath"
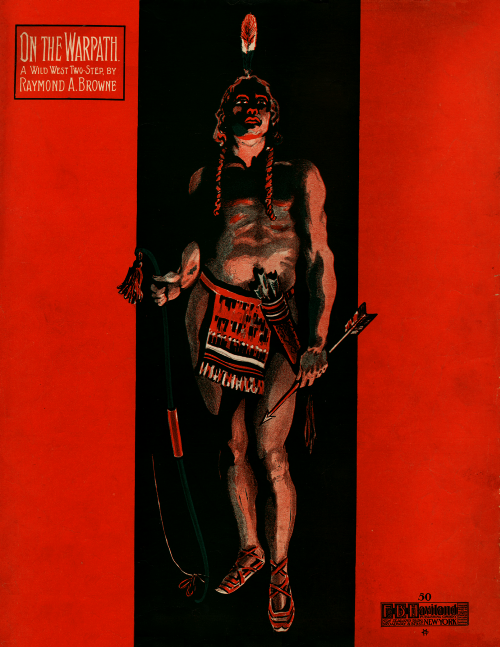
- Sheet music cover

Instrumental
- Written: 1904
- Composer(s): Raymond A. Browne

"On The Warpath" is a popular instrumental tune composed by Raymond A. Browne in 1904. "On The Warpath" was the first American popular music to incorporate a repeating tom-tom effect in the score.

== Bibliography ==
- Browne, Raymond A. "On The Warpath" (Sheet music). New York: F.B. Haviland (1904).
- Pisani, Michael. Imagining Native America in Music. New Haven, CT: Yale University Press (2006).
