= Johann Adam Hiller =

German musical artist (1728–1804)

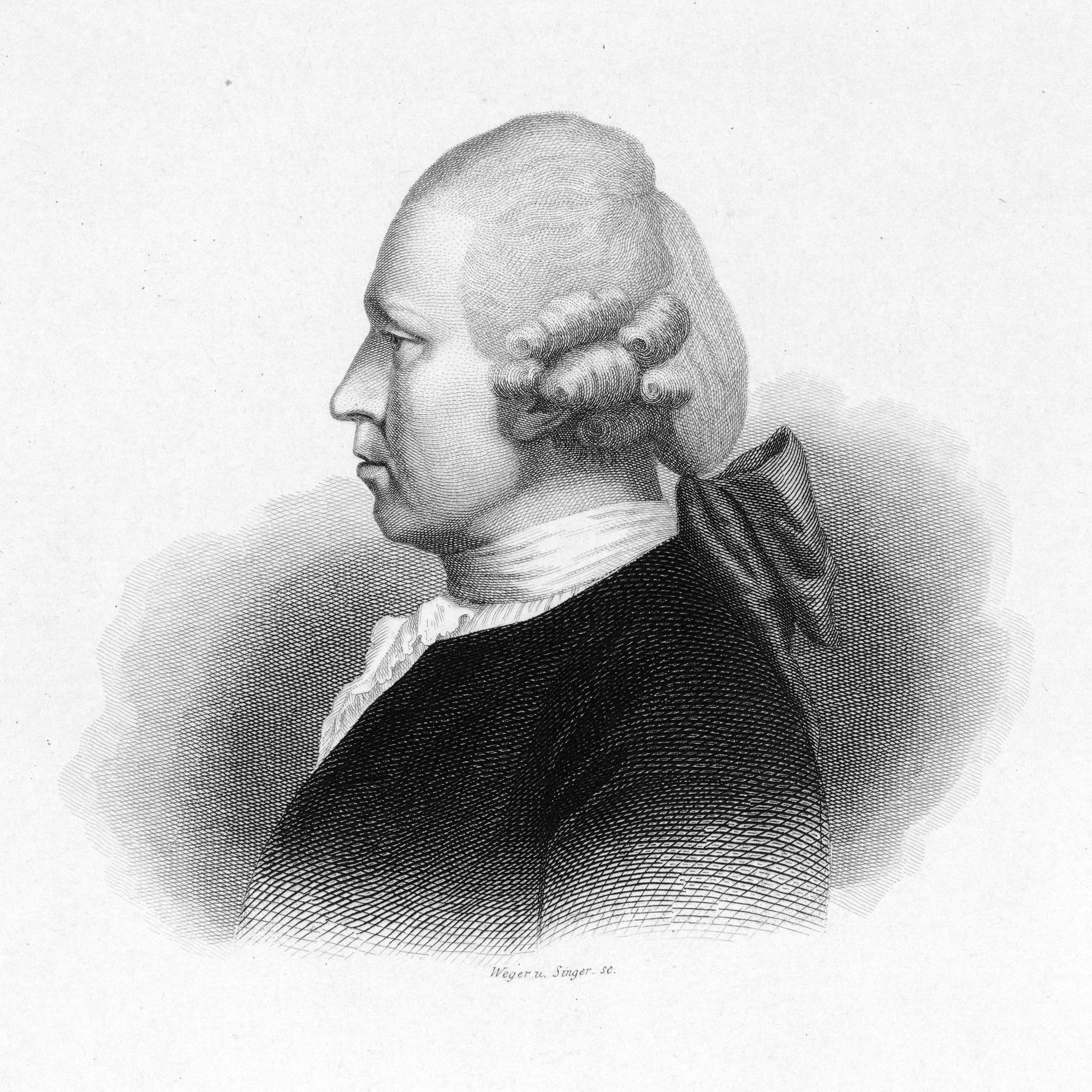
Hiller, c. 1850

Johann Adam Hiller (25 December 1728 – 16 June 1804) was a German composer, conductor and writer on music, regarded as the creator of the Singspiel, an early form of German opera. In many of these operas he collaborated with the poet Christian Felix Weiße.

Hiller was a teacher who encouraged musical education for women, his pupils including Elisabeth Mara and Corona Schröter. He was Kapellmeister of Abel Seyler's theatrical company, and became the first Kapellmeister of the Leipzig Gewandhaus Orchestra.

== Biography ==
By the death of his father in 1734, Hiller was left dependent to a large extent on the charity of friends. He came from a musical family, and also learned the basics of music from a school master in his home town, Wendisch-Ossig. From 1740 to 1745, he was a student at the Gymnasium in Görlitz, where his fine soprano voice earned him free tuition. In 1746 he went to study at the famous Kreuzschule in Dresden. There he took keyboard and basso continuo lessons with Gottfried August Homilius.

In 1751, he enrolled in Leipzig University to study law, supporting himself by giving music lessons, and also by performing at concerts both on the flute and as a singer. Hiller immersed himself in the rich musical life of the town, and gradually adopted music as his sole profession. He took an active role in the Großes Concert, which was the leading concert undertaking in Leipzig. During that time he wrote several symphonies, church cantatas, and arias, as well as a fragmentary Singspiel entitled Das Orackle. Hiller also published an essay on the Mimesis of Nature in Music (Abhandlung über die Nachahmung der Natur in der Musik) in 1754. That year he got his first break when he became steward and tutor to the son of Count Brühl in Dresden. He accompanied the Count to Leipzig in 1758. He remained in that position until 1760 when health problems (depression) forced him to resign. It was during his stay there that he conceived the idea of reviving some subscription concerts, an attempt which ultimately led to the founding of the Leipzig Gewandhaus concerts of which he was the first conductor.

Back in Leipzig, Hiller became the director of the Großes Concert, a position he held until 1771. That year he founded a singing school. Four years later, Hiller founded his own concert society, the Musikübende Gesellschaft. In his Leipzig school, he trained young musicians in singing and playing instruments. Two of his most famous students were Corona Schröter and Gertrud Elisabeth Mara née Schmeling, both acclaimed singers. He also taught organist and composer Daniel Gottlob Türk. In 1778 Hiller was appointed music director at the Paulinerkirche, the church of Leipzig University. During that time he also organized Concerts spirituels for Lent.

To Hiller has been given the credit of being the originator of the Singspiel, the beginning of German comedy opera as distinct from the French and Italian developments. The most important of his operas were: Lottchen am Hofe (Lottie at court, 1760), Der Teufel ist los (The devil is loose, 1768), and Poltis, oder Das gerettete Troja (Poltis, or Troy rescued, 1782). The lyrics of all his Singspiele were of considerable musical value, and were long popular. Among his sacred compositions are: A Passion Cantata, Funeral Music in Honor of Hasse, a setting of the one hundredth Psalm; and a few symphonies.

In the 1780s he acquired new positions with increased alacrity. In 1781 he became conductor of the Gewandhaus concerts. During the same year he visited the court of the Duke of Courland in Mitau, a journey that resulted in Hiller's appointment as Kapellmeister there four years later. In addition to his posts at the Gewandhaus and the Paulinerkirche, in 1783 he also became the music director of the Neukirche which made him a top authority on music in Leipzig. However, when taking up his new job in Mitau in 1785 he resigned all his posts in Leipzig. Due to the unstable political situation at the court of Courland he resigned from his position there after only one year. Since he no longer had any occupation in Leipzig he had to organize concerts to earn his living, but he was able to secure for himself the post of music director of the city of Breslau in 1787. He spent two years in Breslau and returned to Leipzig in 1789 to become cantor at the Thomaskirche, conducting the Thomanerchor, a position filled by Johann Sebastian Bach before. Hiller held the post until 1801 when he resigned due to his age.

In addition, Hiller carried out notable work as an editor and publisher of other composers' output, and wrote considerably concerning musical topics. Indeed, he was one of the most important German musical scholars and writers of the eighteenth century. In 1803 he arranged and edited the score of Mozart's Der Messias, a version of Handel's Messiah. He died at the age of 75 in Leipzig in 1804. He was the father of the composer Friedrich Adam Hiller (c. 1767–1812), but he was not related to the musician Ferdinand Hiller.

== Operas ==
A theme from Hiller's opera Der Aerndtekranz (1771) was the basis for Max Reger's orchestral Variations and Fugue on a Theme by Hiller (1907).

== Literary production ==
Hiller's major contribution in this field include the Wöchentliche Nachrichten, a music journal in which he published reviews of performances, new music publications, and essays on various music related topics. From his articles in this journal it becomes clear that Hiller was open to new trends in music, and that he preferred Hasse over J. S. Bach and Gluck. Writings of Hiller on aesthetic issues include the Abhandlung über die Nachahmung der Natur in der Musik (1754) and Über die Musik und deren Wirkungen (1781), which is a translation from Michel Paul Guy de Chabanon's Observations sur la musique.

As a historian, Hiller published a series of anecdotes and biographies, the Anecdoten zur Lebensgeschichte großer Regenten und berühmter Staatsmänner and Lebensbeschreibungen berühmter Musikgelehrten und Tonkünstler neuerer Zeit and the Lebensbeschreibungen berühmter Musikgelehrten und Tonkünstler neuerer Zeit.

The majority of his writings concern pedagogy. In these publications Hiller presents himself as a highly competent teacher who regarded knowledge of music an essential part of everyone's education.

=== Writings ===
- "Abhandlung über die Nachahmung der Natur in der Musik" in Friedrich Wilhelm Marpurg: Historisch-kritische Beyträge zur Aufnahme der Musik, vol. 1 (Berlin, 1754)
- Anecdoten zur Lebensgeschichte großer Regenten und berühmter Staatsmänner (Leipzig, 1766–72)
- As an editor: Wöchentliche Nachrichten und Anmerkungen die Musik betreffend (Leipzig, 1766–70)
- Anweisung zur Singekunst in der deutschen und italienischen Sprache (Frankfurt and Leipzig, 1773)
- Musikalisches Handbuch für die Liebhaber des Gesanges und Claviers (Leipzig, 1773)
- Anweisung zum musikalisch-richtigen Gesange (Leipzig, 1774, enlarged 1798)
- Exempel-Buch der Anweisung zum Singen (Leipzig, 1774)
- Anweisung zum musikalisch-zierlichen Gesange (Leipzig, 1780)
- Lebensbeschreibungen berühmter Musikgelehrten und Tonkünstler neuerer Zeit (Leipzig, 1784). Includes autobiography.
- Über Metastasio und seine Werke (Leipzig, 1786)
- Nachricht von der Aufführung des Händelschen Messias, in der Domkirche zu Berlin den 19. May 1786(Berlin, 1786)
- Fragmente aus Händels Messias, nebst Betrachtungen über die Aufführung Händelscher Singcompositionen (Leipzig, 1787)
- Über Alt und Neu in der Musik (Leipzig, 1787)
- Was ist wahre Kirchenmusik? (Leipzig, 1789)
- Co-authored with J. A. Hasse: Beyträge zu wahrer Kirchenmusik (Leipzig, 2/1791)
- Kurze und erleichterte Anweisung zum Singen (Leipzig, 1792)
- Anweisung zum Violinspielen für Schulen und zum Selbstunterrichte (Leipzig, 1792)
- Erinnerungen gegen das Melodien-Register in Freyes kleiner Lieder-Konkordanz (Leipzig, 1798)
