= 1922 in music =

This is a list of notable events in music that took place in the year 1922.

== Specific locations ==
- 1922 in British music
- 1922 in Norwegian music

== Specific genres ==
- 1922 in country music
- 1922 in jazz

== Events ==
- January 24 – Carl Nielsen conducts the first public performance of his Symphony No. 5 in Copenhagen.
- May 28 – The Detroit News Orchestra, the world's first radio orchestra (a symphonic ensemble organized specifically to play on radio), begins broadcasting from radio station WWJ in Detroit, Michigan.
- October 11 – Leila Megàne makes the first complete recording of Sir Edward Elgar's Sea Pictures, with Elgar himself conducting.
- October 19 – Maurice Ravel's orchestral arrangement of Modest Mussorgsky's Pictures at an Exhibition is premiered in Paris.
- December 20 – Antigone by Jean Cocteau appears on the stage of the Théâtre de l'Atelier in Paris, with settings by Pablo Picasso, music by Arthur Honegger and costumes by Gabrielle Chanel.
- Louis Armstrong leaves New Orleans for Chicago to join King Oliver's Creole Jazz Band.
- Richard Tauber joins the Vienna State Opera.
- Earliest known example of American gospel song "This Train (is Bound for Glory)", a recording by Florida Normal and Industrial Institute Quartette, under the title "Dis Train".
- The Central Band of the Royal Air Force becomes the first military band to make a radio broadcast with the British Broadcasting Company.
- All musical compositions written in this year or earlier are now public domain in the United States. Recordings of those compositions, however are still protected by various state statutes and do not fully enter the nationwide public domain until February 15, 2067.

== Publications ==
- Busoni, Ferruccio (1922). Von der Einheit der Musik, von Dritteltönen und junger Klassizität, von Bühnen und Bauten und anschliessenden Bezirken. Berlin: M. Hesse.
- Stanford, Charles Villiers (1922). Interludes, Records and Reflections. New York: E. P. Dutton and Company.

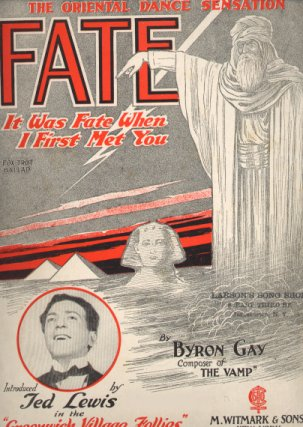
Sheet music cover of "Fate" featuring a photo of jazz band leader Ted Lewis.

== Published popular music ==
- "Aggravatin' Papa" w.m. Roy Turk, J. Russel Robinson & Addy Britt
- "All Over Nothing At All" w. J. Keirn Brennan & Paul Cunningham m. James Rule
- "Along The Road To Gundagai" w.m. Jack O'Hagan
- "L'Amour. Toujours L'Amour (Love Everlasting)" w.(Eng) Catherine Chisholm Cushing m. Rudolf Friml
- "Angel Child" w. Georgie Price & Benny Davis m. Abner Silver
- "Baby Blue Eyes" w.m. Jesse Greer, Walter Hirsch & George Jessel
- "Bee's Knees" by Leo Wood & Ray Lopez
- "Blue (And Broken Hearted)" w. Grant Clarke & Edgar Leslie m. Lou Handman
- "Broken Hearted Melody" w. Gus Kahn m. Isham Jones
- "A Brown Bird Singing" w. Royden Barrie m. Haydn Wood
- "Bugle Call Rag" m. Jack Pettis, Billy Meyers & Elmer Schoebel
- "Carolina in the Morning" w. Gus Kahn m. Walter Donaldson
- "Carolina Shout" m. James P. Johnson
- "Chicago" w.m. Fred Fisher
- "China Boy" w.m. Dick Winfree & Phil Boutelje
- "Crinoline Days" w.m. Irving Berlin
- "Dancing Fool" w. Harry B. Smith & Francis Wheeler m. Ted Snyder
- "Dearest (You're The Nearest To My Heart)" w. Benny Davis m. Harry Akst
- "Do It Again" w. B. G. De Sylva m. George Gershwin
- "Down In Midnight Town" w. Andrew B. Sterling & Edward P. Moran m. Harry Von Tilzer
- "Down Hearted Blues" w. Alberta Hunter m Lovie Austin
- "Dream On" (An Indian Lullaby) w. B.G DeSylva, m. Victor Herbert
- "Dreamy Melody" w.m. Ted Koehler, Frank Magine & C. Naset
- "Farewell Blues" w.m. Paul Joseph Mares, Leon Rappolo & Elmer Schoebel
- "Fate" by Byron Gay
- "Georgette" w. Lew Brown m. Ray Henderson
- "Georgia" w. Howard Johnson m. Walter Donaldson
- "Heute spielt der Uridil" w.m. Oskar Virag & Oskar Steiner
- "I Found A Four Leaf Clover" w. B. G. De Sylva m. George Gershwin
- "I Gave You Up Just Before You Threw Me Down" w. Bert Kalmar m. Harry Ruby & Fred E. Ahlert
- "I'll Build a Stairway to Paradise" w. B. G. De Sylva & Ira Gershwin m. George Gershwin
- "I'm going Back to Yarrawonga"
- "A Kiss In The Dark" w. B. G. De Sylva m. Victor Herbert
- "Kitten on the Keys" m. Zez Confrey
- "The Lady In Ermine" w. Cyrus Wood m. Al Goodman
- "Lady Of The Evening" w.m. Irving Berlin. Introduced by John Steel in the Music Box Revue of 1922.
- "Limehouse Blues" w. Douglas Furber m. Philip Braham
- "Los mareados w. Enrique Cadícamo m. Juan Carlos Cobián
- "Lovesick Blues" w. Irving Mills m. Cliff Friend
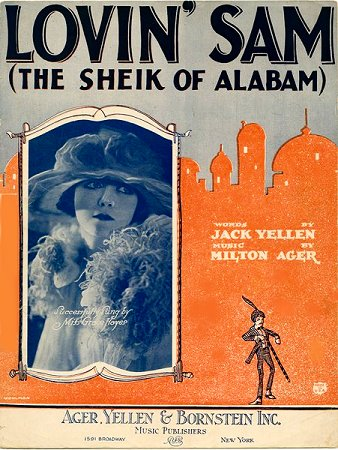
- "Lovin' Sam (The Sheik Of Alabam)" w. Jack Yellen m. Milton Ager
- "March With Me!" w. Douglas Furber m. Ivor Novello
- "Mister Gallagher and Mister Shean" w.m. Ed Gallagher & Al Shean
- "My Buddy" w. Gus Kahn m. Walter Donaldson
- "My Rambler Rose" w. Gene Buck m. Louis A. Hirsch & Dave Stamper
- "My Sweet Hortense" w. Joe Young & Sam Lewis m. Walter Donaldson
- "My Word You Do Look Queer" w.m. R. P. Weston & Bert Lee
- "'Neath The South Sea Moon" w. Gene Buck m. Louis A. Hirsch & Dave Stamper
- "Nellie Kelly I Love You" w.m. George M. Cohan
- "Nuits de Chine" w. Ernest Dumont m. Louis Bénech
- "On the Alamo" w. Gus Kahn m. Isham Jones
- "On The Gin Gin Ginny Shore" w. Edgar Leslie m. Walter Donaldson
- "Oo-oo Ernest Are You Earnest With Me" w. Sidney Clare & Harry Tobias m. Cliff Friend
- "Pack Up Your Sins And Go To The Devil" w.m. Irving Berlin
- "Rose Of The Rio Grande" w. Edgar Leslie m. Harry Warren & Ross Gorman
- "Round On The End And High In The Middle (O-Hi-O)" w.m. Alfred Bryan & Bert Hanlon
- "Runnin' Wild" w. Joe Grey & Leo Wood m. A. Harrington Gibbs
- "Say It While Dancing" w. Benny Davis m. Abner Silver
- "Shabondama" w. Ujō Noguchi
- "'Taint Nobody's Business If I Do" w.m. Clarence Williams, Porter Grainger & Graham Prince
- "Three O'Clock in the Morning" w. Dorothy Terriss m. Julián Robledo
- "Throw Me A Kiss" w. Gene Buck m. Louis A. Hirsch & Dave Stamper
- "Toot, Toot, Tootsie (Goo' Bye!)" w.m. Dan Russo, Ted Fio Rito, Gus Kahn & Ernie Erdman
- "Trees" w. Joyce Kilmer m. Oscar Rasbach
- "Tu verras Montmartre!" w. Lucien Boyer m. Charles Borel-Clerc
- "'Way Down Yonder In New Orleans" w. Henry Creamer m. Turner Layton
  - "When Hearts Are Young" w. Cyrus Wood m. Sigmund Romberg & Al Goodman
- "When You And I Were Young, Maggie, Blues" w.m. Jack Frost & Jimmy McHugh
- "Who Cares?" w. Jack Yellen m. Milton Ager
- "Wonderful One" w. Dorothy Terris m. Paul Whiteman & Ferde Grofe
- "You Know You Belong To Somebody Else" w. Eugene West m. James V. Monaco
- "You Remind Me Of My Mother" w.m. George M. Cohan
- "You Tell Her, I S-t-u-t-t-e-r" w. Billy Rose m. Cliff Friend

== Top Popular Recordings 1922 ==
The following songs achieved the highest positions in Joel Whitburn's Pop Memories 1890-1954 and record sales reported on the "Discography of American Historical Recordings" website during 1922: Numerical rankings are approximate, they are only used as a frame of reference.

Rank	Artist	Title	Label	Recorded	Released	Chart Positions
1	Al Jolson	"April Showers"	Columbia 3500	October 21, 1921	December 1921	US Billboard 1922 #1, US #1 for 11 weeks, 17 total weeks, 1,000,000 sales
2	Paul Whiteman and His Orchestra	"Three O'Clock in the Morning"	Victor 18940	August 21, 1922	November 1922	US Billboard 1922 #2, US #1 for 8 weeks, 20 total weeks, 1,732,034 sold (Victor 1920s memo), 3.5 million
3	Ed Gallagher and Al Shean	"Mister Gallagher and Mister Shean"	Victor 18941	July 21, 1922	October 1922	US Billboard 1922 #3, US #1 for 6 weeks, 12 total weeks, 929,185 sold (Victor 1920s memo)
4	Paul Whiteman and His Orchestra	"Stumbling"	Victor 18899	August 23, 1922	November 1922	US Billboard 1922 #4, US #1 for 6 weeks, 12 total weeks
5	Paul Whiteman and His Orchestra	"Hot Lips"	Victor 18920	March 30, 1922	September 1922	US Billboard 1922 #5, US #1 for 6 weeks, 11 total weeks, 523,106 sold (Victor 1920s memo), 1,000,000 sold
6	Al Jolson	"Angel Child"	Columbia 3568	January 17, 1922	May 1922	US Billboard 1922 #6, US #1 for 5 weeks, 8 total weeks
7	Isham Jones Orchestra	"On the Alamo"	Brunswick 2245	February 15, 1922	May 1922	US Billboard 1922 #7, US #1 for 4 weeks, 10 total weeks
8	Billy Jones & Ernie Hare	"Mister Gallagher and Mister Shean"	Okeh 4608	April 15, 1922	July 1922	US Billboard 1922 #8, US #1 for 2 weeks, 9 total weeks
9	Paul Whiteman and His Orchestra	"Do it Again"	Victor 18882	June 23, 1922	July 1922	US Billboard 1922 #9, US #1 for 2 weeks, 9 total weeks, 523,206 sold (Victor 1920s memo)
10	Henry Burr	"My Buddy"	Victor 18930	July 13, 1922	October 1922	US Billboard 1922 #10, US #1 for 1 weeks, 10 total weeks
11	Fanny Brice (Orchestra conducted by Rosario Bourdon)	"My Man"	Victor 45263	November 15, 1921	February 1922	US Billboard 1922 #11, US #1 for 1 weeks, 9 total weeks, 424,849 sold (Victor 1920s memo)
12	Al Jolson	"Give Me My Mammy"	Columbia 3540	October 22, 1921	April 1922	US Billboard 1922 #12, US #2 for 4 weeks, 8 total weeks
18	Vernon Dalhart and the Criterion Trio	"Tuck Me to Sleep (In My Old 'Tucky Home)"	Victor 18807	September 1, 1921	November 1921	US Billboard 1922 #18, US #2 for 1 weeks, 7 total weeks, 1,040,811 sold (Victor 1920s memo)
19	Isham Jones Orchestra	"The World Is Waiting for the Sunrise"	Brunswick 2313	July 1, 1922	October 1922	US Billboard 1922 #19, US #2 for 1 weeks, 6 total weeks

== Classical music ==
- Kurt Atterberg – Cello Concerto
- Alfredo Barbirolli – Sensuel-tango
- Arnold Bax – First Symphony
- Arthur Bliss – A Colour Symphony
- Julián Carrillo – Preludio a Colón, for soprano in fifths of a tone, flute, violin, and guitar in quarter tones, octavina in eighth tones, and harp in sixteenth tones
- Gerald Finzi – By Footpath and Stile, Op. 2
- Vittorio Giannini – Stabat Mater
- Hamilton Harty – Piano Concerto
- Paul Hindemith – String Quartet No. 3 in C, Op. 22
- Jacques Ibert
  - Escales, for orchestra
  - Histoires, for piano
- Manuel Infante – Sevillana "Impresiones de fiesta en Sevilla"
- Manuel Jovés (es)– Patotero sentimental
- Ernesto Nazareth
  - "1922" (tango)
  - "Desengonçado"
  - "Fóra dos eixos"
  - "Gaúcho"
  - "Jangadeiro"
  - "Mandinga"
  - "Meigo"
  - "O futurista"
  - "Por que sofre?..."
- Carl Nielsen
  - Fynsk Foraar
  - Wind Quintet
- Francis Poulenc – Sonata for horn, trumpet and trombone (subsequently revised)
- Dmitri Shostakovich
  - Three Fantastic Dances, Op. 5, for piano
  - Suite in F-sharp minor, Op. 6, for two pianos
- Vaughan Williams – Pastoral Symphony
- William Walton – Façade (subsequently revised)

== Opera ==
- Jean Cras – Polyphème
- Paul Hindemith – Sancta Susanna
- Léo Manuel – Le fakir de Bénarès
- Jules Massenet – Amadis
- Ottorino Respighi – La bella dormente nel bosco
- Igor Stravinsky – Mavra
- Alexander Zemlinsky – Der Zwerg

== Film ==
- Hans Erdmann – Nosferatu: A Symphony of Horror

== Musical theater ==
- The Cabaret Girl (Music: Jerome Kern, Book and Lyrics: P. G. Wodehouse and George Grossmith, Jr.) London production opened at the Winter Garden Theatre on September 19 and ran for 361 performances
- The Hotel Mouse Broadway production opened at the Shubert Theatre on March 13 and ran for 88 performances
- Little Nellie Kelly Broadway production opened at the Liberty Theatre on November 13 and ran for 276 performances
- Make It Snappy Broadway revue opened at the Winter Garden Theatre on April 13 and ran for 96 performances. Starring Eddie Cantor, Lew Hearn, J. Harold Murray, Nan Halperin, Georgie Hale and Tot Qualters.
- The Music Box Revue of 1922 opened at the Music Box Theatre on October 23 and ran for 330 performances
- Orange Blossoms (music Victor Herbert) opened at the Fulton Theatre on September 19 and ran for 95 performances
- Phi-Phi London production opened at the Pavilion Theatre on August 16 and ran for 132 performances
- Queen O' Hearts Broadway production opened at the Cohan Theatre on October 10 and ran for 40 performances
- Whirled into Happiness London production opened at the Lyric Theatre on May 18 and ran for 246 performances

== Births ==
- January 3 – Siegmund Nissel, Austrian-born British violinist (d. 2008)
- January 4 – Frank Wess, American saxophonist and flute player (d. 2013)
- January 7 – Jean-Pierre Rampal, French flautist (d. 2000)
- January 16 – Ernesto Bonino, Italian singer (d. 2008)
- January 28 – Anna Gordy Gaye, American songwriter and producer, co-founder of Anna Records (d. 2014)
- February 1 – Renata Tebaldi, operatic soprano (d. 2004)
- February 16 – Geraint Evans, operatic baritone (d. 1992)
- February 17 – Tommy Edwards, singer (d. 1969)
- February 19 – Fredell Lack, American violinist (d. 2017)
- February 23 – Johnny Franz, English record producer (d. 1977)
- March 28 – Felice Chiusano, Italian singer (Quartetto Cetra) (d. 1990)
- April 3 – Doris Day, actress and singer (d. 2019)
- April 4 – Elmer Bernstein, film composer (d. 2004)
- April 5 – Gale Storm, singer and actress (d. 2009)
- April 7 – Mongo Santamaría, percussionist (d. 2003)
- April 14 – Ali Akbar Khan, Indian sarod player (d. 2009)
- April 18 – Lord Kitchener, calypsonian (d. 2000)
- April 22 – Charles Mingus, jazz musician (d. 1979)
- April 29 – Toots Thielemans, Belgian musician (d. 2016)
- May 18 – Kai Winding, Danish-born jazz musician (d. 1983)
- May 25 – Kitty Kallen, American singer (d. 2016)
- May 29 – Iannis Xenakis, composer (d. 2001)
- June 1 – Bibi Ferreira, Brazilian singer and actress (d. 2019)
- June 10 – Judy Garland, American singer and actress (d. 1969)
- June 12 – Leif Thybo, Danish composer and organist (d. 2001)
- June 17 – Jerry Fielding, American radio, film and television composer, arranger, conductor and musical director (d. 1980)
- June 23 – Francis Thorne, American composer (d. 2017)
- June 24 – Tata Giacobetti, Italian singer and lyricist (Quartetto Cetra) (d. 1988)
- June 27 – George Walker, African American classical composer (d. 2018)
- July 4 – Phyllis Kinney, American-born Welsh singer and folk music historian (d. 2026)
- July 9 – Peter Schidlof, Austrian-born British violist (d. 1987)
- July 14 – Bill Millin, Canadian-born Scottish piper (d. 2010)
- August 11 – Ron Grainer, television composer (d. 1981)
- August 13 – T. K. Murthy, Indian mridangam player
- September 3 – Salli Terri, singer and songwriter (d. 1996)
- September 13 – Yma Sumac, Peruvian singer (d. 2008)
- September 16 – Janis Paige, American singer and actress (d. 2024)
- September 18 – Ray Steadman-Allen, English composer for Salvation Army bands (d. 2014)
- September 20 – William Kapell, American pianist (d. 1953)
- October 4 – Dudley Simpson, Australian composer and conductor (d. 2017)
- October 17 – Luiz Bonfá, guitarist and composer (d. 2001)
- November 15 – Doreen Carwithen, composer (d. 2003)
- December 26 – Harry Choates, American Cajun fiddler (d. 1951)

== Deaths ==
- January 26 – Luigi Denza, composer (b. 1846)
- February 14 – William E. Wheelock, piano maker (b. 1852)
- March 4 – Bert Williams, star of the Ziegfeld Follies (b. 1875; pneumonia)
- March 10 – Hans Sitt, violinist and composer (b. 1850)
- March 15 – Ika Peyron, pianist and composer (b. 1845)
- March 22 – Nikolay Sokolov, composer (b. 1859)
- April 12 – František Ondříček, violinist and composer (b. 1857)
- April 18 – Percy Hilder Miles, violinist, composer and teacher (b. 1878; pneumonia)
- April 21 – Alessandro Moreschi, the last known castrato singer of the Vatican.(b. 1858; pneumonia)
- April 29 – Kyrylo Stetsenko, conductor and composer (b. 1882; typhus)
- May 2 – Ada Jones, US singer (b. 1873; kidney failure)
- May 7 – Max Wagenknecht, composer for organ and piano (b. 1857)
- May 15 – Harry Williams songwriter and music publisher (b. 1879)
- May 18 – Eugenia Burzio, Italian operatic soprano (b. 1872; kidney failure)
- May 22 – Carl Teike, composer (b. 1864)
- May 31 – Rutland Barrington, baritone of the D'Oyly Carte Opera Company (b. 1873)
- June 5 – Lillian Russell, US singer and actress (b. 1860)
- June 20 – Vittorio Monti, composer (b. 1868)
- July 24 – George Thorne, baritone of the D'Oyly Carte Opera Company (b. 1856)
- August 5 – William Seidel, Band instrument manufacturer (b. 1848; suicide)
- August 13 – Tom Turpin, ragtime composer (b. 1871; peritonitis)
- August 18 – Dame Genevieve Ward, soprano (b. 1837; heart disease)
- August 19 – Felipe Pedrell, composer (b. 1841)
- August 22 – Sofia Scalchi, operatic contralto (b. 1850)
- October 7 – Marie Lloyd, British music-hall singer (b. 1870; heart and kidney failure)
- October 27 – Rita Fornia, US operatic soprano (b. 1878)
- November 6 – William Baines, English composer and pianist (b. 1899)
- November 14 – Karl Michael Ziehrer, composer and bandmaster (b. 1843; stroke)
- December 18 – Marie Goetze, contralto (b. 1865)
- December 30 – Richard Zeckwer, composer and music teacher (b. 1850)
- date unknown – George H. Diamond, entertainer and songwriter (b. 1862; illness)
