= 1922 in British music =

This is a summary of 1922 in music in the United Kingdom.

== Events ==
- February – The British National Opera Company gives its first performance, at Bradford.
- April – While appearing in The Cosmopolitan Girl at the Gateshead Empire, Cardiff, Marie Lloyd collapses in her dressing room.
- October – The Leeds Festival takes place, with King George V of the United Kingdom as patron.
- 11 October – Leila Megàne and Sir Edward Elgar make the first complete recording of Sea Pictures, with the composer himself conducting.
- 11 October – Composer Walford Davies is knighted in prime minister David Lloyd George's resignation honours.
- date unknown
  - 21-year-old violinist Paul Beard becomes leader of the City of Birmingham Orchestra.
  - Conductor Landon Ronald is knighted.

== Popular music ==
- "March With Me!" w. Douglas Furber m. Ivor Novello
- "The Laughing Policeman" w. Billie Grey, m. George W. Johnson

== Classical music: new works ==
- Arnold Bax – The Happy Forest (orchestral version)
- Arthur Bliss – A Colour Symphony
- Eric Coates – Joyous Youth, orchestral suite
- Edward German – The Willow Song
- Hamilton Harty – Piano Concerto
- William Walton – Façade (subsequently revised)
- Peter Warlock – The Curlew, song cycle based on works by W. B. Yeats

== Musical theatre ==
- 18 May – Whirled into Happiness, with music by Robert Stolz, and book and lyrics by Harry Graham, opens at the Lyric Theatre where it would run for 246 performances, closing on 16 December of the same year. It stars Billy Merson.

== Births ==
- 3 January – Ronald Smith, pianist, composer and teacher (died 2004)
- 7 January – Eric Jupp, English-Australian pianist, composer, and conductor (died 2003)
- 16 February – Sir Geraint Evans, operatic baritone (died 1992)
- February 23 – Johnny Franz, English record producer (died 1977)
- 1 March – Michael Flanders, actor and songwriter (died 1975)
- 9 April – Arthur Tolcher, harmonica player (died 1987)
- 6 June – Iain Hamilton, composer (died 2000)
- 15 June – John Veale, English composer and educator (died 2006)
- 11 August – Ron Grainer, television composer (died 1981)
- 18 September – Ray Steadman-Allen, composer for Salvation Army bands (died 2014)
- 16 October – Max Bygraves, singer and entertainer (died 2012)
- 24 November – Joan Turner, singer and comedian (died 2009)

== Deaths ==
- 18 April – Percy Hilder Miles, composer, conductor and violinist, 43
- 31 May – Rutland Barrington, baritone of the D'Oyly Carte Opera Company, 69
- 24 July – George Thorne, baritone of the D'Oyly Carte Opera Company, 66
- 18 August – Dame Genevieve Ward, soprano, 85
- 22 September – Sir Charles Santley, baritone, 88
- 7 October – Marie Lloyd, British music-hall singer, 52
- date unknown – Charles Macintosh, folk music composer and performer and mycologist, 82

== See also ==
- 1922 in the United Kingdom
