= Winnie Melville =

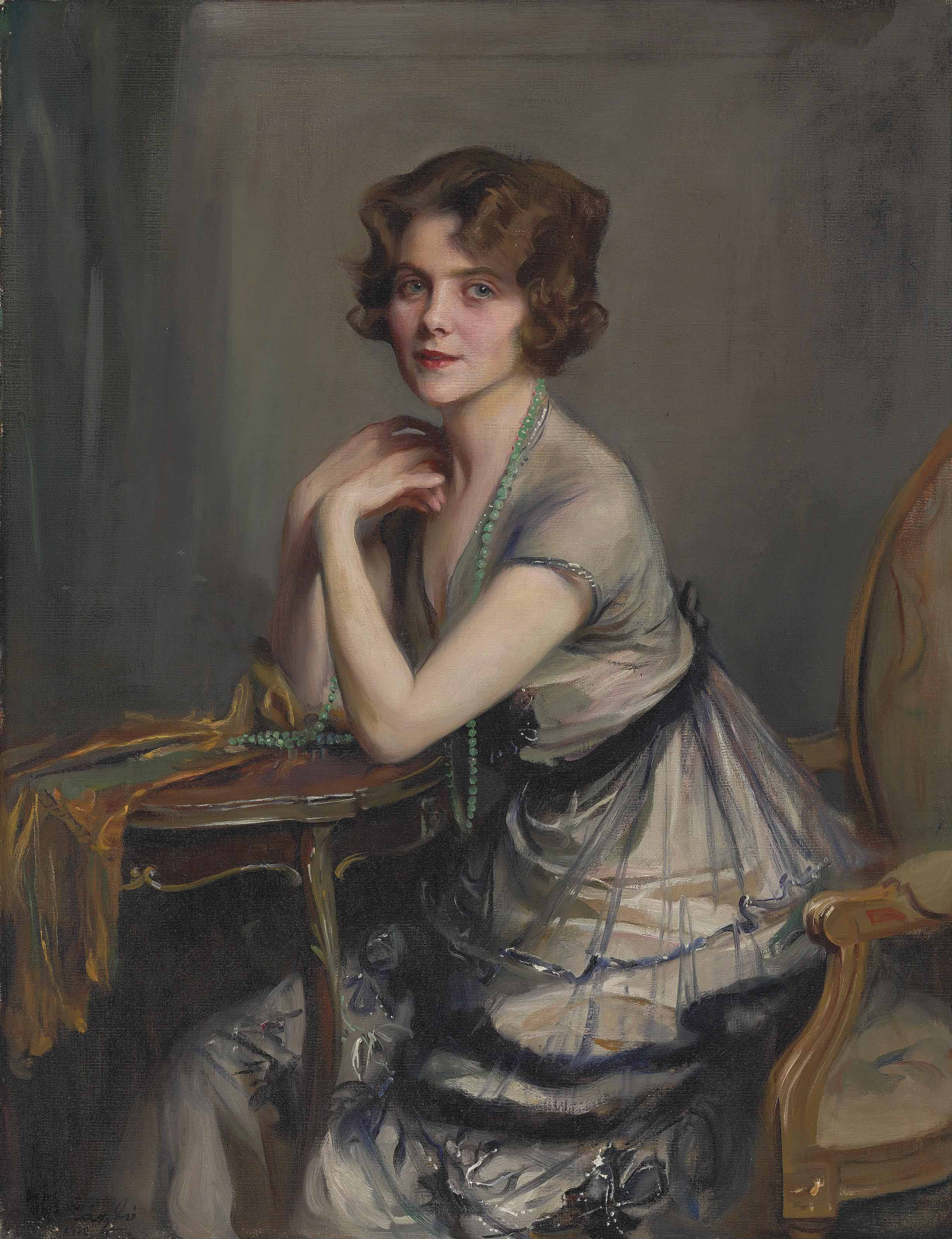
Melville in 1920 by Philip de László

Winifred Camilla Oldham, née Challis, professionally known as Winnie Melville (1895 – 19 September 1937) was an English actress and singer. After an early career as a concert singer she moved into musical comedy, revue and operetta, with a brief spell in Gilbert and Sullivan operas with the D'Oyly Carte Opera Company. She married the tenor Derek Oldham with whom she performed frequently between 1922 and 1932, but their marriage ended in separation in 1933. Among the musicals and operettas in which she starred were Whirled into Happiness (1922), The Student Prince (1926), Princess Charming (1926) and The Vagabond King (1927).

After the break with Oldham, Melville's career halted, and she died in reduced circumstances in 1937 at the age of 42.

== Life and career ==
=== Early years ===
Winifred Camilla Challis was born in London in 1895. After winning a singing competition at the age of sixteen she became a concert performer. The impresario André Charlot saw her perform and cast her in his West End show See-Saw, in which she was given three songs to sing. She made her theatrical début in the show in December 1916 – under the stage name Winnie Melville – at the Comedy Theatre, London, in a cast headed by Jack Hulbert and Ruby Miller, with Phyllis Monkman.

In See-Saw (centre stage) with chorus

Charlot re-engaged her for his next show, Bubbles, the following year. She then appeared in Paris in Albert de Courville's revue Zig-Zag at the Folies Bergère. Returning to England, Melville appeared for de Courville at the Hippodrome in Joy Bells in 1919. Still with de Courville, she appeared in his 1920 show Jig-Saw, with the Dolly Sisters and Laddie Cliff, winning praise for her dancing.

After touring in Sybil, a musical comedy by Harry Graham and Victor Jacobi, she returned to London, appearing at His Majesty's in Cairo by Oscar Asche and Percy Fletcher, and in August 1922 at the Lyric she took over the lead of Whirled into Happiness, a "musical farce" by Graham, Robert Stolz and Robert Bodanzky. The male lead was played by Derek Oldham, who had joined the production after three years as the principal tenor of the D'Oyly Carte Opera Company. Melville and Oldham were married at St Margaret's, Westminster on 9 August 1923, after which she retired from the stage for three years.

=== Return to the stage ===
Melville returned to the stage in 1926 as Kathie in the operetta The Student Prince at His Majesty's. Later in that year she was seen in the title role of Princess Charming at the Palace Theatre; the circumstances in which she left the cast remain unclear. Her performance won excellent notices: The Daily News called her "extraordinarily winsome with the most alluring of smiles and dark eyes that live with expression, mischievous or appealing, gay or sad" and added, "In addition, Miss Melville sings most delightfully". The Manchester Evening News called her:

pre-ordained for the role of Princess Elaine. She is the essence of romance, breathing something incarnate in her very presence. A voice of rich sweetness, a personality which while never thrusting itself forward is sensed, and a delightful ability to throw herself heart and soul into her work.

But the producers decided after three months that Evelyn Laye would be a greater draw to the theatregoing public. It was put about – falsely, according to Melville – that she was going on holiday with Oldham as his engagement in Rose-Marie had just finished. The producers were contractually obliged to keep paying her salary for the duration of the run, but she found the professional slight hurtful.

As Katherine de Vaucelles in The Vagabond King, 1927

In April 1927 Melville starred as Katherine de Vaucelles in another operetta, The Vagabond King, opposite Oldham in the role of François Villon at the Winter Garden Theatre. The Era said of their performances, "Mr Derek Oldham gave an engaging performance as François Villon .... Miss Winnie Melville was delightful, vocally and in character, as Katherine. The singing of these two, solo and duo, was greatly enjoyed". The production ran in the West End for 480 performances. In 1928 the couple appeared in music hall in songs and duets at the London Coliseum. Their last musical comedy together was Winona (1929), which had what was intended to be a pre-London tour but did not make it into the West End. The show, produced by Russell Janney, was called The White Eagle on Broadway, but the composer, Rudolf Friml, was so taken with Melville's performance in the initial auditions that he wrote a new song, "Winona", for her and the show was retitled.

When the D'Oyly Carte company played a 22-week London season at the Savoy Theatre from October 1929 to March 1930 Oldham rejoined for the season. Melville joined him, playing six of the principal soprano roles. (Note: Josephine in H.M.S Pinafore, Mabel in The Pirates of Penzance, Yum-Yum in The Mikado, Rose Maybud in Ruddigore, Elsie in The Yeomen of the Guard and Gianetta in The Gondoliers in all but one of which she ended the opera paired off with Oldham's character.) Her notices were excellent: The Times said of her in The Mikado, "Miss Winnie Melville has the very part for her arch graces in Yum-Yum and sings "The Sun and I" with dainty charm", and The Daily Telegraph said that as Elsie in The Yeomen of the Guard she "looked extremely pretty ... her voice has so much of freshness and charm". Nonetheless, a historian of the D'Oyly Carte Company suggests that Gilbert and Sullivan was not her ideal milieu and she felt somewhat out of her element. Oldham rejoined the company in 1935–1937, but Melville never returned.

=== Last years ===
Melville and Oldham toured in a short operetta, For Ever After, as part of a music hall programme, and sang together in other music hall programmes and in ad hoc concerts. They were still performing together in early 1932, but in that year the couple split up. The High Court awarded Oldham a judicial separation from Melville in July 1933. He told the court that she had committed "various acts of cruelty and violence to him between October 1923 and 1932" and he had left her for fear of further violence. A counter-suit by Melville went unheard because, against legal advice, she absented herself before the trial to take up an offer from Janney to star in New York. The offer came to nothing. Back in England she told a journalist:

I knew on the second day of our marriage it had been a ghastly mistake ... it has been nine long years of sham and pretence. Everyone, except my most intimate friends, thought we were what we appeared to be, lovers on the stage, lovers in real life.

After four years with little work Melville was bankrupt and dependent on aid from the Actors' Benevolent Fund. She made two attempted come-backs in Worthing, and was planning further attempts until the day of her death. In mid-1937 she had a fall in Ramsgate and had to be taken to hospital. She returned to her London home in Paddington where she remained unwell. She died in the nearby St Mary's Hospital, Paddington, on 19 September 1937 aged 42. An inquest found that she died from a sub-dural haemorrhage caused by a fall, exacerbated by cirrhosis of the liver due to alcoholism.

== Notes, references and sources ==
=== Sources ===
- Joseph, Tony (1994). The D'Oyly Carte Opera Company, 1875–1982: An Unofficial History. London: Bunthorne Books. ISBN 0-9507992-1-1
- Parker, John, ed. (1939). Who's Who in the Theatre (ninth ed.). London: Sir Isaac Pitman and Sons. OCLC 473894893.
- Parker, John; Freda Gaye; Ian Herbert, eds. (1978). Who Was Who in the Theatre. Detroit: Gale Research. OCLC 310466458.
- Rollins, Cyril; R. John Witts (1962). The D'Oyly Carte Opera Company in Gilbert and Sullivan Operas: A Record of Productions, 1875–1961. London: Michael Joseph. OCLC 504581419.
- Wearing, J. P. (2014). The London Stage, 1920–1929: A Calendar of Productions, Performers, and Personnel (second ed.). London: Bloomsbury. ISBN 978-0-81-089302-3.
