= Hodie =

Cantata by Ralph Vaughan Williams

- Cantata by Ralph Vaughan Williams
- The composer in 1920
- Occasion: Christmas
- Language: Latin; English
- Composed: 1953–1954
- Dedication: Herbert Howells
- Performed: 8 September 1954
- Movements: 16
- Scoring: soprano; tenor; baritone; boys' choir; mixed choir; orchestra

Hodie (This Day) is a cantata by Ralph Vaughan Williams. Composed between 1953 and 1954, it is the composer's last major choral-orchestral composition, and was premiered under his baton at Worcester Cathedral, as part of the Three Choirs Festival, on 8 September 1954. The piece is dedicated to Herbert Howells. The cantata, in 16 movements, is scored for chorus, boys' choir, organ and orchestra, and features tenor, baritone, and soprano soloists.

== Style ==
Stylistically, Hodie represents a synthesis of Vaughan Williams' entire artistic career, with elements drawn from most periods of his creativity. He had already experimented with the form, of Biblical texts interwoven with poetry, in his cantata Dona nobis pacem. Musically, various movements may suggest different earlier works: for example, the accompaniment to the "Hymn" is very similar to the Sinfonia antartica, while the "Pastoral" shares some elements from the Five Mystical Songs of 1911.

Thematically, the work is bound together by two or three motives which recur throughout its length. One of these is first heard on the word "Gloria" in the first movement, and recurs whenever the word is introduced again. Another, introduced in the first narration, reappears at the beginning of the epilogue. In addition, the final setting of Milton's text uses the same melody as the first song for soprano, although orchestrated differently.

== Reception ==
Hodie was not well-received by critics, though it generally pleased audiences. Critics thought Vaughan Williams' compositional style too simple and direct, with one accusing Vaughan Williams of "primitivity" [sic]. In general in this period the octogenarian composer's nationalism had gone out of fashion and his older style suffered comparison with the new sounds coming from composers such as Benjamin Britten. Later critics, uninfluenced by this context, have been more generous.

== Instrumentation ==
Hodie calls for a large orchestra of three flutes (the third doubling piccolo), two oboes, cor anglais, two clarinets in B♭, two bassoons, contrabassoon; four French horns in F, three trumpets in B♭, two trombones, bass trombone, tuba; a percussion section that includes timpani, bass drum, snare drum, tenor drum, tubular bells, cymbals, glockenspiel and triangle; celesta, piano, organ; strings; SATB choir and boys' choir; and soprano, tenor and baritone soloists.

== Performance history ==
Hodie has not remained among Vaughan Williams' more popular compositions, and is done less frequently than many of his other works. Nevertheless, it is still performed on occasion, recently being telecast on PBS in a performance by the Mormon Tabernacle Choir. In addition, the following recordings have been made:

- London Symphony Orchestra cond. David Willcocks with John Shirley-Quirk, Richard Lewis, Janet Baker (soloists) – recorded 1965
- London Symphony Orchestra cond. Richard Hickox with Stephen Roberts, Robert Tear, Elizabeth Gale (soloists) – recorded 1990
- Royal Philharmonic Orchestra cond. Hilary Davan Wetton with Peter Hoare, Stephen Gadd, Janice Watson (soloists) – recorded 2007.

== Movements ==
=== I. Prologue ===
The cantata opens with jubilant fanfares for brass, soon followed by cries of "Nowell!" from the full chorus. These introduce a setting of part of the vespers service for Christmas Day, the only portion of the work that is not in English:

Latin text:

Nowell! Nowell! Nowell!
Hodie Christus natus est: hodie salvator apparuit:
Hodie in terra canunt angeli, laetantur archangeli:
Hodie exultant justi, dicentes: gloria in excelsis Deo: Alleluia.

English translation:

Christmas! Christmas! Christmas!
Today Christ is born: Today the Saviour appeared:
Today on Earth the Angels sing, Archangels rejoice:
Today the righteous rejoice, saying: Glory to God in the highest: Alleluia.

The setting of the text is direct and uncomplicated, apart from the varied settings of the final "Alleluia", yet it includes many rhythmic irregularities.

=== II. Narration ===
The following narration is one of several linking the various solo and choral movements of the piece. Each narration is scored for organ and boys' choir, and takes its text from various portions of the Gospels. The first such narration takes as its text Matthew 1:18-21 and 23 and Luke 1:32.

Now the birth of Jesus Christ was in this wise: when as his mother
Mary was espoused to Joseph, before they came together, she was
found with child of the Holy Ghost.

Then Joseph her husband, being a just man, was minded to put her
away privily. But while he thought on these things, behold, the
angel of the Lord appeared unto him in a dream.

The tenor soloist, introduced by a quiet woodwind melody, serves as the voice of the angel:

"Joseph, thou son of David, fear not to take unto thee Mary thy wife:
for that which is conceived in her is of the Holy Ghost. And she
shall bring forth a son, and thou shalt call his name JESUS."

The full chorus joins the soloist in the final part of the passage:

"He shall be great; and shall be called the Son of the Highest:
Emmanuel, God with us."

=== III. Song ===
The third movement is a gentle song for soprano, and sets a fragment of John Milton's poem "On the Morning of Christ's Nativity":

It was the winter wild,
While the Heaven-born child,

All meanly wrapt in the rude manger lies;

Nature in awe to him
Had doffed her gaudy trim,

With her great Master so to sympathise:

And waving wide her myrtle wand,
She strikes a universal peace through sea and land.
No war or battle's sound
Was heard the world around,

The idle spear and shield were high up hung;

The hooked chariot stood
Unstained with hostile blood,

The trumpet spake not to the armed throng,

And Kings sate still with awful eye,
As if they surely knew their sovran Lord was by.
But peaceful was the night
Wherein the Prince of light

His reign of peace upon the earth began:

The winds, with wonder whist,
Smoothly the waters kissed,

Whispering new joys to the mild ocean,

Who now hath quite forgot to rave,
While birds of calm sit brooding on the charmèd wave.

The women of the chorus join the soloist for portions of the last verse.

=== IV. Narration ===
The following narration is taken from Luke 2:1–7:

And it came to pass in those days, that there went out a decree from
Caesar Augustus, that all the world should be taxed. And all went to be
taxed, every one into his own city. And Joseph also went up into the
city of David, which is called Bethlehem; to be taxed with Mary his
espoused wife, being great with child.

And so it was, that, while they were there, the days were accomplished
that she should be delivered. And she brought forth her firstborn son,
and wrapped him in swaddling clothes, and laid him in a manger; because
there was no room for them in the inn.

=== V. Choral ===
The "choral" which follows is one of two in the cantata set for unaccompanied chorus, and uses a translation by Miles Coverdale of a hymn by Martin Luther:

The blessed son of God only
In a crib full poor did lie;
With our poor flesh and our poor blood
Was clothed that everlasting good.
Kyrie eleison.

The Lord Christ Jesu, God's son dear,
Was a guest and a stranger here;
Us for to bring from misery,
That we might live eternally.
Kyrie eleison.

All this did he for us freely,
For to declare his great mercy;
All Christendom be merry therefore,
And give him thanks for evermore.
Kyrie eleison.

=== VI. Narration ===
The following narration was adapted by the composer from Luke 2:8–17 and the Book of Common Prayer, and introduces the shepherds:

And there were in the same country shepherds abiding in the field,
keeping watch over their flock by night. And, lo, the angel of
the Lord came upon them, and the glory of the Lord shone round
about them: and they were sore afraid. And the angel said unto
them:

"Fear not: for, behold, I bring you good tidings of great joy,
which shall be to all people. For unto you is born this day in
the city of David a Saviour, which is Christ the Lord. And this
shall be a sign unto you; Ye shall find the babe wrapped in
swaddling clothes, lying in a manger."

And suddenly there was with the angel a multitude of the
heavenly host praising God, and saying:

"Glory to God in the highest and on earth peace, good will
toward men. We praise thee, we bless thee, we worship thee, we
glorify thee, we give thee thanks for thy great glory, O Lord
God, heavenly King, God the Father Almighty."

And it came to pass, as the angels were gone away from them
into heaven, the shepherds said one to another,
"Let us now go even unto Bethlehem, and see this thing which
is come to pass, which the Lord hath made known unto us."

And they came with haste, and found Mary, and Joseph, and the
babe lying in a manger. And when they had seen it, they made
known abroad the saying which was told them concerning this child.
And all they that heard it wondered at those things which were
told them by the shepherds.

Once again, the tenor sings the words of the angel; the chorus, introduced by the soprano, sings the words of the heavenly host. The men of the chorus sing the part of the shepherds.

=== VII. Song ===
This movement features the baritone soloist, and is introduced by quiet and atmospheric woodwinds. Its text is "The Oxen" by Thomas Hardy:

Christmas Eve, and twelve of the clock.
"Now they are all on their knees,"
An elder said as we sat in a flock
By the embers in hearthside ease.

We pictured the meek mild creatures where
They dwelt in their strawy pen,
Nor did it occur to one of us there
To doubt they were kneeling then.

So fair a fancy few would weave
In these years! Yet I feel,
If someone said on Christmas Eve,
"Come; see the oxen kneel,

In the lonely barton by yonder coomb
Our childhood used to know,"
I should go with him in the gloom,
Hoping it might be so.

=== VIII. Narration ===
The following narration is taken from Luke, 2:20:

And the shepherds returned, glorifying and praising God
for all the things that they had heard and seen, as it was
told unto them.

"Glory to God in the highest."

=== IX. Pastoral ===
This song is again scored for the baritone soloist, and is a setting of a poem by George Herbert:

The shepherds sing; and shall I silent be?
My God, no hymn for Thee?
My soul's a shepherd too; a flock it feeds
Of thoughts, and words, and deeds.
The pasture is Thy word: the streams, Thy grace
Enriching all the place.

Shepherd and flock shall sing, and all my powers
Outsing the daylight hours.
Then will we chide the sun for letting night
Take up his place and right:
We sing one common Lord; wherefore he should
Himself the candle hold.

I will go searching, till I find a sun
Shall stay, till we have done;
A willing shiner, that shall shine as gladly,
As frost-nipped suns look sadly.

Then will we sing, and shine all our own day,
And one another pay:
His beams shall cheer my breast, and both so twine,
Till ev'n His beams sing, and my music shine.

=== X. Narration ===
The following narration takes its text from Luke 2:19:

But Mary kept all these things, and pondered them in her own heart.

=== XI. Lullaby ===
Scored for soprano and women's chorus, the lullaby is based upon an anonymous text which is also known in a setting by Benjamin Britten:

Sweet was the song the Virgin sang,

When she to Bethlem Juda came

And was delivered of a Son,

That blessed Jesus hath to name:

"Lulla, lulla, lulla-bye,
Sweet Babe," sang she,

And rocked him sweetly on her knee.

"Sweet Babe," sang she, "my son,

And eke a Saviour born,

Who hath vouchsafèd from on high

To visit us that were forlorn:

"Lalula, lalula, lalula-bye,
Sweet Babe," sang she,

And rocked him sweetly on her knee.

=== XII. Hymn ===
The hymn which follows represents the only solo movement for the tenor in the entire cantata, and was reportedly a late addition made when the original tenor soloist complained about the size of his part. Its text is the poem "Christmas Day" by William Drummond of Hawthornden:

Bright portals of the sky,

Emboss'd with sparkling stars,

Doors of eternity,

With diamantine bars,

Your arras rich uphold,

Loose all your bolts and springs,

Ope wide your leaves of gold,

That in your roofs may come the King of Kings.

O well-spring of this All!

Thy Father's image vive;

Word, that from nought did call

What is, doth reason, live;

The soul's eternal food,

Earth's joy, delight of heaven;

All truth, love, beauty, good:

To thee, to thee be praises ever given!

O glory of the heaven!

O sole delight of earth!

To thee all power be given,

God's uncreated birth!

Of mankind lover true,

Indearer of his wrong,

Who doth the world renew,

Still be thou our salvation and our song!

The movement is brilliantly scored for full orchestra, and opens with a bright brass fanfare.

=== XIII. Narration ===
The following narration is adapted from Matthew 2:1-11:

Now when Jesus was born, behold there came wise men from the east,
saying, "Where is he that is born King? for we have seen his star in
the east, and are come to worship him." And they said unto them,
"In Bethlehem." When they had heard that, they departed; and, lo,
the star, which they saw in the east, went before them, till it came
and stood over where the young child was. When they saw the star,
they rejoiced with exceeding great joy. And when they were come into
the house, they saw the young child with Mary his mother, and fell
down, and worshipped him: and when they had opened their treasures,
they presented unto him gifts; gold, and frankincense, and myrrh.

The voice of the kings is provided by the men of the chorus.

=== XIV. The March of the Three Kings ===
The March of the Three Kings represents the first time since the beginning of the cantata that the soloists, choir, and orchestra sing a movement together. The chorus introduces the march, whose text was written expressly for the composer by his wife, Ursula. Each soloist sings a separate verse—each describing one king and his gift—before finishing the march together.

From kingdoms of wisdom secret and far
come Caspar, Melchior, Balthasar;
they ride through time, they ride through night
led by the star's foretelling light.

Crowning the skies
the star of morning, star of dayspring calls,
lighting the stable and the broken walls
where the prince lies.

Gold from the veins of earth he brings,
red gold to crown the King of Kings.
Power and glory here behold
shut in a talisman of gold.

Frankincense from those dark hands
was gathered in eastern, sunrise lands,
incense to burn both night and day
to bear the prayers a priest will say.

Myrrh is a bitter gift for the dead.
Birth but begins the path you tread;
your way is short, your days foretold
by myrrh, and frankincense and gold.

Return to kingdoms secret and far,
Caspar, Melchior, Balthasar,
ride through the desert, retrace the night
leaving the star's imperial light.

Crowning the skies
the star of morning, star of dayspring, calls:
clear on the hilltop its sharp radiance falls
lighting the stable and the broken walls
where the prince lies.

=== XV. Choral ===
The text of the second choral, again for unaccompanied chorus, is taken from an anonymous poem; the second verse was again furnished by the composer's wife:

No sad thought his soul affright,
Sleep it is that maketh night;
Let no murmur nor rude wind
To his slumbers prove unkind:
But a quire of angels make
His dreams of heaven, and let him wake
To as many joys as can
In this world befall a man.

Promise fills the sky with light,
Stars and angels dance in flight;
Joy of heaven shall now unbind
Chains of evil from mankind,
Love and joy their power shall break,
And for a new born prince’s sake;
Never since the world began
Such a light such dark did span.

=== XVI. Epilogue ===
The epilogue opens with a setting, for the three soloists, of a text adapted from John 1:1, 4, and 14, and Matthew 1:23:

In the beginning was the Word, and the Word was with God,
and the Word was God. In him was life; and the life was the
light of men. And the Word was made flesh, and dwelt among
us, full of grace and truth. Emmanuel, God with us.

The chorus joins in on the final words, and the remainder of the work is scored for full chorus and orchestra, with soloists. It again sets Milton's words, slightly adapted, from "On the Morning of Christ's Nativity":

Ring out, ye crystal spheres,
Once bless our human ears,

If ye have power to touch our senses so;

And let your silver chime

Move in melodious time,
And let the bass of heaven's deep organ blow;
And with your ninefold harmony
Make up full consort to the angelic symphony.

Such music (as 'tis said)
Before was never made,

But when of old the sons of the morning sung,

While the Creator great
His constellations set,

And the well-balanced world on hinges hung,
And cast the dark foundations deep,
And bid the weltering waves their oozy channel keep.

Yea, truth and justice then
Will down return to men,

Orbed in a rainbow; and, like glories wearing,

Mercy will sit between,
Throned in celestial sheen,

With radiant feet the tissued clouds down steering;
And heaven, as at some festival,
Will open wide the gates of her high palace hall.
