= Princess Charming (operetta) =

Operetta composed by Albert Szirmai

Alice Delysia and George Grossmith, Jr in London, 1926

Princess Charming is an operetta with music composed by Albert Szirmai. The English libretto by Arthur Wimperis and Lauri Wylie is based on the Hungarian libretto by Franz Martos. The operetta is set in the Palace of the Elyrian Embassy in the fictional European country of Novia and the Sigman Castle adjoining the Royal Palace. The story concerns a young princess who accepts a proposal of marriage from the elderly king of a neighboring country as protection against an uprising by her own subjects. Captain Torrelli, a military officer sent by the king, fears imminent danger to the princess and marries her himself. The officer then escorts her to his king for an annulment, but the couple fall in love and elope.

The operetta was first presented in Hungarian in 1925 in Budapest as Alexandra. Its English-language premier was in London in 1926, and it was revived on Broadway and elsewhere. A 1934 film adaptation was made, starring Evelyn Laye.

== Productions ==
After its 1925 Hungarian premiere in Budapest, the operetta was produced in English in London's West End on 21 October 1926. It ran for a very successful 362 performances at the Palace Theatre. The production was produced by Robert Courtneidge. The production then toured in Britain.

After a rewrite of the book by Jack Donahue, with additional lyrics by producer Arthur Swanstrom and additional music by Arthur Schwartz, the work was presented on Broadway at the Imperial Theatre on October 13, 1930, closing after 56 performances on November 29, 1930. The production starred Evelyn Herbert as the princess, Jeanne Aubert as Wanda Navarro, Grossmith as King Christian II of Elyria, Victor Moore as Irving Huff, Douglass Dumbrille as Ivanoff and Berry as Albert Chuff. Two up-and-coming entertainers were in smaller roles, Howard St. John as the king's aide and Ernest McChesney as the second lieutenant.

The show was also produced by the J. C. Williamson company in Australia.

It was adapted as a film in 1934, starring Grossmith, Yvonne Arnaud, Evelyn Laye, Max Miller, Henry Wilcoxon and Cecil Parker.

== Songs (London version) ==
Act 1

- Take a Letter to the King – Baron Sigman, Marie and Girls
- Palace of Dreams – Princess Elaine of Novia, Officers and Girls
- The Panic's On – Lulu and Girls
- I'll Be There – Wanda Navarro, Irving Huff and Rasch Ballet
- Trailing a Shooting Star – Princess Elaine and Captain Torrelli
- Here Is a Sword – Captain Torrelli and Sailors
- I'll Be There (Reprise) – Wanda and Captain Torrelli
- One for All – Ivanoff and Revolutionists
- I Love Love (Lyrics by Walter O'Keefe, Music by Robert Emmett Dolan) – Wanda, Officers and Girls
- You – Princess Elaine and Captain Torrelli

Act 2

- A Wonderful Thing for the King – Christian II of Elyria, Lulu and Girls
- Not Old Enough To Be Old – Albert Chuff
- I'll Be There (Reprise) – Wanda and Christian II
- I'll Never Leave You – Princess Elaine and Captain Torrelli
- You (Reprise) – Princess Elaine
- I'll Never Leave You (Reprise) – Princess Elaine and Captain Torrelli
- Wings of the Morning – Rasch Ballet

== Roles and original London cast ==
- Baron Sigman – Peter Gawthorne
- Commander de Selto – Bernard Clifton
- Marie – Eileen Redcott
- Albert Chuff – W. H. Berry
- Captain Torelli – John Clarke
- Princess Eileen – Winnie Melville (later Evelyn Laye)
- Lieutenant – Gerald Nodin
- Wanda Navarro – Alice Delysia
- Ivanoff – Edmund Willard
- Lord Chamberlain – Charles Penrose
- Christian II of Sylvania – George Grossmith Jr
- Aide de camp – Edward O'Bryen
- Attorney General – Ernest Graham

Source: The Stage

== Critical response ==
Reviewing the Broadway production in 1930, Time noted: "The fact that it has sparkle and distinction is almost entirely attributable to blithe, blonde, beauteous Jeanne Aubert. As the Princess, Evelyn Herbert ... is luscious-looking, hits good rich notes but experiences difficulty in making the lyrics intelligible."

Steven Suskin wrote that the operetta "was not especially distinguished, though it contained one song hit – the snappy, interpolated 'I Love Love'".
