= Roderick Williams =

British baritone and composer (born 1965)

Roderick Williams OBE
- Born: Roderick Gregory Coleman Williams; 1965 (age 60–61); London, England
- Education: Christ Church Cathedral School; Haberdashers' Aske's Boys' School; Magdalen College, Oxford; Guildhall School of Music
- Occupations: Baritone singer and composer

Roderick Gregory Coleman Williams OBE (born 1965) is a British baritone and composer.

== Biography ==
Roderick Williams was born in North London to a Welsh father and a Jamaican mother. He attended Christ Church Cathedral School in Oxford and Haberdashers' Aske's Boys' School, a public school in Hertfordshire. He was a choral scholar at Magdalen College, Oxford, and then became a music teacher and led the Tiffin Boys Choir. At the age of 28, he resumed music studies at the Guildhall School of Music in London. At Guildhall, he made his operatic debut as Tarquinius in Benjamin Britten's The Rape of Lucretia.

Williams first appeared at The Proms in 1996 as the Royal Herald in Verdi's Don Carlos. He was a soloist at the 2013 Proms production of Ralph Vaughan Williams' A Sea Symphony’, and again in 2014 Last Night of the Proms, which included performances of his own arrangements of two songs. His commercial recordings include albums for Naxos and for Signum. In 2006, Williams and the Sacconi Quartet made the premiere recording of Gerald Finzi's 1921-22 song cycle By Footpath and Stile.

Williams is the president of Junior Saint James Singers and has been the president of Malvern Concert Club since July 2014 and of the Three Choirs Festival Society since December 2016.

He was appointed an Officer of the Order of the British Empire (OBE) in the 2017 Birthday Honours for services to music. In 2019 he was announced as Patron of Birmingham Bach Choir. In 2020 he was appointed President of the London concert series Thames Concerts. In 2022, he was appointed a Vice-President of The Bach Choir.

Williams and his wife, Miranda, have two daughters and a son. His sister-in-law is the stage director Orpha Phelan.

In 2022, Williams became a Patron of Opera Brava, "Britain's leading outdoor touring Opera Company." In 2023, he was announced as one of the composers who would each create a brand new piece for the Coronation of Charles III and Camilla.

== Operatic repertoire ==
- Escamillo in Carmen by Bizet
- Sid in Albert Herring by Britten
- Billy Budd in Billy Budd by Britten
- Henry Cuffe in Gloriana by Britten
- Ned Keene and Balstrode in Peter Grimes by Britten
- Tarquinius in The Rape of Lucretia by Britten
- Top in The Tender Land by Copland
- Belcore in L'elisir d'amore by Donizetti
- Albert in Werther by Massenet
- Don Giovanni in Don Giovanni by Mozart
- Guglielmo in Così fan tutte by Mozart
- The Count in Le nozze di Figaro by Mozart
- Papageno in Die Zauberflöte by Mozart
- Prince Andrei Bolkonsky in War and Peace by Prokofiev
- Marcello in La bohème by Puccini
- Schaunard in La bohème by Puccini
- Figaro in Il barbiere di Siviglia by Rossini
- Harlequin in Ariadne auf Naxos by Strauss
- Onegin in Eugene Onegin by Tchaikovsky
- The King's Herald in Don Carlos by Verdi

== Recordings ==
=== Songs with piano or chamber accompaniment ===
- Complete Cantatas Rameau With Rachel Elliott, soprano, James Gilchrist, tenor, and Thomas Guthrie, bass. New Chamber Opera Ensemble Cond. Gary Cooper 1998 ASV Ltd CD GAX 234/1 and /2
- The Songs of Percy Turnbull Turnbull With Nancy Argenta, soprano and Robin Bowman, piano. 2000 Somme SOMMCD 020
- Blood-red Carnations Songs by Schoenberg With Sarah Connolly, mezzo-soprano, Iain Burnside, piano. 2002 Black Box
- I said to Love - Let Us Garlands Bring - Before and After Summer Finzi With Iain Burnside, piano 2004 Naxos 8.557644
- Songs of Travel - The House of Life - Four poems by Fredegond Shove Vaughan Williams With Iain Burnside, piano. 2004 Naxos 8.557643
- Beastly Tales Panufnik With Patricia Rozario, soprano, Yvonne Howard, mezzo-soprano, City of London Sinfonia cond. Sian Edwards 2005 EMI Classics 0946 3 56692 2 0
- Earth and Air and Rain - By Footpath and Stile - To a Poet Finzi With Iain Burnside, piano and the Sacconi Quartet. 2005/6 Naxos 8.557963
- Severn & Somme Howells, Sanders, Wilson, Venables With Susie Allan, piano. 2006 Somm SOMMCD 057
- The Sky Shall Be Our Roof Songs from the operas of Vaughan Williams With Sarah Fox, soprano, Juliette Pochin, mezzo-soprano, Andrew Staples, Iain Burnside, piano. 2007 Albion Records ALB001
- Complete Solo Songs Moeran With Geraldine McGreevy, soprano, Adrian Thompson, Tenor, John Talbot, piano. 2008/9 Chandos CHAN 10596(2)
- Songs before Sleep Richard Rodney Bennett With Sophie Daneman, soprano, Susan Bickley, Mezzo-soprano, Benjamin Hulett, tenor, Oliver Coates, cello and Iain Burnside, piano. 2009 NMC Recordings NMC D155
- Songs Michael Head With Ailish Tynan, soprano, Catherine Wyn-Rogers, mezzo-soprano, Christopher Glynn, piano. 2009 Hyperion CDA67899
- Songs from A Shropshire Lad - Folk Songs from Sussex Butterworth With Iain Burnside, piano. 2010 Naxos 8.572426
- Songs and Proverbs of Williams Blake - Tit for Tat - Folk-songs Britten With Iain Burnside, piano. 2011 Naxos 8.572600
- Songs - The Airmen Shaw With Sophie Bevan, soprano, Andrew Kennedy, tenor, Iain Burnside, piano. 2012 Delphian DCD 33105
- Italienisches Liederbuch Wolf With Joan Rodgers, soprano, Roger Vignoles, piano. 2012 Champs Hill Records CHRCD054
- The Isles of Greece (from the CD 'Wild Cyclamen') Hugh Wood With Iain Burnside, piano. 2014 NMC Recordings
- Time and the Seasons from A Portrait of Robert Saxton Saxton with Andrew West, piano. 2014 Métier msv 28624
- Dylan - The Drowning of Capel Celyn Stimpson With Sioned Williams, harp. 2006/2015 Stone Records
- Songs Mahler arr. Schoenberg With Susan Platts, mezzo-soprano, Charles Reid, tenor, Attacca Quartet, Virginia Arts Festival Chamber Players, Joann Falletta 2015 Naxos 8.573536
- Twelve Sets of English Lyrics - Volume 1 Parry With Susan Gritton, soprano, James Gilchrist, tenor, Andrew West, piano. 2015 Somm SOMMCD 257
- The Songs of Donald Swann With Dame Felicity Lott, soprano, Kathryn Rudge, mezzo-soprano, John Mark Ainsley, tenor, Christopher Glynn, piano. 2015/2016 Hyperion CDA68172
- Twelve Sets of English Lyrics - Volume 2 Parry With Sarah Fox, soprano, James Gilchrist, tenor, Andrew West, piano. 2017 Somm SOMMCD 270
- Twelve Sets of English Lyrics - Volume 3 Parry With Sarah Fox, soprano, Andrew West, piano. 2017 Somm SOMMCD 272
- Man and Bat Skempton Ensemble 360 2017 First Hand Records FHR90
- Romanzen aus Die Schöne Magelone / Vier ernste Gesänge Brahms With Roger Vignoles, piano. 2017 Champs Hill Records CHRCD108
- Winter Journey Schubert's Winterreise in an English version by Jeremy Sams With Christopher Glynn, piano. 2017 Signum SIGCD531
- Those Blue Remembered Hills Songs by Gurney, Howells With the Bridge Quartet, Michael Dussek, piano 2018 EM Records
- Die Schöne Müllerin Schubert With Iain Burnside, piano. 2018 Chandos CHAN 20113
- The Song of Love songs by Vaughan Williams With Kitty Whately, mezzo-soprano, Williams Vann, piano 2018 Albion ALBCD037
- Time and Space songs by Holst and Vaughan Williams With Mary Bevan, soprano, Williams Vann, Jack Liebeck, violin. 2018 Albion ALBCD038
- Schwanengesang/ An die ferne Geliebte Schubert/Beethoven With Iain Burnside, piano. 2019 Chandos CHAN 20126
- Maud - A Shropshire Lad Somervell With Susie Allan, piano. 2019 Somm SOMMCD 0615
- Schwanengesang Schubert An die ferne Geliebte Beethoven With Iain Burnside, piano. 2020 Chandos 20126
- Birdsong Songs by Brahms, Clara Schumann, Robert Schumann, Beamish With Andrew West, piano. 2020 Somm SOMMCD 0633
- Folk Songs Volume 1 Vaughan Williams With Mary Bevan, soprano, Nicky Spence, tenor, Jack Liebeck, violin, William Vann, piano. 2020 Albion Records ALBCD042
- Folk Songs Volume 2 Vaughan Williams With Mary Bevan, soprano, Nicky Spence, tenor, Thomas Gould, violin, Williams Vann, piano. 2020 Albion Records ALBCD043
- Folk Songs Volume 3 Vaughan Williams With Mary Bevan, soprano, Nicky Spence. tenor, Williams Vann, piano 2020 Albion Records ALBCD044
- Folk Songs Volume 4 Vaughan Williams With Mary Bevan, soprano, Nicky Spence, tenor, William Vann, piano 2020 Albion Records ALBCD045
- Winterreise Schubert With Iain Burnside, piano. 2021 Chandos CHAN 20163
- Mirages: The Art of French Song With Roger Vignoles, piano. 2021 Champs Hill Records CHRCD159
- Façade Walton With Tamsin Dalley, The Orchestra of The Swan cond. Bruce O'Neil 2021 Somm SOMMCD 277
- On This Shining Night Warlock, Barber, Beamish, Delius With Sophie Bevan, soprano, James Gilchrist, tenor, the Coull Quartet 2021 Somm SOMMCD 0654
- Songs of William Busch Busch and others With Diana Moore, mezzo-sorano, Robin Tritschler, tenor, John Reid, piano. 2021 Lyrita SRCD.409
- Schubert in English Vol. 4 with Rowan Pierce, soprano, Christopher Glynn. 2022 Signum Classics SIGCD770
- Schumann in English Volume 1 with Ailish Tynan, soprano, Kathryn Rudge, mezzo soprano, and Christopher Glynn, piano. 2022 Signum Classics SIGCD782
- Sounds and Sweet Airs - a Shakespeare Songbook with Carolyn Sampson, soprano, Joseph Middleton, piano. 2023 BIS Records BIS-2653
- Vaughan Williams: a Birthday Garland with Susie Allan, Piano. 2023 Somm Recordings SOMMCD 0683

=== Oratorio, cantata and other orchestral and choral works ===
- Shield of Faith Bliss Finzi Singers dir. Paul Spicer 1991 Chandos CHAN 8980
- In terra pax Frank Martin London Philharmonic, Brighton Festival Chorus cond. Matthias Bamert 1995 Chandos CHAN 9465
- The Hag/Two songs of Robert Bridges Frank Bridge BBC National Orchestra of Wales cond. Richard Hickox 2003 Chandos CHAN 10246
- Mass of the Children Rutter The Cambridge Singers, Cantate Youth Choir, City of London Sinfonia cond. John Rutter 2003 Collegium Records COLCD 129
- The Crucifixion Stainer Guildford Philharmonic Orchestra, Guildford Camerata cond. Barry Rose 2003 Lammas Records LAMM 154D
- Christopher Columbus - A Musical Journey Walton BBC National Orchestra and Chorus of Wales cond. Richard Hickox 2004 Chandos CHSA 5034
- The Apostles Elgar Canterbury Choral Society, Philharmonia Orchestra cond. Richard Cooke 2005 Quartz QTZ 2017
- Fantasia on Christmas Carols/The First Nowell/On Christmas Night Vaugan Williams City of London Sinfonia cond. Richard Hickox 2005 Chandos CHAN 10385
- Symphony No.1 - "Oliver Cromwell" Rutland Boughton BBC Concert Orchestra cond. Handley 2006 Dutton CDLX 7185
- Sir Patrick Spens Howells Katy Butler, soprano, James Gilchrist, tenor, Bournemouth Symphony Orchestra cond. David Hill 2006 Naxos 8.570352
- Five Poems of the Spirit Bairstow With The Choir of St John's College, Cambridge, Britten Sinfonia cond. David Hill 2007 Hyperion CDA67497
- Omar Khayyam Bantock With Catherine Wyn-Rogers, mezzo-soprano, Toby Spence, tenor, BBC Symphony Chorus, BBC Symphony Orchestra cond. Vernon Handley 2005/2007 Chandos CHSA 5051(3)
- Vespers Mozart Requiem Fauré The Sixteen & Academy of St Martin in the Fields cond. Harry Christophers 2007 Coro CORI6057
- In terra pax/ A spotless rose Finzi/Howells With City of London Choir, Bournemouth Symphony Orchestra con. Hilary Davan Wetton 2009 Vaxos 8.572102
- Pageant of Empire/Sea Pictures Elgar, Lights Out Gurney Shore Leave Hurd BBC Concert Orchewstra cond. Martin Yates 2009 Epoch CDLX 7243
- Sea Drift/Cynara Delius Hallé Orchestra, Choir and Youth Choir cond. Sir Mark Elder 2011/12 CD HLL 7535
- Ring Dance of the Nazarene/The Moth Requiem Birtwistle BBC Singers, The Nash Ensemble cond. Nicholas Kok 2013 Signum Classoc SIGCD368
- Falling Nan/Movie House/Songs of Innocence Kenneth Fuchs London Symphony Orchestra cond. JoAnn Falletta 2013 Naxos 8.559753
- Aftertones/No Man's Land Colin Matthews Hallé Choir and Orchestra cond. Nicholas Collon 2014 CD HLL 7538
- Requiem da Camera Finzi London Mozart Players cond. Hilary Davan Wetton 2014 Naxos 8.573426
- Israel in Egypt Handel Nederlands Kamerkoor Le Concert Lorrain cond. Roy Goodman 2014 ET'CETERA
- Three Nocturnes Vaughan Williams BBC Symphony Orchestra cond. Martyn Brabbins 2015 Albion Records
- Israel in Agypten Handel/Mendelssohn With Choir of the King's Consort, The King's Consort, cond. Robert King 2015 VIVAT 111
- Fantasia on Christmas Carols Vaughan Williams With the Choir of Magdalen College Oxford, cond. Daniel Hyde 2016 Opus Arte OA CD9022
- Songs Elgar BBC Philharmonic Orchestra cond. Sir Andrew Davis 2017 Chandos CHSA 5188
- Choral Symphony Dyson Bach Choir, Bournemouth Symphony Orchestra dir. David Hill 2017 Naxos 8.573770
- Four Last Songs Vaughan Williams Bergen Philharmonic Orchestra cond. Sir Andrew Davis 2017 Chandos CHSA 5186
- Dream Song Daniel Kidane Chineke! Orchestra and Chorus cond. Anthony Parnther 2018 NMC Recordings NMC D250
- L'Enfance du Christ Berlioz Melbourne Symphony Orchestra and Chorus cond. Sir Andrew Davis 2018 Chandos CHSA 5228(2)
- Songs of Travel Vaughan Williams Royal Scottish National Orchestra cond. Martin Yates 2018 Dutton Epoch CDLX 7359
- England, my England Vaughan Williams BBC Symphony Orchestra and Chorus cond. Martyn Brabbins 2019 Hyperion CDA68396
- Messiah Handel Rias Kammerchor Berlin Akademie für Alte Musik Berlin cond. Justin Doyle 2020 PENTATONE
- Christmas Oratorio James MacMillan London Philharmonic Orchestra & Choir cond. Sir Mark Elder 2021 LC 25251
- A Shropshire Lad: English Songs orchestrated by Roderick Williams Various composers The Hallé Orchestra cond. Sir Mark Elder 2022 Siemens CD HLL 7559
- Da Vinci Requiem Cecilia McDowall City of London Sinfonia cond. Neil Ferris 2022 Signum Classics SIGCD749
- Suite from Wuthering Heights Bernard Herrmann Singapore Symphony Orchestra cond. Mario Venzago 2022 Chandos CHSA 5337
- Eine Messe ses Lebens Delius Bergen Philharmonic Orchestra and Choir and Collegioum Musicum Choir cond. Sir Mark Elder 2022 LAWO LWC1265
- La Belle Dame Quilter/Holst/O'Neill/Scott BBC Concert Ordchestra cond. John Andrews 2023 EM Records
- One World Karl Jenkins World Orchestra for Peace cond. Sir Karl Jenkins 2023 UMG Recordings 4839748
- The Coronation of Their Majesties King Charles III and Queen Camilla The Official Album 2023 Decca

=== Opera ===
- Ned Keene: Peter Grimes Britten City of London Sinfonia cond. Richard Hickox 1995 Chandos CHAN 94477/8
- Obstinate, Watchful, First Shepherd: The Pilgrim's Progress Vaughan Williams Chorus and Orchestra of the Royal House cond. Richard Hickox 1997 Chandos CH 9625(2)
- Prince Andrey Bolkonsky: War and Peace Prokofiev Spoleto Festival Orchestra cond. Richard Hickox 1999 Chandos 9855
- Gallanthus: The Poisoned Kiss Vaughan Williams BBC National Orchestra of Wales cond. Richard Hickox 2003 Chandos CHAN 10120(2)
- Rôle uncredited: A Hand of Bridge Barber Royal Scottish National Orchestra cond. Marin Alsop 2003 Naxos 8.559135
- Head Reaper: Ruth Lennox Berkeley City of London Sinfonia cond. Richard Hickox 2003 Chandos CHAN 10301
- The Earl of Dunmow: A Dinner Engagement Lennox Berkeley City of London Sinfonia cond. Richard Hickox 2003 Chandos CHAN 10219
- Mercury: The Judgment of Paris Eccles Early Opera Company cond. Christian Curnyn 2008 Chandos CHAN 0759
- Wandering Jew: The Wandering Jew Saxton BBC Symphony Orchestra, BBC Singers cond. André de Ridder 2008/09 NMC Recordings NMC D170
- Harlequin Ariadne on Naxos Richard Strauss Scottish Chamber Orchestra cond. Sir Richard Armstrong 2010 Chandos CHAN 3168(2)
- Captain Balstrode: Peter Grimes Britten Bergen Philharmonic Orchestra and Choirs cond. Edward Gardner 2019 Chandos CHSA 5250(2)

== Composition ==
Williams was commissioned by the Financial Times in 2014 to compose a Christmas carol, "Christmas Bells", a setting of a poem by Longfellow. It was premiered by the Godwine Choir at St George the Martyr church in Southwark, London. His choral orchestral setting of Keats' To Autumn was commissioned by the Waynflete Singers in 2019 and was premiered in Winchester Cathedral on 16 October 2021.
