= The Oxen =

Poem by Thomas Hardy

"The Oxen" is a poem (sometimes known by its first line, "Christmas Eve, and Twelve of the Clock") by the English novelist and poet Thomas Hardy (1840–1928). It relates to a West Country legend: that, on the anniversary of Christ's Nativity, each Christmas Day, farm animals kneel in their stalls in homage. It was first published in December 1915, in the London newspaper The Times. It has been set to music many times.

== Musical settings ==
These include (in date order, where known):

- 1919 – Graham Peel (1878–1937), for voice and piano
- 1920 – Edward Joseph Dent (1876–1957), for voice and piano
- 1921–22 – Gerald Finzi (1901–56), for voice and orchestra, as the third piece in his song cycle By Footpath and Stile, Op. 2
- 1927 – Leslie Cochran, for voice and piano
- 1945 – Robert Fleming (1921–76), for medium voice and piano
- 1951 – Armstrong Gibbs (1889–1960), for voice and piano
- 1954 – Ralph Vaughan Williams (1872–1958), for baritone and orchestra, No. 7 in his cantata Hodie
- 1954 – Robert Williams, for unison chorus and piano
- 1958 – Richard K. Winslow (born 1918), for SATB chorus and piano or organ
- 1963 – William Reginald Pasfield (1909–94), for unison chorus and piano
- 1967 – Alan Rawsthorne (1905–71), for mixed chorus a cappella
- 1968 – Benjamin Britten (1913–76), for SA chorus and piano
- 1991 – Jonathan Rathbone, a capella, for the SATB popular group The Swingle Singers
- 2009 – Derek Holman (born 1931), as "Christmas Eve", for voice and piano, No.2 in his The Four Seasons
- Jonathan Elkus (born 1931), for high voice and piano
