= Derek Oldham =

English singer and actor (1887–1968)

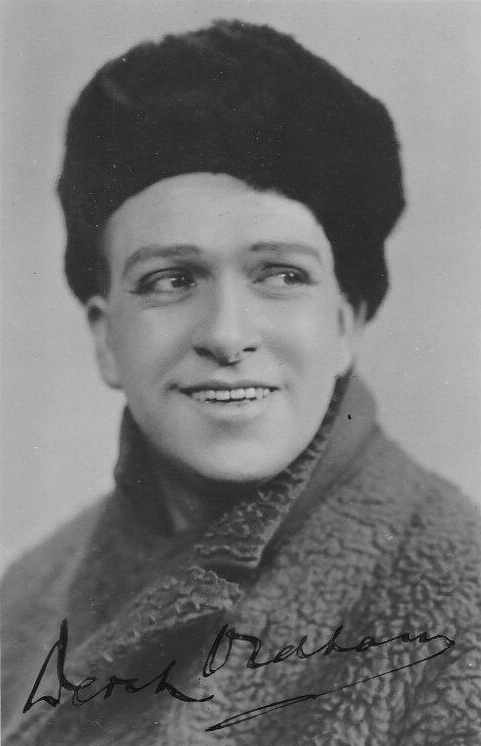
Oldham in a 1925 publicity photo for Rose-Marie

Derek Oldham (29 March 1887 – 20 March 1968) was an English singer and actor, best known for his performances in the tenor roles of the Savoy Operas with the D'Oyly Carte Opera Company.

After performing in concerts as a boy soprano and working as a bank clerk, Oldham began a professional performing career in 1914. With the outbreak of World War I, he joined the Scots Guards, serving with valour. After the war, he joined the D'Oyly Carte Opera Company, singing the tenor leads in the Gilbert and Sullivan operas for three years. He then starred in musicals and operettas in the West End in the 1920s, including Madame Pompadour, The Merry Widow, Rose-Marie and The Vagabond King. He returned to the D'Oyly Carte for brief periods from 1929 to 1937.

Oldham continued singing, recording and acting through the 1940s, also appearing in several films. He concentrated on legitimate theatre in the 1950s, acting until the age of 70. He maintained a lifelong interest in Gilbert and Sullivan, serving as an officer of the Gilbert and Sullivan Society. He finally retired to Hampshire during the last ten years of his life.

== Life and career ==
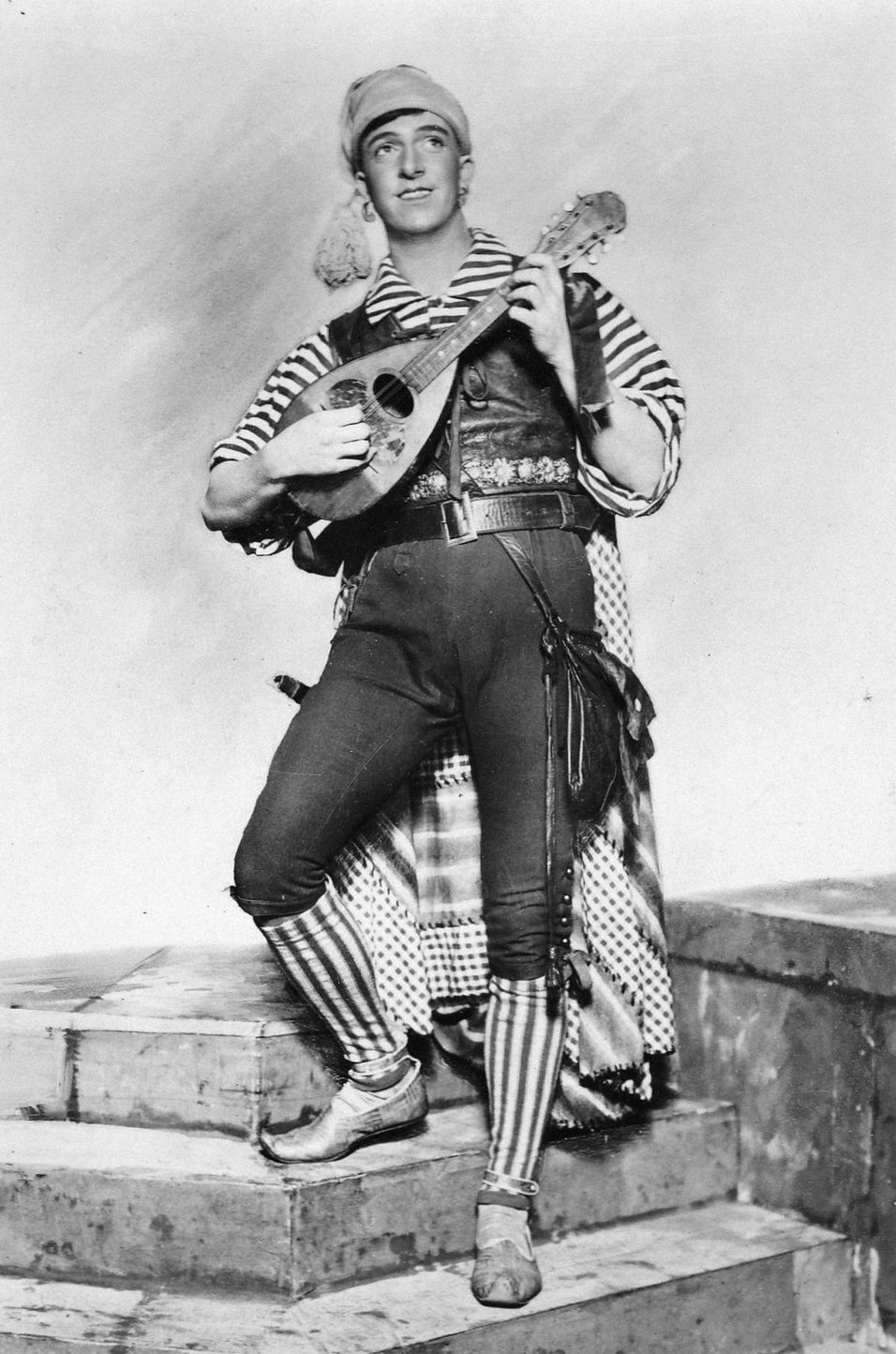
Oldham as Marco in The Gondoliers

Oldham was born John Stephens Oldham in Accrington, Lancashire, the son of Thomas Oldham and his wife Harriett, née Stephens. He had an elder brother, George, and a sister. As a child, Oldham was a boy soprano in demand for over five years in oratorios (including Sullivan's The Golden Legend and The Prodigal Son), concerts (including "Neath My Lattice" from Sullivan's The Rose of Persia), and pantomimes. As a young man, he worked as a bank clerk and sang in amateur operatic societies.

He debuted on the professional adult stage in 1914, as Julien in The Daring of Diane, an operetta by Alfred Anderson and Heinrich Reinhardt, presented at the London Pavilion. He made an immediate mark: The Observer said that he "has an exceptionally charming tenor voice, uses it with fine art, and acts with engaging simplicity and sincerity." Later that year, at the Lyric Theatre, he played Bumerli in The Chocolate Soldier, in which he also won excellent notices. At the end of that year, after the outbreak of World War I, he joined the Scots Guards, a year later was commissioned in the East Lancashire Regiment and was awarded the Military Cross for gallantry in Macedonia in 1918. During the war, he formed a concert group to entertain his fellow servicemen, also producing The Chocolate Soldier not far from enemy lines.

=== D'Oyly Carte and musical comedy years ===
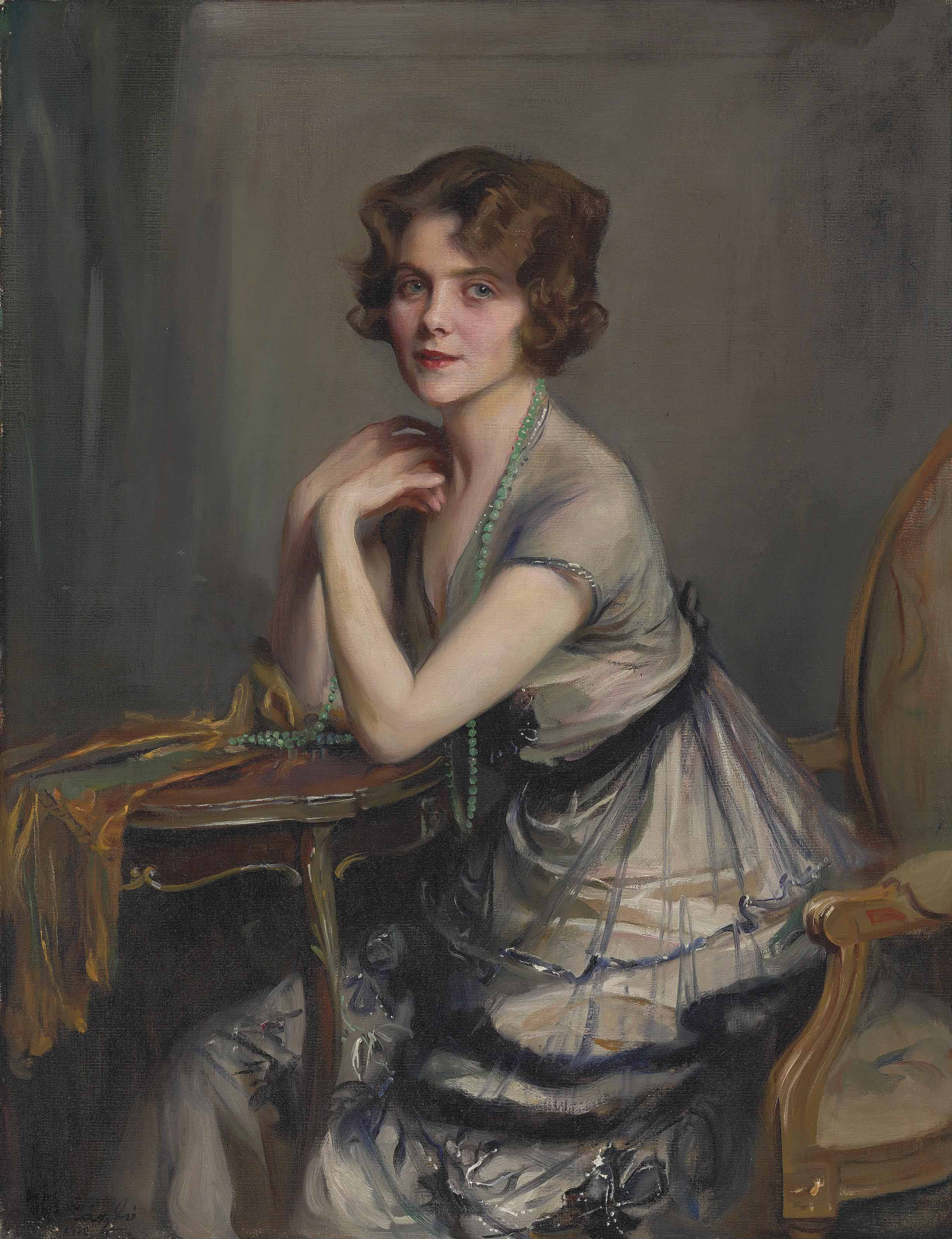
Winnie Melville, later Oldham's wife, in 1920

Oldham was demobilised in July 1919 and joined the D'Oyly Carte Opera Company the following month, when the company opened its first London season in over a decade. He immediately assumed the leading Gilbert and Sullivan tenor roles of Alexis in The Sorcerer, Lord Tolloller in Iolanthe, Cyril in Princess Ida, Nanki-Poo in The Mikado, Colonel Fairfax in The Yeomen of the Guard, and Marco in The Gondoliers. The following year, he also took on the roles of Ralph Rackstraw in H.M.S. Pinafore, Frederic in The Pirates of Penzance, and Richard Dauntless in Ruddigore. In 1921 he exchanged Cyril for Prince Hilarion in Princess Ida.

Oldham left the D'Oyly Carte company in 1922 to star in a great number of musicals and operettas during the 1920s at the Theatre Royal, Drury Lane and other West End theatres. His first musical was Whirled into Happiness at the Lyric Theatre, as Horace Wiggs, where his leading lady was his future wife, Winnie Melville. They married in 1923. She later joined the D'Oyly Carte Opera Company as a principal soprano for a single London season in 1929–1930. Oldham wrote, "The sheltered, almost student life of the D'Oyly Carte Opera Company gave place to the hard glitter and luxury of the West End theatre – a world of restaurants, supper parties, and all the trappings that went with London theatrical life between the two wars". Other musicals in which Oldham starred included Madame Pompadour (1923, as Rene), The Merry Widow (1923, as Camille), and Rose-Marie (1925, as Jim). In 1927, Oldham and Melville starred together in the European première of The Vagabond King, he as François Villon, and she as Katherine de Vaucelles. They separated in 1933, and she died in 1937.

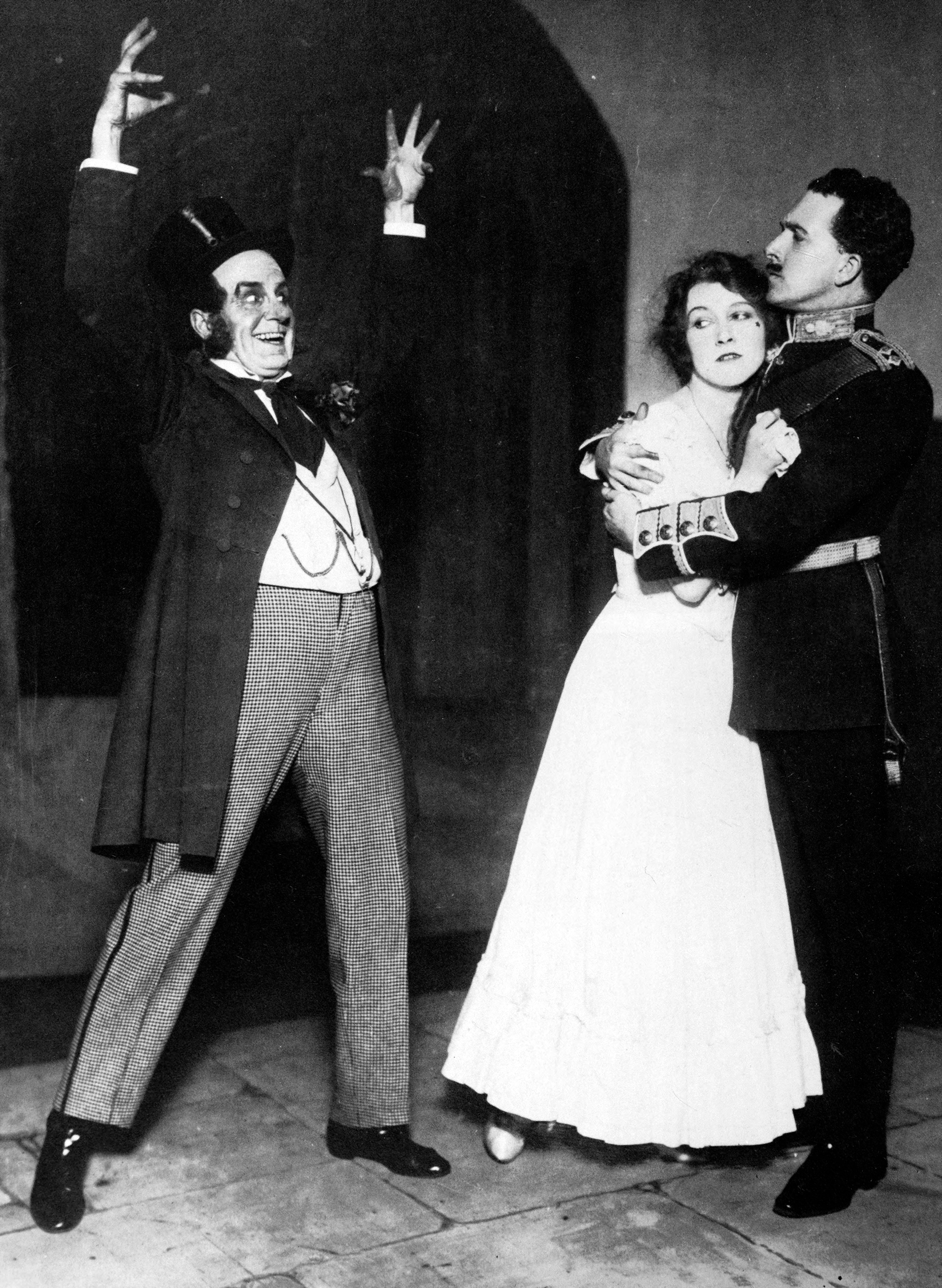
Henry Lytton, Elsie Griffin and Oldham in The Sorcerer

Oldham returned several times to D'Oyly Carte, appearing in the 1929–30 season and on tour in his old roles of Ralph, Frederic, Tolloller, Hilarion, Nanki-Poo, Fairfax, and Marco. In the 1934–35 season, he played these roles on the company's first major American tour in the 20th century. In 1936, during the company's season at Sadler's Wells, he played Hilarion, and he was leading tenor in the 1936–37 season, which included another long American tour. Oldham's presence was a condition demanded by the American promoters. During this tour he and Sylvia Cecil were excused by the company for one night to sing a programme of classical and popular favourites, including "Prithee, pretty maiden" from Patience, the evening before President Roosevelt's 2nd inauguration, at a party at the White House.

=== Later years ===
Oldham later played in many musicals and plays, including The Song of the Drum at Drury Lane, as Captain Anthony Darrell (1931). He appeared at the Royal Albert Hall as Chibiabos in Hiawatha in 1938, conducted by Malcolm Sargent. After 1948 he developed a career as a Lieder singer and lecture-recitalist and later as a character actor in non-musical plays. His last role in London was Dr. Stoner in the Agatha Christie play Verdict (1958). Between 1934 and 1957, he also appeared in several films.

In 1940, on 29 February, the character Frederic came of age, as described in The Pirates of Penzance, Act II. This was a significant date for any G&S tenor. In New York, the Gilbert and Sullivan Society journal, "The Palace Peeper", marked the event by publishing an original ode to Frederic, in which Oldham was honoured as the archetype of the romantic Frederic. A member of the Gilbert and Sullivan Society in London from 1924, Oldham was elected vice-president of the society in 1947.

During his last decade, Oldham lived in retirement in Hayling Island, Hampshire, but he often visited London. He acted as compère for the D'Oyly Carte company's last night revelries at the close of its 1961–62 London season at the Savoy Theatre. In September 1966 he appeared on the BBC radio programme Desert Island Discs. He died in Portsmouth in 1968, just before his 81st birthday.

== Recordings and films ==
Oh! Is There Not One Maiden Breast
Derek Oldham as Frederic in the 1920 His Master's Voice acoustic recording of The Pirates of Penzance

Oldham played leading tenor roles in nineteen full and abridged His Master's Voice Savoy opera recordings, as follows: Defendant in Trial by Jury (1928), Alexis in The Sorcerer (1933), Frederic in The Pirates of Penzance (1920, 1929 and 1931), the Duke of Dunstable in Patience (1930), Earl Tolloller in Iolanthe (1922 [part] and 1929), Hilarion in Princess Ida (1924 and 1932), Nanki-Poo in The Mikado (1926 and 1936), Richard Dauntless in Ruddigore (1924 and 1931), Colonel Fairfax in The Yeomen of the Guard (1920, 1928 and 1931) and Marco in The Gondoliers (1927 and 1931). He also made numerous recordings of songs, musicals and operettas.

He also appeared in several films between 1934 and 1957, including The Broken Rosary (1934), as Giovanni; Charing Cross Road (1935), as Jimmy O'Connell; Melody of My Heart (1936), as Joe Montfort, and Dangerous Exile (1957), as William.
