= Sacconi Quartet =

UK-based classical music string quartet

The Sacconi Quartet is a UK-based classical music string quartet founded in 2001 by four graduates of the Royal College of Music, London, UK. The Quartet has achieved widespread recognition, having given recitals in leading British concert halls and at music festivals in Britain and across Europe. They have also won several major prizes in string quartet and chamber music competitions. The Quartet is named for the outstanding twentieth-century Italian violin maker and restorer Simone Sacconi, who wrote The Secrets of Stradivari a reference work for violin makers.

== Members ==
The quartet retains its founding members, who are:

- Ben Hancox, violin
- Hannah Dawson, violin
- Robin Ashwell, viola
- Cara Berridge, 'cello

== About ==
Since its formation at the Royal College of Music in 2001, the Sacconi Quartet has established a secure and substantial reputation. The Quartet is recognised for its unanimous and compelling ensemble, performing with style and commitment and consistently communicating with a fresh and imaginative approach. Its four founder members demonstrate a shared passion for string quartet repertoire, infectiously reaching out to audiences with their energy and enthusiasm. The Quartet have enjoyed a highly successful international career, performing regularly throughout Europe, at London's major venues, in recordings and radio broadcasts. The Sacconi is Quartet in Association at the Royal College of Music and Associate Artist at the Bristol Old Vic Theatre. The Sacconi Quartet is renowned for its vigorous and individual approach to music-making. In 2008, the Quartet held the inaugural Sacconi Chamber Music Festival in Folkestone, Kent. Now in its fifth year, the festival is an established event in the cultural calendar and is expanding year on year with challenging programming and exciting collaborations. The Sacconi Quartet has performed at all the major London venues including Wigmore Hall, Kings Place, Cadogan Hall, Queen Elizabeth Hall, Purcell Room and Conway Hall. They have travelled extensively throughout the rest of the UK and Europe to venues including Bridgewater Hall in Manchester, Musikverein in Vienna, Muziekgebouw in Amsterdam, L'Auditori in Barcelona and Auditorio Nacional de Música in Madrid as well as many venues in Germany, Switzerland, Belgium, France, Finland, Norway and the Czech Republic. In 2008 the Sacconi made their debut at the Liceo de Cámara Madrid, and in 2009 at the Concerts du Midi, Brussels and the Festspiele Mecklenburg-Vorpommern in Germany. The Quartet also made their first visit to the Middle East in 2009, where they were invited by the British Council to give concerts and workshops in Jordan's capital city, Amman.

Highlights of the 2014/15 season include collaborations with Miloš Karadaglić, Ksenija Sidorova and the Vertavo Quartet as well as performances in Switzerland, Spain and across the UK, including returning to the Wigmore Hall. Highlights of recent seasons include collaborations with Pekka Kuusisto, Freddy Kempf, Mark Simpson and Lavinia Meijer, performances in Germany, Spain, Holland, the Quartet's debut in Italy and the completion of their second major project at Kings Place, performing the great piano quintets over two years with pianist Simon Crawford-Phillips. The Sacconi performed their 10th birthday celebratory concert at Kings Place to a sold-out hall.

In Summer 2015 the quartet embarked on an exciting new immersive project called HEARTFELT. A radical reinterpretation of Beethoven's iconic String Quartet in A minor opus 132, HEARTFELT pushed the boundaries of chamber music through combining sound, light and touch, for a truly unique performance in which audience members connected with each performer's heartbeat through holding robotic ‘hearts’. Developed in a unique collaboration with robotics and lighting designers and funded by Arts Council England, HEARTFELT received 4-star reviews from The Guardian and The Independent, and was described by the latter as “a powerful way to experience the visceral physicality of Beethoven’s profound thanksgiving”. www.heartfelt.org.uk

== Premieres and collaborations ==
To date the Quartet has given twenty world premières and three British premières, including quartets by György Kurtág, Robin Holloway, Paul Patterson, Timothy Salter, John Metcalf and Alun Hoddinott, and recently they performed as the solo string quartet on Paul McCartney's new song Come Home. The Sacconi Quartet has been joined on stage by many artists including Mark Padmore, Melvyn Tan, Andrew Marriner, Vladimir Ashkenazy, Guy Johnston, Alasdair Beatson, Tom Poster, Matthew Rose, Bellowhead’s Jon Boden and actor Timothy West. In 2006, baritone Roderick Williams and the Sacconi Quartet made the premiere recording of Gerald Finzi's 1921-22 song cycle By Footpath and Stile.

== Awards and recognition ==
- First Prize, Trondheim International String Quartet Competition, Norway, 2005.
- Kurtag Prize, Bordeaux International String Quartet Competition, France, 2005.
- First Prize in the Royal Over-Seas League Chamber Music Competition, UK 2005.
- Leverhulme Junior Fellows, Royal College of Music, UK.
- Second Prize, London International String Quartet Competition, UK, 2006.
- The Esterhazy Prize for the best performance of a Haydn quartet in the preliminary round, London International String Quartet Competition, UK, 2006.
- The Sidney Griller Award for the best performance of the three compulsory pieces in the preliminary round, London International String Quartet Competition, UK, 2006.
- Shortlisted for a Royal Philharmonic Society award, UK, 2006.
- Selected for representation by Young Concert Artists Trust (YCAT), UK, 2006.
- Awarded an Angel Award for outstanding performances in the Edinburgh International Festival by The Herald newspaper, Edinburgh, Scotland, UK, August 2006.

== Recordings ==
The Sacconi Quartet has its own, highly successful, record label. Sacconi Records is expanding by one or two releases each year. In 2011 a disc of Czech quartets was released which has received widespread critical acclaim and was tipped as a classical chart 'Hot Shot' by Classic FM. Their debut recording of Haydn's opus 54 quartets was praised in the press and both the Ravel and Haydn discs were featured in The Full Works programme on Classic FM. Their 2006 recording of Finzi's song cycle By Footpath and Stile with baritone Roderick Williams for Naxos was well received in all the national broadsheets and BBC Music Magazine.

- Haydn String Quartets opus 54: Sacconi Quartet on Sacconi Records (SACC101)
- Quartets by Ravel, Lalo and Turina: Sacconi Quartet on Sacconi Records (SACC102)
- Beethoven String Quartets opus 18, volume I: Sacconi Quartet on Sacconi Records (SACC103)
- Quartets by Dvorak, Smetana and Suk: Sacconi Quartet on Sacconi Records (SACC104)
- Gerald Finzi, Songs: Earth and Air and Rain/By Footpath and Stile/To a Poet: Roderick Williams (baritone), Iain Burnside (piano) and The Sacconi Quartet. The English Song Series 15. Naxos (2006).
