= Julián Robledo =

Argentine composer

Julián Robledo (1887–1940) was a composer best known for the song "Three O'Clock in the Morning". Robledo lived in Buenos Aires, Argentina in the early 1900s where he played piano in tango orchestras and composed some of the earliest published tangos. "Three O'Clock in the Morning" was published in the United States in 1919. The song was recorded by Paul Whiteman in 1922 and became one of the first 20 recordings in history to achieve sales of over one million records. The piece features prominently in the December 27, 1950 episode of radio's The Harold Peary Show.

== History ==
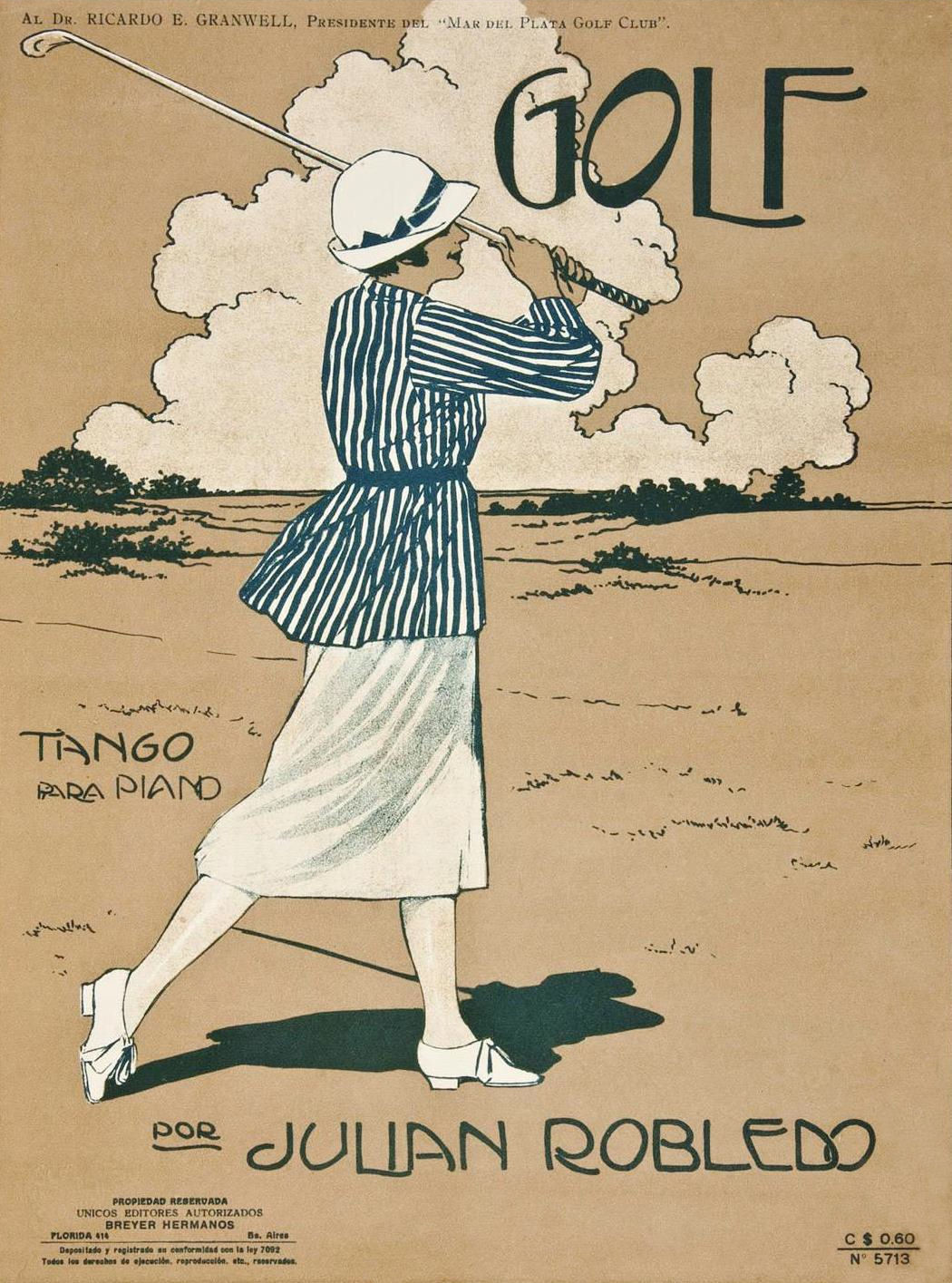
"Golf" - an early tango composed by Julián Robledo

Julián Robledo was born in Ávila, Castilla y León, Spain in 1887. He emigrated to Argentina in the early 1900s where he worked with some of the best known orchestras of the day. When the orquesta típica of Genaro Espósito was signed by the Victor record label in 1912, their first recording was the tango "Ya vengo", by Julián Robledo. Other tangos composed by Robledo include "La Pianola", "Golf' and “Chirulote”. Julián Robledo also played piano with the orchestras of Eleuterio Yribarren, recording on the labels Electra and Odeón.

Robledo composed "Three O'Clock in the Morning" in 1919. Lyrics were added by Dorothy Terriss in 1921, and the song created a sensation when it was performed in New York in the Greenwich Village Follies of 1921. Paul Whiteman released a recording on the Victor label in 1922, resulting in sales of over 3.5 million copies of the record, and over 1 million copies of the sheet music.

In Buenos Aires, Robledo was active in promoting and protecting the rights of musicians and composers. He was spokesperson for the "Federación de Profesores de Música" and was a founder of the "Comisión de Defensa de los Derechos de Autor."

Julián Robledo died in Buenos Aires, Argentina in 1940.
