= By Footpath and Stile =

Song cycle

By Footpath and Stile is a song cycle for baritone and string quartet by English composer Gerald Finzi (1901-1956) set to poems by Thomas Hardy (1840-1928). Composed between 1921 and 1922, it was first performed in 1923 and published in 1925.

== Description ==
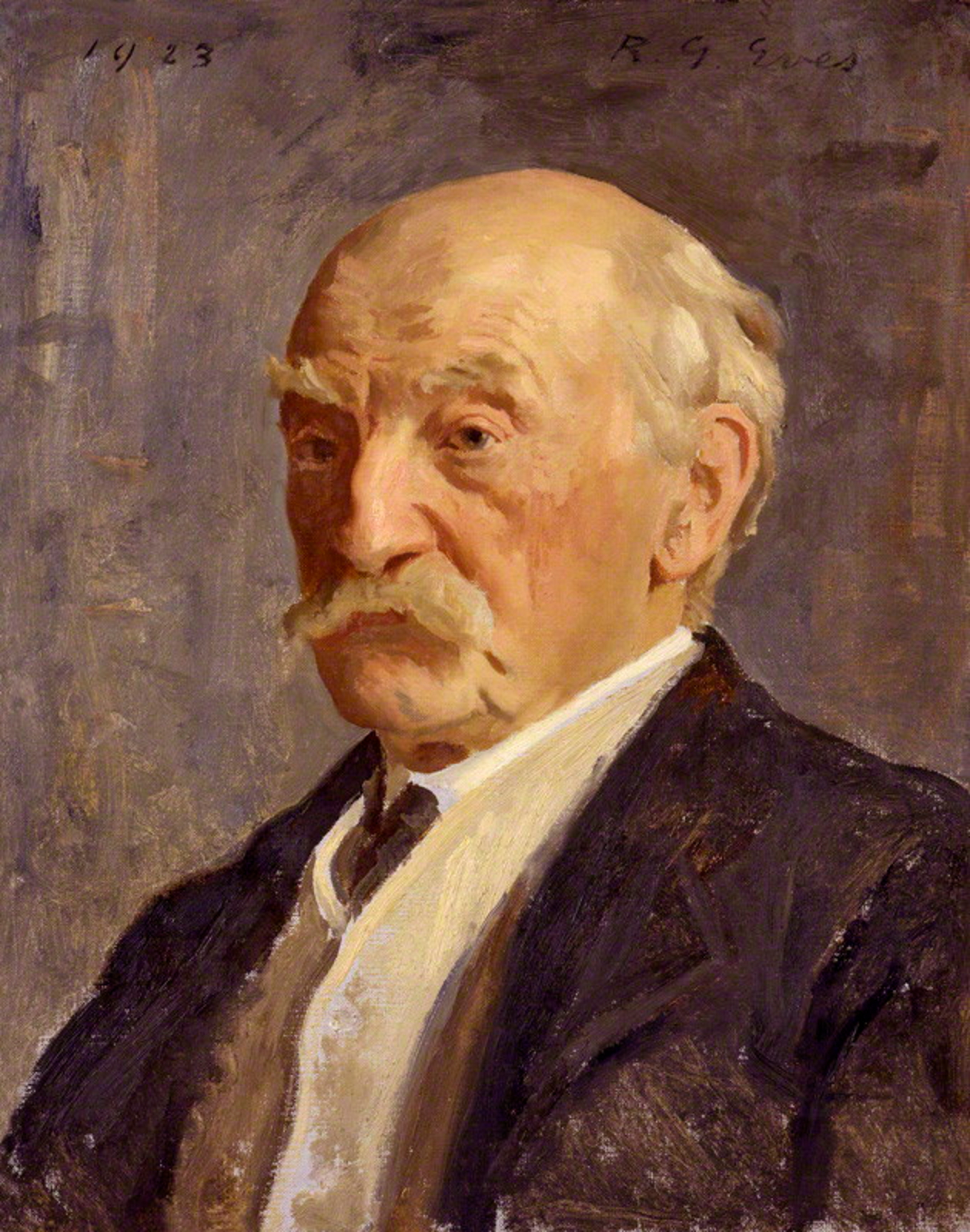
Thomas Hardy in 1923, the year By Footpath and Stile premiered

By Footpath and Stile consists of six settings of poems written by Thomas Hardy during and shortly after World War I. Its title is adapted from "I went by footpath and by stile", the opening line of the first of song in the cycle. The ordering of the poems in the song cycle, all of which deal with death, loss, separation, and the passing of time, is not chronological, but Finzi's own. The final poem, "Exeunt Omnes", recapitulates the themes in three of the previous poems in the cycle.

Sequence of the poems in the cycle and their publication dates:

1. "Paying Calls" (1917)
2. "Where the Picnic Was" (1914)
3. "The Oxen" (1919)
4. "The Master and the Leaves" (1919)
5. "Voices from Things Growing in a Churchyard" (1921, revised 1922)
6. "Exeunt Omnes" (1914)

A performance of the complete cycle, which is scored for solo baritone and string quartet, takes approximately 22 minutes.

== History ==
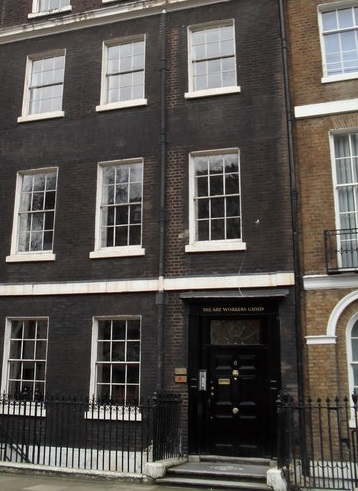
6 Queen Square, London where By Footpath and Stile premiered on 24 October 1923

By Footpath and Stile is the earliest of the six song cycles by Finzi set to poems by Thomas Hardy, who was Finzi's favourite poet. During the course of his career he set over fifty of Hardy's poems. Composed in 1921-1922, it was premiered on 24 October 1923 by the baritone Sumner Austin and the Charles Woodhouse String Quartet in a British Music Society concert at 6 Queen Square, London. The work received a repeat performance on 18 February 1927 in Liverpool, again in a British Music Society concert. The score was published as his Opus 2 in 1925 by Curwen & Sons at Finzi's own expense.

The reviews of the cycle's premiere were "all favourable and encouraging", according to Finzi's biographer, Diana McVeagh. A critic in The Musical Times reviewed the published score in 1926 and described it as "a highly interesting work" and went on to write: "It is true that the music is vitally influenced by Vaughan Williams, but the composer uses the idiom with imagination and sensitiveness." However, Finzi remained dissatisfied with the work. In 1934, he withdrew it from publication and had Curwen's plates and remaining stock destroyed. He also asked Curwen to withdraw three of his earlier songs which included "The Cupboard", a setting of a Robert Graves poem. In April 1934 Finzi wrote about the withdrawal in a letter to his friend Howard Ferguson: "They are all really bad works, though I may one day revise Footpath and Stile." In 1941, Finzi revised two of the songs from the cycle, "Paying Calls" and "The Oxen". That year he wrote in his personal catalogue of works that apart from those revised songs, "the original withdrawn edition should be utterly forgotten" and labelled it as a "premature publication".

In 1981, 25 years after Finzi's death, Boosey & Hawkes re-issued the full score of By Footpath and Stile with his 1941 revisions and edited by Howard Ferguson. The cycle did not receive its first commercial recording until 2006 when Roderick Williams and the Sacconi Quartet recorded it on the Naxos label. It was recorded again in 2012 by Marcus Farnsworth and the Finzi Quartet on the Resonus label. Resonus re-issued the recording in 2019.

== 21st-century critical reception ==
Critical reaction, based on the only two recordings (of 2006 and 2012), has been largely positive, while noting the composer's relative immaturity. Andrew Clements called the quartet writing "rather stodgy" and said that the vocal lines "only intermittently seem personal", but also said that the subject matter (death and transience) is totally characteristic of Finzi's later work. According to an anonymous writer for Boosey & Hawkes, "The music reflects a youthful composer’s intuitive response to poems which were themselves newly published but Finzi’s musical hallmarks are already evident, even if they are not as sophisticated in their presentation as in the songs which were to follow. The collection forms an important first milestone". Greg Keane called the cycle "precocious", and the musical idiom "an acquired taste", but said that the work stopped short of being "impossibly arty". Jeremy Dibble found the cycle more modal than many of Finzi's later works, and noted a debt to Vaughan Williams's 1909 cycle On Wenlock Edge (for tenor, piano and string quartet). Colin Anderson wrote, "By Footpath and Stile is word-setting and Nature-painting at its most-haunting; music of atmosphere and rapture". An anonymous critic in BBC Music Magazine called the cycle "striking", "impressive in Finzi's equable way", and "responding memorably to the cool-climate vividness of the poems".
