= Billy Merson =

British entertainer (1879–1947)

- Billy Merson as Platt in Whirled into Happiness
- Born: William Henry Thompson; 29 March 1879; Nottingham, England
- Died: 25 June 1947 (aged 68); Nottingham, England
- Occupations: Music hall singer and songwriter.

Billy Merson (born William Henry Thompson; 29 March 1879 – 25 June 1947) was an English music hall performer, comedian and songwriter.

== Biography ==
He was born in Nottingham. He began his career while working in a lace-making factory. He performed in the evenings in a duo with Bernard Whiteman, at first as "Whiteman and Thompson - Irish Comedians and Trapeze Performers", and later as "Snakella and Travella". With Whiteman, he toured Ireland and the north of England, and appeared in pantomimes. In 1904, they changed their name to "Keith and Merson". Merson was initially an acrobat and clown, and first played in London in 1905 under the character name "Ping-Pong". It took some time until he could make a living from his stage work. "For five or six years on the stage, I survived on a salary hardly enough to keep body and soul together", he said. The partnership with Whiteman ended in 1908.

Under the name Billy Merson, he made his solo West End debut in 1909, and thereafter featured in a range of revues, pantomimes, and other variety engagements. He wrote songs and sold some of his compositions to other performers, including Wilkie Bard and Harry Ford, before finding success with a song that he performed himself in pantomime, "The Spaniard That Blighted My Life", sung in a pseudo-operatic style. The song also became one of Al Jolson's first hits, in 1913, and a hit again when Jolson re-recorded it with Bing Crosby in 1947. Merson took Jolson to court over performing the song without authorisation; he lost on a technicality, and the costs of the legal action left him bankrupt. Other songs that Merson wrote include "The Photo of the Girl I Left Behind", and "Desdemonia".

With fellow music hall performer Charles Austin, he set up Homeland Films, and made several silent short films, including Billy's Spanish Love Spasm (1915), directed by W. P. Kellino. He also appeared in three films made in the DeForest Phonofilm sound-on-film process, Billy Merson Sings Desdemona, Billy Merson Sings Scotland's Whiskey (a satire on Sir Harry Lauder), and Billy Merson in a Russian Opera (all 1926-1927).

As a comedian he was often paired with George Formby Senior. He performed in revues, including Hullo America in 1918 with Elsie Janis and also featuring the London debut of Maurice Chevalier, who later wrote of Merson that he "was not only very funny, but he was fast on his feet as well and had a good baritone voice... This man had everything." He also appeared in Whirled into Happiness (1922), the operetta Rose-Marie in 1925, musical comedy, and plays. He was briefly chairman of the music hall at the Players' Theatre in London. In the 1930s he reverted to his old music hall act, dressed in eccentric costume and singing.

He died in Nottingham in 1947, aged 68.

== Selected filmography ==
- Billy's Spanish Love Spasm (1915)
- The Man in Possession (1915)
- The Only Man (1915)
- Sherlock Blake - The Terrible 'Tec (1916)
- The Show Goes On (1937)
- Riding High (1937)
