= Three O'Clock in the Morning =

Waltz composed by Julián Robledo

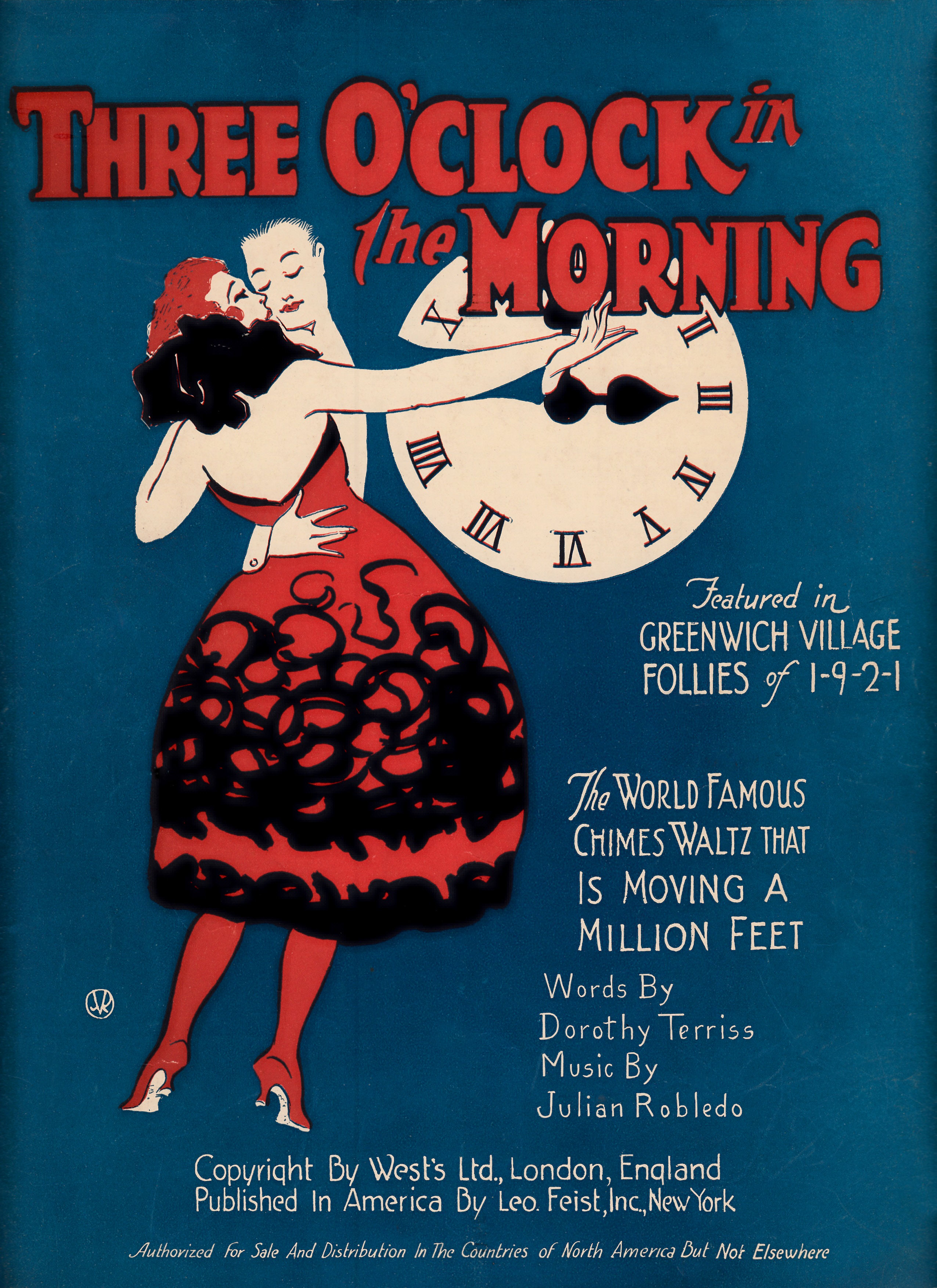
- 1921 sheet music cover

Single by Paul Whiteman and His Orchestra
- B-side: Oriental Fox Trot (Cui's "Orientale")
- Written: 1919
- Published: 1919
- Released: September 22, 1922
- Recorded: August 21, 1922
- Genre: waltz
- Length: 3:06
- Label: Victor
- Composer: Julián Robledo
- Lyricist: Dorothy Terriss

Audio track
- "Three O'clock In The Morning", performed by Paul Whiteman and his Orchestra: file; help

"Three O'Clock in the Morning" is a waltz composed by Julián Robledo that was extremely popular in the 1920s. Robledo published the music as a piano solo in 1919, and two years later Dorothy Terriss wrote the lyrics. Paul Whiteman's instrumental recording in 1922 became one of the first 20 recordings in history to sell more than 1 million copies.

== History ==
Julián Robledo, an Argentine composer born in Spain, published the music for "Three O'Clock in the Morning" in New Orleans in 1919. In 1920 the song was also published in England and Germany, and lyrics were added in 1921 by Dorothy Terriss (the pen name of Theodora Morse). The song opens with chimes playing Westminster Quarters followed by three strikes of the chimes to indicate three o'clock. The lyrics then begin: It's three o'clock in the morning, we've danced the whole night through.

This "Waltz Song with Chimes" created a sensation when it was performed in the final scene of The Greenwich Village Follies of 1921. In this performance Richard Bold and Rosalind Fuller sang the song while ballet dancers Margaret Petit and Valodia Vestoff rang the chimes. Frank Crumit recorded the song for Columbia Records in 1921, but its biggest success came in 1922 when Paul Whiteman released a recording on the Victor label, selling over 3.5 million copies of the record, and fueling the sale of over 1 million copies of the sheet music.

The song has been recorded by some of the most renowned orchestras of the 20th century, including Frank De Vol and his Orchestra (1950), Guy Lombardo and his Royal Canadians (1960), Mitch Miller and the Gang (1960), Bert Kaempfert and his Orchestra (1964), and Living Strings (1971). In 1925, it was the debut recording for Harry Snodgrass. The song also has become a jazz standard with notable recordings by Dizzy Gillespie (1953), Oscar Peterson (1956), Dexter Gordon (1962), Harry James (1965), and Thelonious Monk (1969).

The song was also repatriated to the home country of the composer, Argentina, where it was published as "Las Tres de la Mañana" by G. Ricordi & C. and interpreted as a tango vals by the orchestra of Enrique Rodriguez in 1946.

In 1949, The Billboard described "Three O'Clock in the Morning" as "originally a ribald drinking song that Dolly Morse changed into a ballad."

== In popular culture ==
F. Scott Fitzgerald references "Three O'Clock in the Morning" in chapter 6 of his book The Great Gatsby. The song is played at a party, and Fitzgerald uses it to reflect the thoughts of a character (Daisy) in the novel. "Three O’Clock in the Morning" is mentioned on page 317 of Robert Penn Warren's 1946 novel All the King's Men. "Three O'Clock in the Morning" has also appeared in many movies. Judy Garland sang the song in Presenting Lily Mars (1943). The song has also appeared in Margie (1946), That Midnight Kiss (1949), Belles on Their Toes (1952), The Eddy Duchin Story (1956), The Great Gatsby (1974), When Brendan Met Trudy (2000), and The Man Who Wasn't There (2001).

The song is also referred to in John Cheever's short story "Goodbye, My Brother", first published in the August 25, 1951, edition of The New Yorker. The song is playing when the unnamed narrator, a member of the Pommeroy family, arrives at the annual costume dance held at the club house on the island of Laud's Head, a fictional island off the coast of Massachusetts. The narrator explains that the theme of the party was to "come as you wish you were." The story's thematic structure relies heavily on ideas about nostalgia and a longing for a long-gone era.
