= Dream On (An Indian Lullaby) =

- Sheet music cover, 1922

Song
- Published: 1922
- Composer(s): Victor Herbert
- Lyricist(s): B.G. DeSylva

"Dream On (An Indian Lullaby)" is a popular song written by B.G. DeSylva with music composed by Victor Herbert. The song is a Cherokee mother's lullaby to her child. The lyrics as first written are:

When the red Indian sun
Bids his goodbye;
Mother sees Cherokee's sleeptime's nigh,
When the fast fading day leaves a gray sky,
Twilight comes, then she hums this lullaby;

Dream on, mother is holding you, Ah yah*, ah yah;
Dream on, night is enfolding you, Ah yah, ah yah;
Some fair silver canoe
Carries you through into Dreamland,
Over a blue lagoon
Where the crickets croon, Ah yah, ah yah.
Dream on, mother is holding you, Ah yah, ah yah;
Dream on, night is enfolding you, Ah yah, ah yah;
New moon slender and frail
Quickly will pale and be gone,
And you'll come back to me then in the rose of dawn.

- Indian for "bye-lo" pronounced Hey-ah.

The first commercial recording of "Dream On" was by Mario Chamlee (Brunswick 10158) in 1925.

== Bibliography ==
- DeSylva, B.G. (w.); Herbert, Victor (m.). "Dream On" (An Indian Lullaby), (Sheet music). New York: Harms (1922).
- Kaye, Joseph. Victor Herbert: The Biography of America's Greatest Composer of Romantic Music. Wrangell-Rokassowsky Press (2007).
