= Harry Graham (poet) =

British writer and soldier (1874–1936)

Jocelyn Henry Clive 'Harry' Graham (23 December 1874 – 30 October 1936) was an English writer. He was a successful journalist and later, after distinguished military service, a leading lyricist for operettas and musical comedies, but he is now best remembered as a writer of humorous verse in a style of grotesquerie and black humour.

== Life ==
=== Family and education ===
Graham was the second son of Sir Henry Graham, KCB (1842–1930), Clerk of the Parliaments, and his first wife, Lady Edith Elizabeth Gathorne-Hardy, who died two weeks after Harry's birth. Graham's elder brother Ronald Graham entered the diplomatic service, becoming Ambassador to Italy (1921–33). Graham was educated at Eton and the Royal Military College, Sandhurst.

=== Military career ===
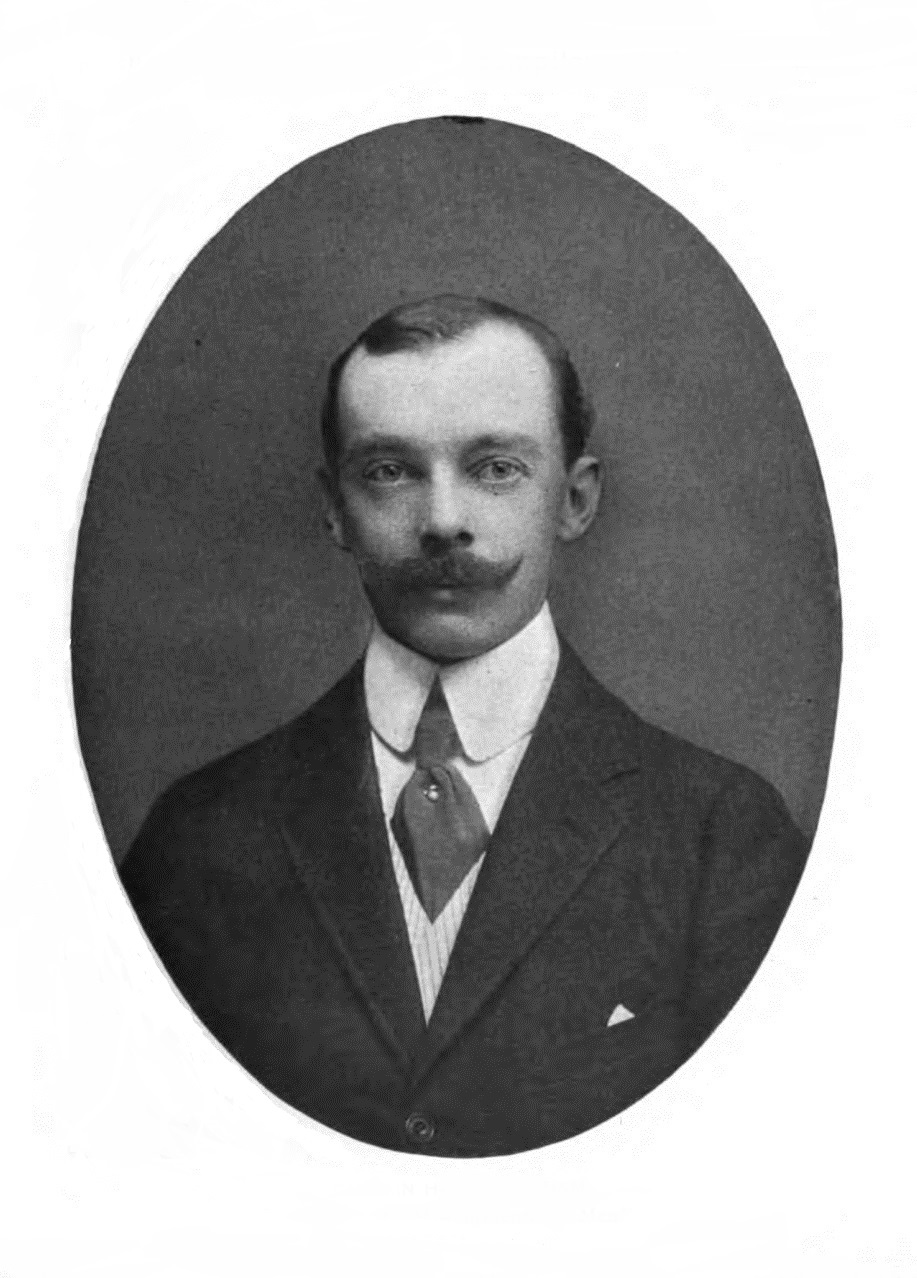
Graham, c. 1904

Graham was commissioned into the Coldstream Guards as a second lieutenant on 6 March 1895, and was promoted to lieutenant on 9 January 1898. From March 1899 to 1901 and again in 1902–1904 he served as aide-de-camp to Lord Minto, Governor-General of Canada. In the intervening year, he served in the Second Boer War in South Africa. He was promoted to captain (supernumerary) on 20 April 1901, and received a regular commission from his regiment in August 1902, as he returned to Canada. Graham kept a journal of his trip across Canada with Minto to the Klondike Gold Rush in the Yukon in 1900, called Across Canada to the Klondyke, which he later presented to Minto, and which was eventually published. Graham retired from the army in 1904, and became private secretary to the former Prime Minister, Lord Rosebery, 1904–06.

On the outbreak of the First World War in 1914, Graham rejoined the Coldstream Guards and served in France in the 40th and 5th divisions.

=== Marriage and later life ===
Graham was engaged to Ethel Barrymore, but they did not marry. He married Dorothy Villiers in 1910, and they had a daughter, Virginia Graham, who followed him as a writer, contributing many articles to Punch.

Graham died of cancer in London in 1936, aged 61. A memorial service for him was held in St Martin-in-the-Fields.

== Career as a writer ==
=== Light verse ===
His first published works appeared during his military career. In 1906, he became a full-time writer, as a journalist and author of light verse, popular fiction and history, including A Group of Scottish Women (1908).

Graham is best remembered for his series of cheerfully cruel Ruthless Rhymes, first published in 1898 under the pseudonym Col. D. Streamer, a reference to his regiment. These were described by The Times, in an editorial that compared him to Edward Lear, Lewis Carroll and W. S. Gilbert, as "that enchanted world where there are no values nor standards of conduct or feeling, and where the plainest sense is the plainest nonsense". The Oxford Dictionary of National Biography also compares his verse with that of W. S. Gilbert and suggests that his prose was an early influence on P. G. Wodehouse. Graham's other light verse exhibited a delight in language, and not only his native one, as in his response to the news that Wilhelm II, visiting Brussels, spoke at length with Baron de Hauteville, Director of the Congo Museum, in French, German and English: the poem began:

Guten Morgen, mon ami!
Heute ist es schönes Wetter!
Charmé de vous voir ici!
Never saw you looking better!

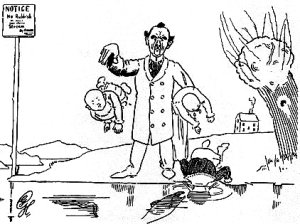
"Father heard his children scream" – illustration to the 1898 Ruthless Rhymes

An example of a Ruthless Rhyme is:

Father heard his children scream
So he threw them in the stream
Saying, as he drowned the third,
"Children should be seen, not heard!"

Graham's pleasure in word-play is illustrated in his poem on "Poetical Economy":

When I’ve a syllable de trop,
I cut it off, without apol.:
This verbal sacrifice, I know,
May irritate the schol.;
But all must praise my dev’lish cunn.

Who realise that Time is Mon.

Some of the Ruthless Rhymes involved Little Willie, a poetic personification of youthful mischief, whose gruesome acts of violence with indifferent or cheerfully inappropriate responses inspired readers to compose similar verses. The most common format of these poems was a four lines in trochaic tetrameter. Victor Hely-Hutchinson composed a series of song settings for the poems published as Ruthless Rhymes for Heartless Homes in 1945 and 1946.

When Grandmama Fell Off the Boat: The Best of Harry Graham is an anthology of Graham's verse (1986, Salem House). A 2nd edition was published by Sheldrake Press in 2009.

=== Lyricist and translator ===
During the war, Graham started to write lyrics for English operettas and musical comedies, including Tina (1915), Sybil (1916), the 1917 hit operetta The Maid of the Mountains and A Southern Maid (1920), and English adaptations of European operettas such as Whirled into Happiness (1922), Madame Pompadour (1923), The Land of Smiles (1931) and many others.

His best known lyrics were "You are my heart's delight", his English version of "Dein ist mein ganzes Herz", from The Land of Smiles, composed by Franz Lehár (and made famous by the popular tenor Richard Tauber), and "Goodbye", from his English adaptation of The White Horse Inn (originally "Adieu, mein kleiner Gardeoffizier" from Robert Stolz's operetta Die lustigen Weiber von Wien, a song which later achieved great popularity as sung by Josef Locke).

== Published works ==
- 1899: Ruthless Rhymes for Heartless Homes; words by Col. D. Streamer; illustrations by G. H. Obl. 8vo., 59 pp. London: Edward Arnold (both words and drawings are by Graham)

- Little Miss Nobody (1901)
- Ballads of the Boer War (1902)
- Baby's Baedeker (1902)
- Perverted Proverbs (1903)
- Misrepresentative Men (1904)
- Fiscal Ballads (1905)
- More Misrepresentative Men (1905)
- Verse and Worse (1905)
- A Song-Garden for Children (1906)
- Misrepresentative Women (1906)
- Familiar Faces (1907)
- A Group of Scottish Women (1908)
- Deportmental Ditties (1909)
- The Mother of Parliaments (1910)
- The Bolster Book (1910)
- Lord Bellinger An Autography (1911)
- Canned Classics (1911)
- The Perfect Gentleman (1912)
- The Motley Muse (1913)
- Splendid Failures (1913)
- The Cinema Star (1914)
- The Complete Sportsman (1914)
- State Secrets (1914)
- Tina (1915)
- Sybil (1916)
- The Maid of the Mountains (1917)
- Rhymes for Riper Years (1919)
- Biffon and His Circle (1919)
- Our Peg (1919)
- A Southern Maid (1920)
- A Little Dutch Girl (1920)
- The Lady of the Rose (1921)
- Whirled into Happiness (1922)
- Head over Heels (1923)
- Madame Pompadour (1923)
- The World we Laugh in (1924)
- Our Nell (1924)
- The Buried Cable (or Dirty Work at the Crossroads) (1924)
- Toni (1924)
- Orange Blossom (1924)
- Betty in Mayfair (1924)
- Cleopatra (1925)
- Riquette (1925)
- The Grand Duchess (1925)
- Katja the Dancer (1925)
- Clo-Clo (1925)
- The Last of the Biffins (1925)
- Merry Molly (1926)
- My Son John (1926)
- The Blue Mazurka (1926)
- Strained Relations (1926)
- Lady Mary (1928)
- By Candle Light (1928)
- The World's Workers (1928)
- Hunter's Moon (1929)
- Adams Apples (1930)
- More Ruthless Rhymes for Heartless Homes (1930)
- The Good Companions (1931)
- Laiting in Waiting (1931)
- White Horse Inn (1931)
- The Land of Smiles (1931)
- Viktoria and her Hussar, Palace Theatre (1931)
- Casanova (1932)
- Rise and Shine (1932)
- Roulette (1932)
- Doctor Orders (1932)
- The Biffin Papers (1933)
- Happy Families (1934)
- The Private Life of Gregory Gorm (1936)

Posthumous publication

- 1984: Across Canada to the Klondyke; edited and with an introduction by Frances Bowles. Toronto: Methuen ISBN 0-458-98240-7 (A travel diary)

Anthology

- 1986: When Grandmama Fell off the Boat: the best of Harry Graham inventor of ruthless rhymes; with an introduction by Miles Kington. (Methuen Humour Classics.) London: Methuen ISBN 0-413-14150-0
  - --do.--1988, Harper Collins
  - --do.--2009, Sheldrake Press
