= Whirled into Happiness =

Musical by Robert Stoltz and Harry Graham

- St. John and Melford as Florence and the bogus Lord Brancaster
- Music: Robert Stolz
- Lyrics: Harry Graham
- Book: Harry Graham
- Basis: Der Tanz ins Glück by Stolz, Robert Bodanzky and Bruno Hardt-Warden
- Productions: 1922 West End

Whirled into Happiness is a musical comedy with music by Robert Stolz, and book and lyrics by Harry Graham, adapted from Stolz's Der Tanz ins Glück, with a libretto by Robert Bodanzky and Bruno Hardt-Warden. The work, billed as a "musical farce", was presented in London in 1922.

== History ==
The musical was staged in London by George Edwardes Ltd, a company controlled by the financier James White after the death of its founder George Edwardes. The piece opened at the Lyric Theatre in Shaftesbury Avenue on 18 May 1922 and ran for 246 performances, closing on 16 December 1922. The production was taken on tour in the provinces, with Mai Bacon from the original cast, and Derek Oldham, Winnie Melville, George Gregory and Bert Weston. The J. C. Williamson company presented a production that toured Australia in 1924–25.

Walls and Bacon as Horridge and Delphine

Billy Merson as Platt

A revised version of the show was staged in New York in 1925, under the title Sky High, and ran for 217 performances. Der Tanz ins Glück was also adapted into Italian as Dance la Fortuna and French as Danse vers le bonheur.

The work was adapted into the 1951 film Dance Into Happiness.

== Roles and original London cast ==
- Matthew Platt – Billy Merson
- Horace Wiggs – Austin Melford (replaced by Derek Oldham from 3 July 1922)
- Florence Horridge – Lily St. John (Margaret Campbell from 3 July; Winnie Melville from 3 September)
- Albert Horridge – Tom Walls
- Delphine de Lavilliere – Mai Bacon
- Mrs Horridge – Frances Weatherall
- Duke of Dulchester – Hastings Lynn
- Duchess of Dulchester – Gladys Hirst
- Lord Brancaster – Reginald Palmer
- Lily – Wynne Bronte
- Antoine – Frank Atkinson

== Synopsis ==
Setting: London

Horace Wiggs, a hairdresser's assistant, visits the Majestic music hall where, owing to a striking facial resemblance, the front of house attendant, Matthew Platt, mistakes him for the Marquess of Brancaster, an intimate friend of one of the Majestic's stars, Delphine de Lavalliere. Horace is shown into the private box reserved for Brancaster and catches the eye of Florence Horridge, who is having a surreptitious night out with some girl friends. Platt introduces Florence to Horace, but their tête-à-tête is interrupted by her father, Albert Horridge, a nouveau-riche hatter. He has visited the Majestic because of his strong interest in Delphine. Horridge is at first indignant to find his daughter in such a place and alone with an unknown young man, but he is quickly won over when he is told that the young man is Lord Brancaster, son and heir of the Duke of Dulchester. He invites the supposed marquess to a party that evening at the Horridges' villa in the suburb of Crouch End. Horridge later invites Delphine to perform at the party. She readily accepts on learning that Lord Brancaster is to be present, as she feels that he has been neglecting her.

At the party, all goes well until Horridge bids Platt ring the Duke to tell him that his son is engaged to Florence. Delphine has immediately recognised that Horace is not Lord Brancaster, but refrains from exposing him. The imposture is revealed when the Duke and Duchess arrive, along with the real Lord Brancaster. Horace returns to work at the hairdressing establishment, but after a sequence of farcical comings and goings there is a happy ending with Florence and Horace united.

== Critical reception ==
London reviews were uniformly enthusiastic: In The Play Pictorial, B. H. Findon praised "the delightful strain of melody that runs through the piece … the charming dances … the merry humours of Billy Merson and Tom Walls, the vocal accomplishment of Lily St. John and Austin Melford, the diablerie of Mai Bacon and the excellent all-round interpretation … a really delightful entertainment." In The Manchester Guardian, Ivor Brown commented that the music was in the best Viennese traditions, but "naturalisation papers have been taken out for the humour … all-British clowning." The Observer wrote, "As musical comedy plots go, it is brilliant. The chief people in the cast are extremely good." Reviewing the touring production, however, Neville Cardus wrote: "The bulk of the score is sheer revue. … It is rather sad to find Mr. Derek Oldham, with his pleasant voice and tasteful manner, thrown away on fustian."
