= Leila Megàne =

Welsh opera singer

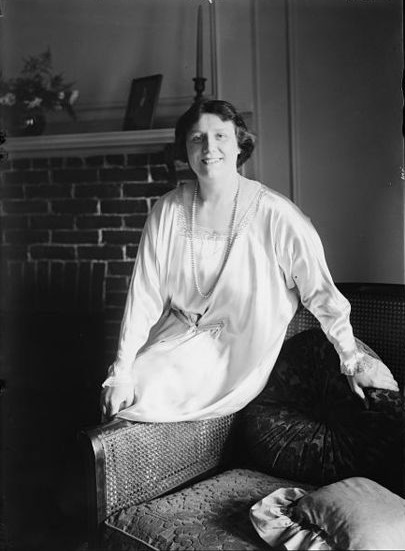
Leila Megàne

Leila Megane singing Pistyll y Llan, composed by her husband T. Osborne Roberts (1926)

Leila Megàne (5 April 1891 – 2 January 1960) was a Welsh mezzo-soprano opera singer.

Born Margaret Jones in Bethesda, Wales, she married T. Osborne Roberts (1879–1948), a composer. She spent a career touring numerous cities in Europe and once in New York.

== Career ==
During her career the future Leila Megane would start music lessons from a young age and made first solo appearance at the age of 16, and then entered the Eisteddfod in Beaumaris, Anglesey and in 1910, she won first prize singing the Welsh song 'Gwraig y pysgotwr' (Eurgain), with Thomas Price (1857-1925), her future husband T. Osborne Roberts had been adjudicating the event. She also featured in the Eisteddfod in Colwyn Bay and came first in a field of 50 competitors.

The fame brought the attention of George Power who enrolled her to the Royal Academy of Music in London; it was the future Prime minister David Lloyd George who helped her to travel to France for singing lessons with the famous Jean de Reszke who encouraged her to adopt the name 'Leila Megáne'. She had gained a 2-year contract to sing the Massenet in the Opéra-Comique, Paris. The dress she had worn in the Paris opera house is now on show at the national museum, St. Fagans, Cardiff, south Wales.

Leila had entertained injured soldiers at the beginning of World War I in France; her fame brought attention from prominent politicians and among them Lord Balfour, Bonar Law and Sir Winston Churchill. Later in her career under the direction of Henry Wood she regularly sang in (the former) Queen's Hall for a period just over 8 years. Later on she signed up for a tour around Europe; she'd sang in Milan and Moscow, then in 1923 she was invited to sing in the Metropolitan Opera House, New York, it was in New York she'd married T. Osborne Roberts.

Leila Megáne had a rich, mature, contralto voice, and her performances were characterised by much warmth. Among the items which she recorded circa 1920-25 are selections from French opera (sung in French), works by Handel, Welsh songs, and Elgar's Sea pictures, with the composer himself conducting the performance.

— Huw Williams, Dictionary of Welsh Biography

On 11 October 1922, she made the first complete recording of Sir Edward Elgar's Sea Pictures with Elgar himself conducting. On 12 November 1945, she gave her farewell concert in Pwllheli Town Hall. After the death of her husband, she married a second time in 1951 to a Mr. William Hughes, someone she had previously performed with in many concerts.

Since the 1956 Eisteddfod in Pwllheli, there has been a scholarship in her name was for amateur Welsh singers. She died at her home Melin Rhydhir, Efailnewydd, near Pwllheli in 1960.

== Recordings ==
- Various composers: Elgar, T Osborne Roberts, Leila Megane Sain SCD2316

The following are compilations that include performances by Megane.

- Bantock "Lament of Isis" from Songs of Egypt Bantock: Historical Recordings Dutton Laboratories CDLX7043
- Elgar, Sea Pictures Unidentified Orchestra, Edward Elgar The Elgar Edition GEMMCDS 9951–5 (Pavilion Records)
- T. Osborne Roberts "Pistyll y llan" Darlun Fy Mam Sain SCDC2109

== Books ==
- James, E W (1997). "Osborne Druan!: Gohebiaeth R. Williams Parry a Leila Megane, Taliesin 99". Taliesin: 32–52. ISSN 0049-2884.
- Jones, Ilid Anne (2001). Leila Megane 1891–1960 – Anwylyn Cenedl [Darling of a nation]. Llanrwst: Gwasg Carreg Gwalch. ISBN 0-86381-743-2.
- Jones, Ilid Anne (30 June 2023). Leila Megane: Ei Dawn a'i Stori [Her talent and her story]. Llanrwst, Wales: Gwasg Carreg Gwalch. ISBN 9781845279158.
- Lloyd-Ellis, Megan (1979). Hyfrydlais Leila Megane. Llandysul: Gomer Press. ISBN 978-0850888515. Archived from the original on 9 November 2021.
