= Geneviève Ward =

American singer

Geneviève Ward DBE
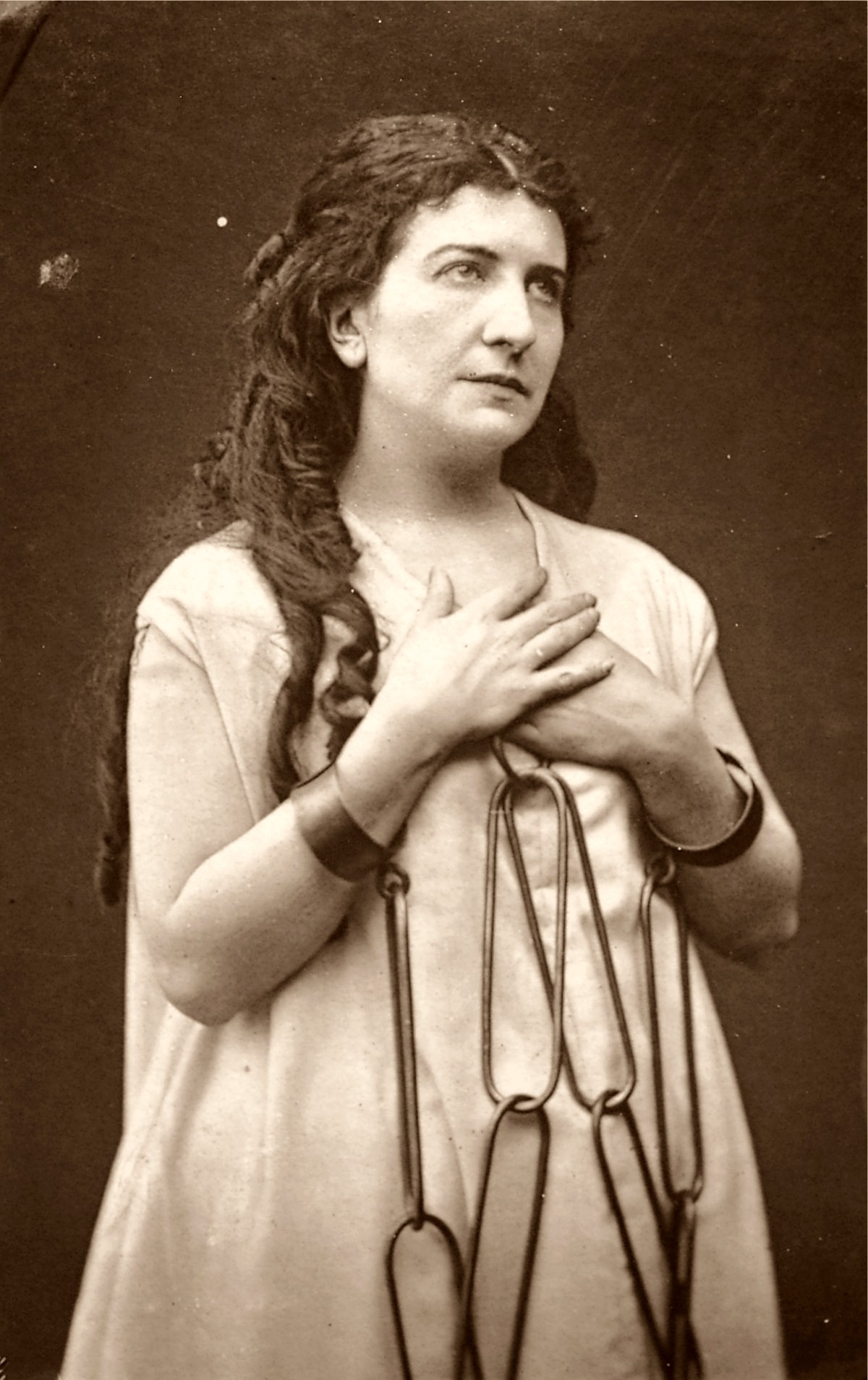
- Born: Lucy Geneviève Teresa Ward; 27 March 1837; New York City, United States
- Died: 18 August 1922 (aged 85); Hampstead, London, England
- Other name: Countess de Guerbel
- Occupation: Actress

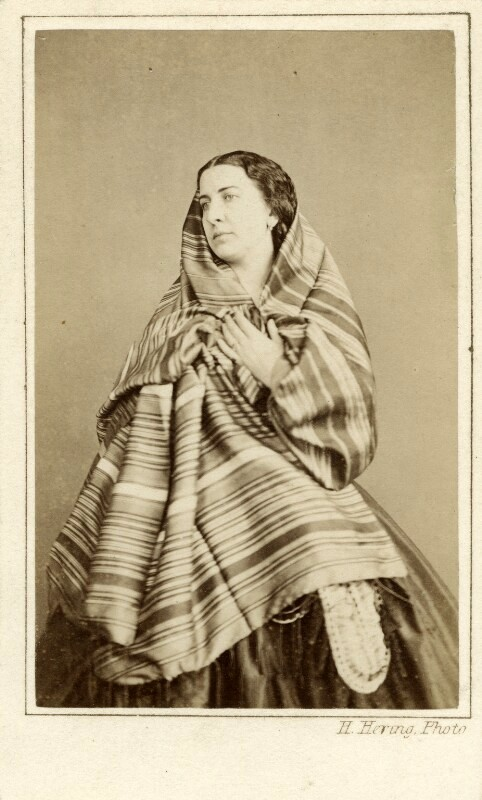
Geneviève Ward circa 1860

Lucy Geneviève Teresa Ward, Countess de Guerbel, DBE (27 March 1837 – 18 August 1922), often known, albeit inaccurately, as Dame Geneviève Ward, was a United Kingdom-based American-born (later Russian by marriage) soprano and actress. She was appointed Honorary Dame Commander of the Order of the British Empire on her 84th birthday in 1921.

== Life and career ==
Ward was born in New York City to Colonel Samuel Ward, and his wife, Lucy. She was the granddaughter of Gideon Lee, a former mayor of New York City. At the age of three she accompanied her parents to Europe. She began to display a preference for the arts, and devoted herself by turns to the study of painting, sculpture, and music. By degrees, music absorbed her entirely, and her proficiency on the piano attracted attention.

On 10 November 1856, at age 19, she married a Russian count, Constantine de Guerbel. After a few years' stay in Europe, the family returned to New York, and soon afterward made the acquaintance of Henriette Sontag, who encouraged Ward to study singing. When the Ward family returned to Europe, Sontag gave Geneviève a letter of introduction to the composer Rossini. In 1862, after Ward's last role in La Traviata, she retired due to vocal difficulties. Ward later became a stage actress, noted for dramatic roles. She toured Australia as an actress from December 1883 to November 1885.

== Later years ==
She published a volume of reminiscences, Before and Behind the Curtain in 1918.

== Death ==
Ward died of heart disease at her home in Hampstead on 18 August 1922, aged 85.
