= 1903 in music =

This is a list of notable events in music that took place in the year 1903.

== Specific locations ==
- 1903 in Norwegian music

== Events ==
- January 1 – The French government awards the Cross of Chevalier de la Légion d'honneur to Claude Debussy.
- January 3 – Alexander Glazunov's Symphony No. 7 "Pastorale" in F major, Op.70, and the orchestral suite "From the Middle Ages", suite in E major for orchestra Op.79 are premiered. The composer conducts the works at the annual Russian Symphony Concerts at Saint Petersburg.
- January 16 – Reinhold Gliere's Symphony No 1 in E-flat major, Op. 8, premiers in Moscow.
- January 28 – Ernani, an opera by Giuseppe Verdi, receives its first New York performance at the Metropolitan Opera.
- January – The New York Philharmonic Society dispenses with having a regular music director due to declining sales. Walter Damrosch leaves, and the next three seasons are handled by guests conductors.
- February 11 – Anton Bruckner's unfinished 9th Symphony is posthumously premiered in Vienna. Te Deum substitutes unfinished last movement of the symphony.
- February 23–March 8 – George Enescu conducts the world premieres of three of his works, the Suite No. 1 for orchestra, op. 9, in C major, and the two Romanian Rhapsodies, op. 11, in A major and D major, as part of a concert at the Romanian Athenaeum in Bucharest.
- March 21 – Ermanno Wolf-Ferrari's oratorio La Vita Nuova premieres in Munich.
- April 30 – Victor cuts its first Red Seal recordings. Soprano Ada Crossley records music at the Cornegie Hall studio, New York City.
- May 5 – Samuel Coleridge-Taylor's trilogy The Song of Hiawatha receives its first American performance as Charles E. Knauss conducts the Orpheus Oratorio Society in Easton, Pennsylvania.
- September 9 – Samuel Coleridge-Taylor's sacred cantata The Atonement, Op. 53 receives its first performance at the Hereford Festival in Hereford, England.
- September – Frederick Delius marries Jelka Rosen.
- October 8 – Carl Nielsen's overture Helios premieres in Copenhagen, the composer conducting.
- October 13 – Victor Herbert's Babes in Toyland premieres.
- October 14 – The Apostles by Edward Elgar receives its world premiere at the Birmhingham Festival in England.
- November 22 (St Cecilia's Day) – The newly-enthroned Pope Pius X issues his motu proprio, Tra le sollecitudini, promoting the use of traditional music, such as Gregorian chant, in Roman Catholic church services. It prohibits the regular use of orchestral instruments and the use of female singers and restricts contralto and soprano parts to boys, thus finally ending the role of the castrato.
- November 23 – Enrico Caruso makes his debut with the Metropolitan Opera, New York, singing the role of the Duke of Manrua in Rigoletto.
- November 25 – Soprano Olive Fremstad debuts at the Metropolitan Opera, New York, as Sieglinde in Die Walküre.
- unknown dates
  - Enrico Caruso makes first records for the Victor Talking Machine Company.
  - Mississippi John Hurt begins performing.
  - Nicholas Laucella joins the Pittsburgh Symphony Orchestra
  - Charles W. Clark is the first American to give a concert at the Paris National Conservatoire of Music, an honor that had not been given to an American in seventy years of those concerts.

== Published popular music ==
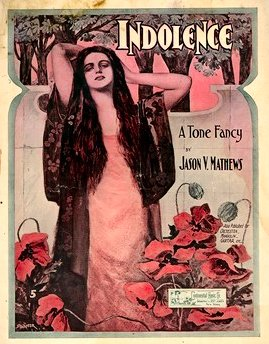
- "Always In The Way" w.m. Charles K. Harris
- "Always Leave Them Laughing When You Say Goodbye" w.m. George M. Cohan
- "Are We To Part Like This?" w.m. Harry Castling & Charles Collins
- "Anona" w.m. Vivian Grey
- "Bedelia" w. William Jerome m. Jean Schwartz
- "The Beer That Made Milwaukee Famous" w.m. Dan McAvoy
- "The Burning of Rome" by E. T. Paull
- "By The Sycamore Tree" w. George V. Hobart m. Max Hoffmann
- "Congo Love Song" w.m. Bob Cole & J. Rosamond Johnson
- "Daisy Donahue" w. James O'Dea m. Robert J. Adams
- "Dear Old Girl" w. Richard Henry Buck m. Theodore F. Morse
- "Dear Sing Sing" Schwartz
- "Down At The Old Bull And Bush" w.m. Florrie Forde
- "Flowers Of Dixieland" w. Edgar Smith m. J. Rosamond Johnson
- "General Hardtack On Guard" w.m. Dave Reed Jr
- "Good-bye, Eliza Jane" w. Andrew B. Sterling m. Harry Von Tilzer
- "Hamlet Was A Melancholy Dane" w. William Jerome m. Jean Schwartz
- "Hannah!" by Joseph Farrell
- "He Was A Sailor" w. William Jerome m. Jean Schwartz
- "Hurrah For Baffin's Bay" w. Vincent Bryan m. Theodore F. Morse
- "I Can't Do The Sum" w. Glen MacDonough m. Victor Herbert
- "I Could Love You In A Steam Heat Flat" w. Vincent Bryan m. J. B. Mullen
- "I Never Could Love Like That" Bowman, Johns
- "Ida, Sweet As Apple Cider" w. Eddie Leonard m. Eddie Munson
- "I'm A Jonah Man" w.m. Alex Rogers
- "I'm On The Water Wagon Now" w. Paul West m. John Walter Bratton
- "I'm Thinking Of You All The While" Reed Jnr
- "I'm Wearing My Heart Away For You" w.m. Charles K. Harris
- "In The Village By The Sea" w. Andrew B. Sterling m. Stanley Crawford
- "Indolence" Jason Mathews
- "Is Your Mother In, Molly Malone?" w.m. A. J. Mills & George Everard
- "It Takes the Irish to Beat the Dutch" w. Edward Madden m. Theodore F. Morse
- "It Was The Dutch" w. Vincent Bryan m. J. B. Mullen
- "It's The Man In The Sailor Suit" w. Fred C. Farrell m. Theodore F. Morse
- "Jack Tar March" by John Philip Sousa
- "Julie" w. William Jerome m. Jean Schwartz
- "Lazy Moon" w. Bob Cole m. J. Rosamond Johnson
- "Like A Star That Falls From Heaven" w. Arthur Lamb m. Kerry Mills
- "Little Yellow Bird" w.m. C. W. Murphy & William Hargreaves
- "The Maid Of Timbucktoo" w. James Weldon Johnson m. Bob Cole
- "The March Of The Toys" m. Victor Herbert
- "Main Gazebo" Chris Praetorius
- "Mary Ellen" Bryan, Lemonier
- "Melody Of Love" w. Tom Glazer m. H. Engelmann
- "The Military Band" m. Victor Herbert
- "Moriaty" w. Charles Horwitz m. Fred V. Bowers
- "Mother O' Mine" w. Rudyard Kipling m. Frank E. Tours
- "My Cosy Corner Girl" w. Charles Noel Douglas m. John Walter Bratton
- "My Hula Lula Girl" by Jean Schwartz & William Jerome
- "My Little Coney Isle" w. Andrew B. Sterling m. Harry Von Tilzer
- "My Little Creole Babe" w.m. Maude Nugent
- "My Little 'Rang Outang" w. Edward Madden m. Theodore F. Morse
- "Navajo" w. Harry H. Williams m. Egbert Van Alstyne
- "An Old Man's Darling" w.m. Fred Murray & George Everard
- "Only a Dream of the Golden Past" w. Alfred Bryan m. Stanley Crawford
- "Out Where the Breakers Roar" w. Harlow Hyde m. H. W. Petrie
- "Over the Pilsner Foam" w. Vincent Bryan m. J. B. Mullen
- "Palm Leaf Rag" by Scott Joplin
- "Please Mother, Buy Me a Baby" w.m. Will D. Cobb & Gus Edwards
- "The Saftest of the Family" w. Harry Lauder & Bobry Beaton m. Harry Lauder
- "Save It for Me" w. James Weldon Johnson m. Bob Cole
- "Spring Beautiful Spring" m. Paul Lincke
- "Summer Breeze March & Two-Step" by James Scott
- "There's a Little Street in Heaven That They Call Broadway" w. Jack T. Waldron & A. Baldwin Sloane m. A. Baldwin Sloane
- "Toyland" w. Glen MacDonough m. Victor Herbert
- "The Toymaker's Shop" m. Victor Herbert
- "Two Eyes Of Blue" w. George H. Taylor m. Leslie Stuart
- "Two Eyes Of Brown" w. Edward Madden m. Stephen Howard
- "Under A Panama" w. Vincent Bryan m. J. B. Mullen
- "Under the Anheuser Bush" w.m. Andrew B. Sterling & Harry Von Tilzer
- "Up In A Coconut Tree" w. Edward Madden m. Theodore F. Morse
- "Upper Broadway After Dark" w. Edward Gardinier m. Maurice Levi
- "When I'm Away From You Dear" w.m. Paul Dresser
- "The Woodchuck Song" w. Robert Hobart Davis m. Theodore F. Morse
- "The Wreck Of The Old '97" m. Henry C. Work
- "Your Dad Gave His Life For His Country" w. Harry J. Breen m. T. Mayo Geary
- "You're The Flower Of My Heart, Sweet Adeline" w. Richard H. Gerard m. Henry W. Armstrong

== Recorded popular music ==
- "Always In The Way" (w.m. Charles K. Harris)
  – Byron G. Harlan on Edison Records
- "Any Rags?" (w.m. Thomas S. Allen)
  – Arthur Collins on Edison
- "The Arrow And The Song" (w. Henry Wadsworth Longfellow m. Michael William Balfe)
  – Herbert Goddard on Victor Records
- "Badinage" (m. Victor Herbert)
  – Edison Grand Concert Band on Edison
- "Bedelia" (w. William Jerome m. Jean Schwartz)
  – George J. Gaskin on Columbia Records
  – Edward M. Favor on Columbia
  – Billy Murray on Edison
- "The Beer That Made Milwaukee Famous" (w.m. Dan McAvoy)
  – Edward M. Favor on Edison
  – Dan W. Quinn on Victor
- "Blaze Away" (m. Abe Holzmann)
  – banjos Vess L. Ossman & Bill Farmer on Victor
- "Blaze Away" (m. Abe Holzmann)
  – Kendle's Band on Victor
- "By The Sycamore Tree" (w. George V. Hobart m. Max Hoffmann)
  – Harry Macdonough on Edison
  – Bob Roberts on Columbia
  – Billy Murray on Victor
- "Come Down Ma' Evenin' Star" (w. Robert B. Smith m. John Stromberg)
  – Mina Hickman on Victor
- "Congo Love Song" (w.m. Bob Cole & J. Rosamond Johnson)
  – Harry Macdonough on Edison
  – Mina Hickman on Victor
- "Could You Be True To Eyes Of Blue If You Looked Into Eyes Of Brown?" (w.m. Will D. Cobb & Gus Edwards)
  – Harry Macdonough on Victor
- "The Country Girl" (w. Stanislaus Stange m. Julian Edwards)
  – Vesta Victoria on Gramophone Records
- "Didn't Know Exactly What To Do" (w. Frank Pixley m. Gustav Luders)
  – Edward M. Favor on Edison
- "Down On The Farm" (w. Raymond A. Browne m. Harry Von Tilzer)
  – Franklyn Wallace on Edison
- "Flowers Of Dixieland" (w. Edgar Smith m. J. Rosamond Johnson)
  – Franklyn Wallace on Edison
- "The Gambling Man(1)" (w. William Jerome m. Jean Schwartz)
  – Silas Leachman on Victor
- "Good-bye, Eliza Jane" (w. Andrew B. Sterling m. Harry Von Tilzer)
  – Arthur Collins on Edison
- "Hamlet Was A Melancholy Dane" (w. William Jerome m. Jean Schwartz)
  – Edward M. Favor on Edison
- "He Ought To Have A Tablet In The Hall of Fame" (w. Arthur L. Robb m. John Walter Bratton)
  – Edward M. Favor on Edison
- "He Was A Sailor" (w. William Jerome m. Jean Schwartz)
  – Collins & Harlan on Edison
- "Heidelberg Stein Song" (w. Frank Pixley m. Gustav Luders)
  – Harry Macdonough on Edison & Victor
- "Hiawatha" (w. James O'Dea m. Neil Moret)
  – Edison Grand Concert Band on Edison
  – Harry Macdonough on Edison
  – Metropolitan Orchestra on Victor
  – Sousa's Band on Victor
- "Hurrah For Baffin's Bay" (w. Vincent Bryan m. Theodore F. Morse)
  – Collins & Harlan on Edison
  – Dan W. Quinn on Victor
- "I Could Love You In A Steam Heat Flat" (w. Vincent Bryan m. J. B. Mullen)
  – Harry West on Edison
- "I Like You, Lil, For Fair" (Ade, Loraine)
  – Billy Murray on Victor
- "I Never Could Love Like That" (Bowman, Johns)
  – Billy Murray on Victor
- "I Want To Be A Lidy" (w. George Dance m. George Dee)
  – Clarke's Band Of Providence on Victor
- "I Wonder Why Bill Bailey Don't Come Home" (w.m. Frank Fogerty, Matt C. Woodward & William Jerome)
  – Arthur Collins on Victor & Edison
- "I'll Wed You In The Golden Summertime" (w. Alfred Bryan m. Stanley Crawford)
  – John H. Bieling & Harry Macdonough on Victor
- "I'm A Jonah Man" (w.m. Alex Rogers)
  – Dan W. Quinn on Victor
  – Arthur Collins on Edison & Victor
- "I'm Thinking Of You All The While" (Reed Jnr)
  – Billy Murray on Victor
- "I'm Wearing My Heart Away For You" (w.m. Charles K. Harris)
  – Harry Macdonough & John H. Bieling on Victor
- "In Silence" (w. Sydney Rosenfeld m. A. Baldwin Sloane)
  – Arthur Clifford on Edison
- "In The City Of Sighs And Tears" (w. Andrew B. Sterling m. Kerry Mills)
  – J. W. Myers on Victor
- "In the Good Old Summer Time" (w. Ren Shields m. George "Honey Boy" Evans)
  – Haydn Quartet on Victor
  – S. H. Dudley & Harry Macdonough with Sousa's Band on Victor
  – Harry Macdonough on Victor
- "In The Sweet Bye And Bye" (w. Vincent P. Bryan m. Harry Von Tilzer)
  – J. Aldrich Libbey on Edison
- "In The Village By The Sea" (w. Andrew B. Sterling m. Stanley Crawford)
  – Byron G. Harlan on Edison
- "It Takes The Irish To Beat The Dutch" (w. Edward Madden m. Theodore F. Morse)
  – Billy Murray on Victor Monarch
- "It Was The Dutch" (w. Vincent Bryan m. J. B. Mullen)
  – Collins & Harlan on Edison
- "Juanita" (w. Caroline Norton m. trad Sp.)
  – Haydn Quartette on Victor
- "Julie" (w. Wiliam Jerome m. Jean Schwartz)
  – Edward M. Favor on Edison
- "Just For Tonight(1)" (w.m. Frank O. French)
  – Albert C. Campbell on Edison
- "The Leader Of The Frocks And Frills" (w. Robert B. Smith m. Melville Ellis)
  – Clarke's Band of Providence on Victor
- "Like A Star That Falls From Heaven" (w. Arthur Lamb m. Kerry Mills)
  – Joe Natus on Victor
- "The Maid Of Timbucktoo" (w. James Weldon Johnson m. Bob Cole)
  – Harry Macdonough on Edison
- "Massa's In De Cold Ground" (w. m. Stephen Collins Foster)
  – Edison Male Quartette on Edison
- "Meet Me When The Sun Goes Down" (w. Vincent Bryan m. Harry von Tilzer)
  – William H. Thompson (singer) on Victor
- "Melody Of Love" (w. Tom Glazer m. H. Engelmann)
  – Edison Symphony Orchestra on Edison
- "The Message Of The Rose" (w. Will A. Heelan m. Leo Edwards)
  – George Seymour Lenox on Edison
- "The Message Of The Violet" (w. Frank Pixley m. Gustav Luders)
  – J. W. Myers on Victor
- "Mighty Lak' A Rose" (w. Frank Lebby Stanton m. Ethelbert Nevin)
  – Arthur Clifford on Edison
- "Moriaty" (w. Charles Horwitz m. Fred V. Bowers)
  – Collins & Harlan on Edison
- "My Cosy Corner Girl" (w. Charles Noel Douglas m. John Walter Bratton)
  – Henry Burr on Columbia
  – Harry Macdonough on Edison
- "My Little Coney Isle" (w. Andrew B. Sterling m. Harry von Tilzer)
  – Harry Tally on Edison
- "My Little 'Rang Outang" (Madden, Morse)
  – Billy Murray on Victor
- "My Own United States" (w. Stanislaus Stange m. Julian Edwards)
  – J. W. Myers on Victor
- "My Sulu Lulu Loo" (w. George Ade m. Nat D. Mann)
  – Clarke's Band Of Providence on Victor
- "Only A Dream Of A Golden Past" (w. Alfred Bryan m. Stanley Crawford)
  – Franklyn Wallace on Edison
- "Out Where The Breakers Roar" (w. Harlow Hyde m. H. W. Petrie)
  – Frank C. Stanley on Edison
- "Please Mother, Buy Me A Baby" (w.m. Will D. Cobb & Gus Edwards)
  – Byron G. Harlan on Victor & Edison
- "Pretty Little Dinah Jones" (w.m. J. B. Mullen)
  – Harry Macdonough on Edison
- "R-E-M-O-R-S-E" (w. George Ade m. Alfred G. Wathall)
  – Joe Natus on Victor
- "Sal" (w.m. Paul Rubens)
  – Madge Crichton with piano Landon Ronald on Gramophone & Typewriter Records
- "Sammy" (w. James O'Dea m. Edward Hutchinson)
  – Harry Macdonough on Edison
- "Sammy" (w. James O'Dea m. Edward Hutchinson)
  – Henry Burr on Columbia
- "Sly Musette" (w. Sydney Rosenfeld m. A. Baldwin Sloane)
  – Harry Macdonough on Edison
- "Tell Me Dusky Maiden" (w. James Weldon Johnson & Bob Cole m. J. Rosamond Johnson)
  – S. H. Dudley & Harry Macdonough on Victor
- "Then I'd Be Satisfied With Life" (w.m. George M. Cohan)
  – Edward M. Favor on Edison
- "There's One In A Million Like You" (w. Grant Clarke m. Jean Schwartz)
  – Walter Van Brunt on Edison
- "Two Eyes Of Blue" (w. George H. Taylor m. Leslie Stuart)
  – Harry Macdonough on Victor
  – Mina Hickman on Victor
- "Under The Bamboo Tree" (w.m. Bob Cole & J. Rosamond Johnson)
  – Mina Hickman on Victor
- "Up In A Coconut Tree" (Madden, Morse)
  – Billy Murray on Victor Monarch
- "Upper Broadway After Dark" (w. Edward Gardinier m. Maurice Levi)
  – Edward M. Favor on Edison
- "The Vacant Chair" (w. Henry S. Washburne m. George Frederick Root)
  – Byron G. Harlan on Edison
- "Wait At The Gate For Me" (w. Ren Shields m. Theodore F. Morse)
  – J. W. Myers on Victor
- "What's The Matter With The Moon Tonight?" (w. Sydney Rosenfeld m. A. Baldwin Sloane)
  – Arthur Clifford on Edison
- "When The Fields Are White With Cotton" (w. Robert F. Roden w. Max S. Witt)
  – Franklyn Wallace on Edison
- "When We Were Two Little Boys" (w. Edward Madden m. Theodore F. Morse)
  – Billy Murray on Victor

== Classical music ==
- Hakon Borresen – Romance for Cello and Piano/Orchestra
- Vincent d'Indy - Choral varié, for saxophone/viola and orchestra, Op. 55,
- Frederick Delius – Sea Drift
- Edward Elgar – The Apostles (oratorio)
- George Enescu –
  - Piano Suite No. 2 in D major, Op. 10 ("Des cloches snores")
  - Sérénade lointaine for piano, violin, and cello
- Joseph Holbrooke – The Bells
- Joseph Jongen – Sonata for Violin and Piano No. 1
- Carl Nielsen – Helios Overture
- Ludolf Nielsen – Symphony No.1, Op.3
- Vítězslav Novák – Slovak Suite
- Maurice Ravel – String Quartet in F
- Max Reger – Variations and Fugue on an Original Theme, Op.73
- Nicolai Rimsky-Korsakov – Christmas Eve (suite)
- Albert Roussel - Résurrection, Prelude for orchestra Op. 4
- Alexander Scriabin
  - 8 Études for piano, Op. 42
  - Le divin poème (The Divine Poem), Symphony No. 3 in C minor
- Charles Villiers Stanford – String Quintet No.1, Op.85 (dated April 21, Malvern)
- Richard Strauss - Symphonia domestica
- Francesco Paolo Tosti – Seconda mattinata
- Ángel Gregorio Villoldo – El Choclo
- Alexander von Zemlinsky – Die Seejungfrau

== Opera ==
- Eugen d'Albert – Tiefland premiered on 15 November at the Neues Deutsches Theater, Prague
- Thomas O'Brien Butler – Muirgheis (first Irish opera) produced in Dublin on 7 December
- Ernest Chausson – Le roi Arthus, first performance at the Theatre de la Monnaie, Brusseles on 30 November
- César Cui – Mam'zelle Fifi premiers in Moscow on 17 January
- Vincent d'Indy – L'étranger, premiers at the Theatre de la Monnaie in Brussels on 7 January
- Edmund Eysler – Bruder Straubinger premiered on 20 February at the Theater an der Wien, Vienna
- Ermanno Wolf-Ferrari – Le donne curiose premiers at the Residenztheater in Munich on 27 November
- Umberto Giordano – Siberia premiers at Teatro alla Scala in Milan on 19 December
- Alexander Gretchaninov – Dobrynya Nikitich premiered on 27 October at the Bolshoi Theater in Moscov
- Scott Joplin – A Guest of Honor (lost)
- Mykola Lysenko – Taras Bulba premiered on 20 December in Kiev
- Juan Manén – Giovanni di Napoli
- John Knowles Paine – Azara premiered in a concert version on 7 May in Boston
- Emile Pessard – L'Épave premiered on 17 February at the Bouffes-Parisiens, Salle Choiseul, Paris
- Sergei Vassilenko – Skazaniye o grade velikom Kitezhe i tikhom ozere Svetoyare ("Tale of the Great City of Kitezh and the Quiet Lake Svetoyar") first staged version is produced in Moscow (originally a cantata, Op. 5)

== Dance ==
- January 12 - The Devil's Forge is produced by the Alhambra Ballet, London. Choreography by Lucia Cormani, the new prima ballerina, and music by George Byng.
- May 7 - Carmen, a new ballet by Alhambra Ballet premiers in London. Lucia Cormani choreographs music by Georges Bizet.

== Musical theater ==
- Babes In Toyland Broadway production opened at the Majestic Theatre on October 13 and ran for 192 performances
- The Cherry Girl London production opened at the Vaudeville Theatre on December 29 and ran for 215 performances
- The Duchess of Dantzig London production opened at the Lyric Theatre on October 17 and ran for 236 performances
- The Earl and the Girl London production opened at the Adelphi Theatre on December 10 and transferred to the Lyric Theatre on September 12, 1904, for a total run of 371 performances
- The Fisher Maiden (Music: Harry von Tilzer) Broadway production opened at the Victoria Theater on October 5 and ran for 32 performances. Starring Al Shean, George A. MacFarlane, Edna Bronson, Bessie Tannehill, Dorothy Jardon and Frances Cameron.
- In Dahomey Broadway production opened at the New York Theatre on February 18 and ran for 53 performances
- In Dahomey London production opened at the Shaftesbury Theatre on May 16 and ran for 251 performances
- The Jersey Lily Broadway production opened at the Victoria Theater on September 14 and ran for 24 performances
- Madame Sherry Vienna production
- Madame Sherry London production opened at the Apollo Theatre on December 23
- The Medal and the Maid London production opened at the Lyric Theatre on April 25
- My Lady Molly London production opened at Terry's Theatre on March 14
- The Orchid London production opened at the Gaiety Theatre on October 26 and ran for 559 performances
- A Princess of Kensington London production opened at the Savoy Theatre on January 22 and ran for 115 performances
- The Rogers Brothers In London Broadway production opened at the Knickerbocker Theatre on September 7 and ran for 64 performances
- The School Girl London production opened on May 9 at the Prince of Wales Theatre and ran for 333 performances.
- Three Little Maids Broadway production opened at Daly's Theatre on September 1 and ran for 130 performances
- The Wizard of Oz Broadway production opened at the Majestic Theatre on January 21 and ran for 293 performances

== Published Writings ==
- Hermann Abert – Robert Schumann
- Hector Berlioz – Lettres inédites de Hector Berlioz à Thomas Gounet
- Vsevolod Cheshikhin – History of Russian Opera from 1674 to 1903
- Theodor von Frimmel – Ludwig van Beethoven
- Francis Williams Galpin – The Whistles and Reed Instruments of the American Indians
- George Grove – The Life and Letters of George Grove
- Rupert Hughes – Music Lovers' Encyclopedia (final version published 1912)
- Tobias Matthay – The Act of Touch in All its Diversity (piano practice)
- Alphonse Mustel – L'Orgue-Expressif ou Harmonium
- Julius Friedrich Sachse – The Music of the Ephrata Cloister
- G. Schirmer – The Piano Teacher's Guide
- Auguste Tolbecque – L'art du luthier

== Births ==
- January 4 – Carroll Gibbons, bandleader and composer (d. 1954)
- January 6 - Maurice Abravanel - Greek conductor (d. 1993)
- January 10 - Jean Paul Morel - French conductor (d. 1975)
- January 19
  - Boris Blacher - Chinese conductor (d. 1975)
  - Ervin Nyiregyházi - Jungarian pianist (d. 1987)
- January 22 – Robin Milford, English composer and educator (d. 1959)
- February 6 – Claudio Arrau, Chilean pianist (d. 1991)
- February 10 – Abel Meeropol ('Lewis Allan'), American lyricist (d. 1986)
- February 11 – Hans Redlich, Austrian composer and musicologist (d. 1968)
- February 12 – Todd Duncan, American baritone, first Porgy in Porgy and Bess (d. 1998)
- February 15 – Marie-Thérèse Gauley, French opera singer prominent at the Opéra-Comique (d. 1992)
- March 10 – Bix Beiderbecke, jazz musician (d. 1931)
- March 28 – Rudolf Serkin, Czech pianist of Russian parents (d. 1991)
- April 3 – Bubber Miley, jazz trumpeter (d. 1932)
- April 5 – Jimmy Campbell, songwriter (died 1967)
- April 10 – Herbert Graf, Austrian opera producer (d. 1958)
- April 17
  - Nicolas Nabokov, Russian composer (d. 1978)
  - Gregor Piatigorsky, Russian cellist (d. 1976)
- April 21 – Issy Bonn, singer and actor (d. 1977)
- May 3 – Bing Crosby, US singer and actor (d. 1977)
- May 12
  - Lennox Berkeley, composer (d. 1989)
  - Verna Osborne, soprano (d. 2006)
- May 20 – Jerzy Fitelberg, composer (d. 1951)
- May 26 – Bob Hope, English-born US actor, comedian and singer (d. 2003)
- May 28 – Walter Goehr, German composer (d. 1960)
- June 4 – Yevgeny Mravinsky, Russian conductor and pianist (d. 1988)
- June 6 – Aram Khachaturian, Armenian composer and conductor (d. 1978)
- June 15 – Huldreich Georg Früh, Swiss composer (d. 1945)
- June 18 – Jeanette MacDonald, US singer and actress (d. 1965)
- June 26 – St. Louis Jimmy Oden, blues singer (d. 1977)
- July 3
  - Dick Robertson, US singer (d. 1944?)
  - Daid Webster, Scottish opera administrator (d.1971)
- July 4 – Peeters, Belgian composer and organist (d. 1986)
- July 10 – Helen Pickens of the Pickens Sisters US singing group
- July 16 – Carmen Lombardo, Canadian singer, composer and saxophonist (d. 1971)
- August 4 – Helen Kane, US singer (d. 1966)
- August 17 – Abram Chasins, American composer and pianist (d. 1987)
- August 20 – António Fortunato de Figueiredo, conductor (d. 1981)
- August 23 – William Primrose, Scottish violinist (d. 1982)
- September 6 – Pál Kadosa, Hungarian composer and pianist (d. 1983)
- September 11 – Theodor Adorno, German musician and philosopher (d. 1969)
- September 15 – Roy Acuff, Country and Western singer (d. 1992)
- October 1 (probable) – Vladimir Horowitz, pianist (d. 1989)
- October 10 – Vladimir Dukelsky aka Vernon Duke, composer (d. 1969)
- October 16
  - Lena Machado, singer (d. 1974)
  - Big Joe Williams, blues guitarist (d. 1982)
- October 19 – Vittorio Giannini, neoromantic American composer (d. 1966)
- October 29 – Yvonne Georgi, ballet dancer and choreographer (d. 1975)
- November 6 – Asaf Messerer, Soviet dancer and ballet master (d. 1992)
- December 5 – Johannes Heesters, all-round entertainer (d. 2011)
- December 12 – Francisco Curt Lange, German musicologist
- December 17 – Ray Noble, bandleader, composer and arranger (d. 1978)
- date unknown – Caterina Jarboro, operatic soprano (d. 1986)

== Deaths ==
- January 28
  - Augusta Holmès, French composer, 55
  - Robert Planquette, French composer, 54
- January 31 – Meyer Lutz, conductor and composer, 73
- February 2 – Marc Burty, music teacher and composer, 75
- February 17 – Joseph Parry, organist and composer, 61
- February 22 – Hugo Wolf, Austrian composer, 62 (syphilis)
- February 23 – Friedrich Grützmacher, cellist, 70
- March – Eugène Cormon, French librettist, 92
- March 5 – Thomas Ryan, viola and clarinet player, 75
- March 14 – Ernest Legouvé, opera librettist (born 1807)
- March 19 – Pista Dankó, "gypsy" bandleader and composer, 44
- April 1 – Amelia Chambers Lehmann, songwriter (born 1838)
- April 10
  - Heinrich Bellermann, music theorist, 71
  - Enderby Jackson, pioneer of the British brass band, 76
- May 1 – Luigi Arditi, violinist, conductor and composer, 80
- May 9 – Giuseppe Cremonini, operatic tenor, 36
- May 15 – Sibyl Sanderson, operatic soprano, 38 (pneumonia)
- June – Constance Bache, pianist, composer and music teacher, 57
- June 29 – Rentarō Taki, Japanese pianist and composer, 23 (tuberculosis)
- July 27 – Lina Sandell, Swedish poet and hymn-writer 70
- July 28 – Rosine Stoltz, French mezzo-soprano 88
- September 4 – Hermann Zumpe, conductor and composer, 53
- September 28 – Samuel A. Ward, organist and composer, 55
- November 28 – Jules Levy (musician), Cornetist and composer, 65
- December 12 – Christian Johansson, ballet dancer and teacher, 86
- December 20 – Kornél Ábrányi, pianist and composer, 81
