= Matrix number =

Record label/runout coding

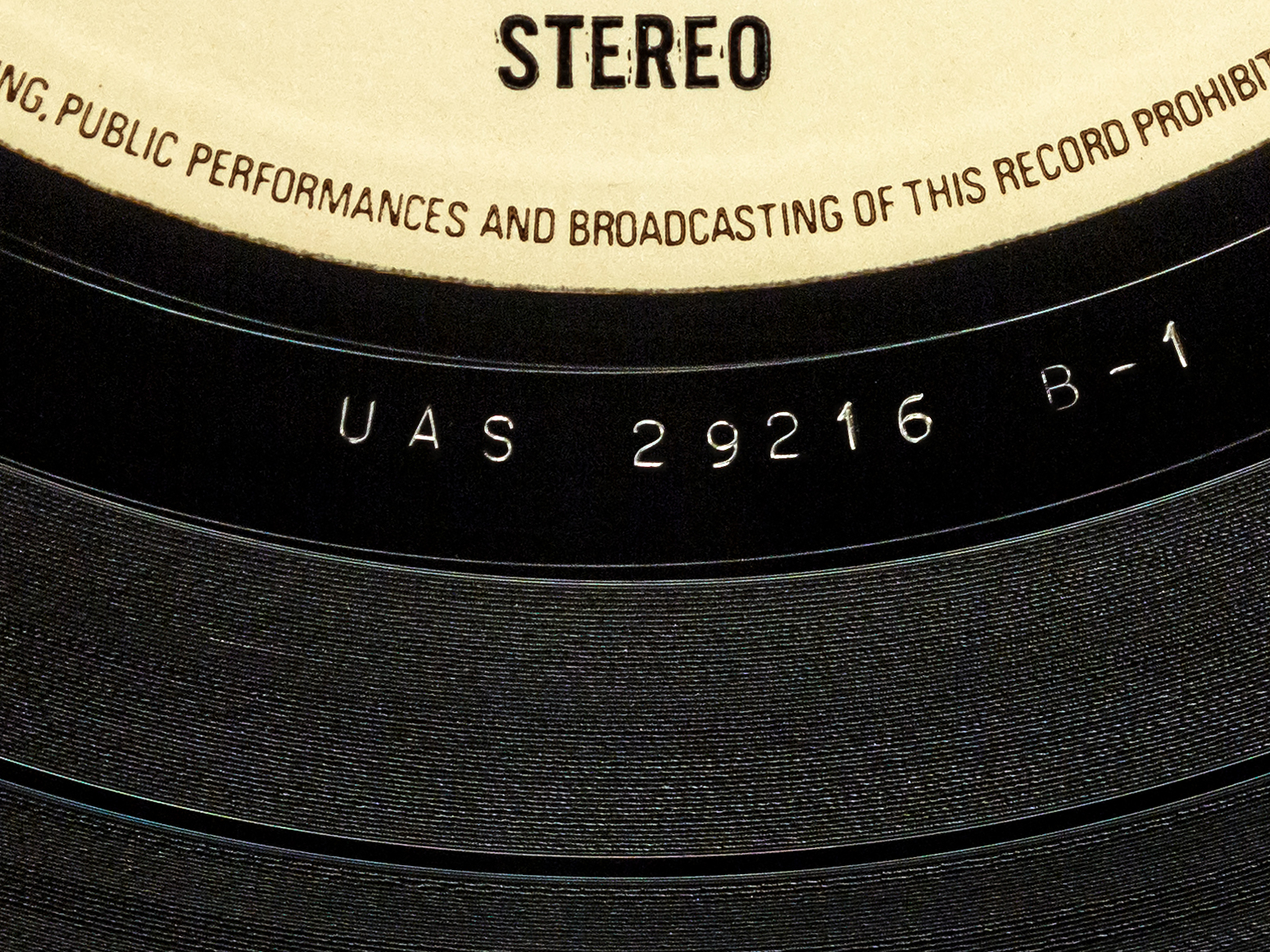
Stamped matrix number on a vinyl album with the film score for Diamonds Are Forever

A matrix number is an alphanumeric code (and on occasion, other symbols) stamped or handwritten (or a combination of the two) into the run-out groove area of a phonograph record. This is the non-grooved area between the end of the final band on a record's side and the label, also known as the run-off groove area, end-groove area, matrix area, or "dead wax".

== Industry usage ==
A matrix number is intended for the internal use of the record manufacturing plant, but they are also studied and documented by record collectors, as they can sometimes provide useful information about the edition of the record.

There are two parts of the matrix number to be considered: the main number, which is usually printed on the label as well, and extra information which can include a cut or take number. Matrix numbers can refer to any of these elements, or all of them combined. The inscription area may also contain record plant codes or logos, the initials or signature of the disc cutting engineer, and cutting or copyright dates, among other things.

Matrix and catalog numbers

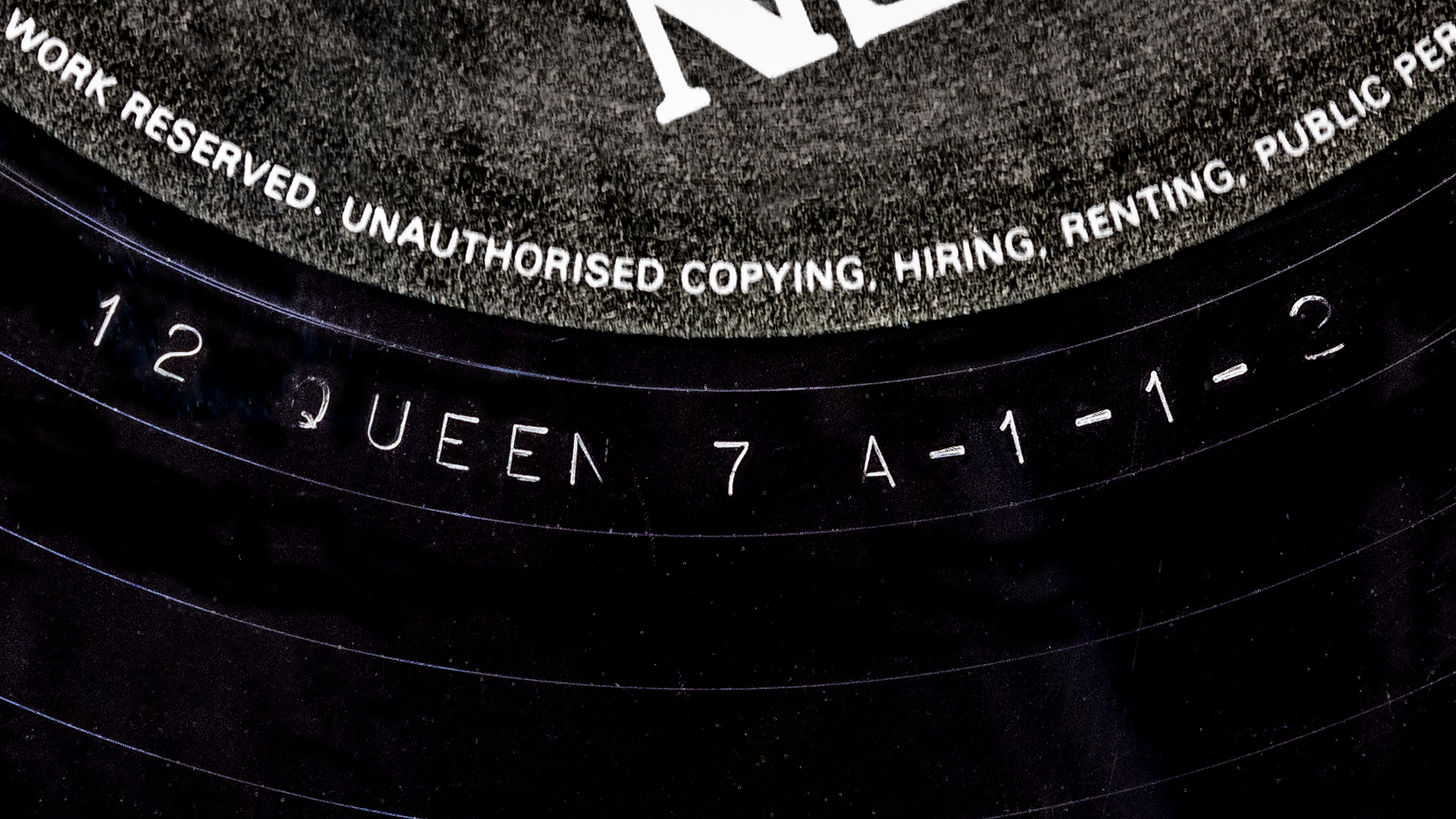
The stamped matrix number on the 1986 vinyl Maxi single, A Kind Of Magic, includes the name of the group performing it.

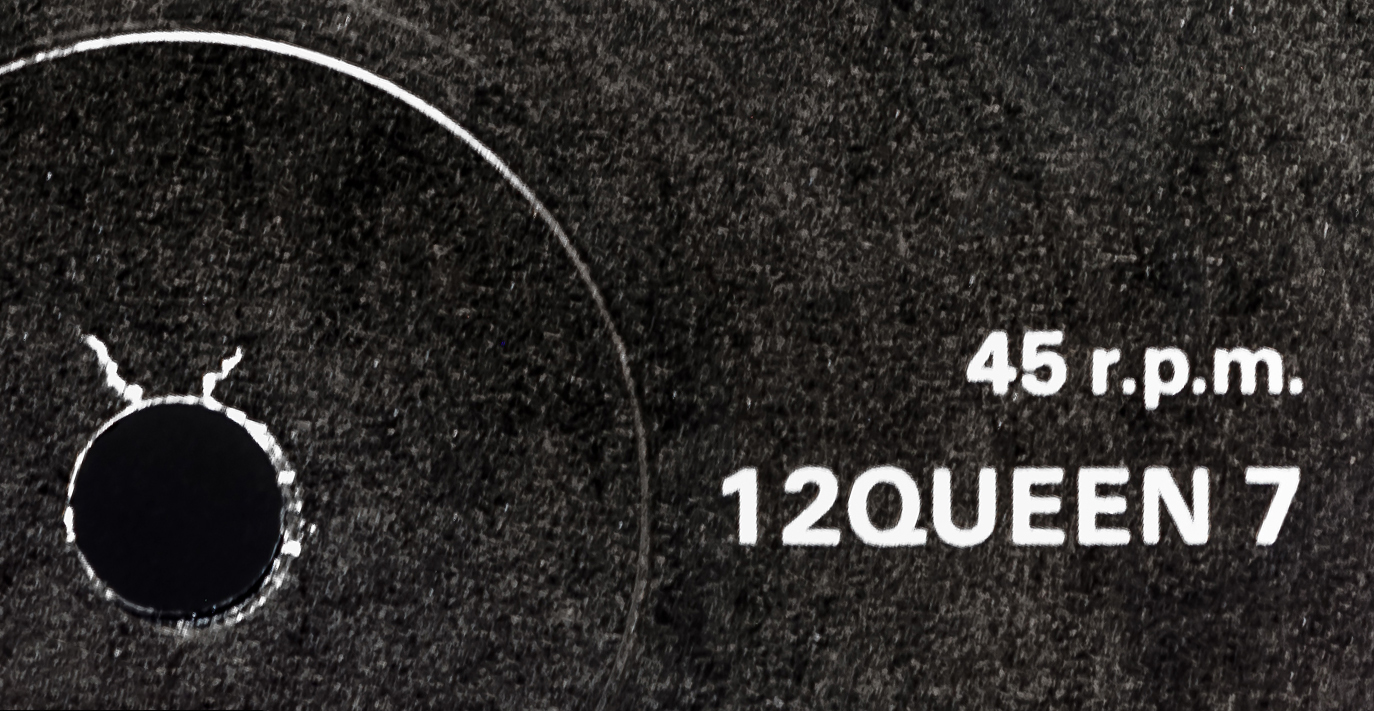
Catalog number on the same record

The matrix number printed on the label should not be confused with the catalogue number, which is usually in larger type, and will typically be the same number on both sides of the record. Matrix numbers will be different on each side, and are sometimes printed upside down on the label to prevent them from being mistaken for the catalogue number.

The purpose of the main number is to assign a filing number to the stamper, and to ensure each side receives the proper label, by visually comparing the number on the label to the inscribed number.

The most important part of the extra information is usually the cut number, which is a suffix to the main number. For example, matrix number 12345 is seen on a label, but examination of the run-out groove area reveals number 12345–3, which indicates this is the third cut of this side. It is not unusual to find records with a different cut number on each side.

Sides are recut for various reasons. Record stampers could only be used to make a limited number of copies before they became worn, and a new cut was required. As of the early 1980s, this was no longer true. Changes to master disc manufacturing methods, including the DMM or Direct Metal Mastering system, made it possible to make many copies of a master cut non-destructively, so a recut was no longer necessary when the plate used for pressing became worn. Stampers can also become damaged from handling. Recuts can also be made when there is a problem with the previous cut, for example, a technical fault or improper banding (the visual separation between songs). When a new cut is made, several copies called test pressings are made for technicians (and, for a new record, the producer and the recording artist) to review the cut, and determine if it should be accepted or rejected. If it is rejected, another cut must be made.

More reasons for multiple cuts: If a record is pressed at more than one factory, as can be the case when a popular release is issued by a major record company with factories in more than one city, each factory may make its own master cut. If a record is issued internationally, each country typically cuts its own masters. If a record is re-issued by a different company, or by the same company under a different catalogue number, the record is usually recut, although there are occasions where the previous cut is reused and the new number is added to the inscriptions in the run-out area, sometimes with the previous number scratched out.

== Singles ==
Records with one song per side, particularly 7-inch 45 rpm and 10-inch or 12-inch 78 rpm records, are often found with non-consecutive matrix numbers on each side, and the "hit" side or "side one" may not necessarily be the lower number. This indicates that the numbers were probably assigned at the time the songs were recorded. If there is a significant gap between the two numbers, the songs were probably not recorded at the same session. If the numbers appear to be from completely different sequences, or have a different format or number of digits, this can indicate that the numbers were assigned by the recording studio, and the two sides were recorded at different studios. When record historian Brian Rust researched his discography books on early recordings, he was able to determine the studio and approximate recording date of certain songs from matrix numbers by comparing them to other numbers in the sequence.

== 78 rpm records ==
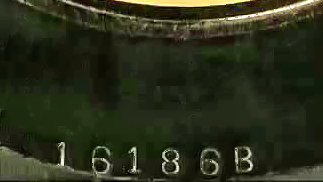
Stamped matrix number on a 1907 record, Always Leave Them Laughing When You Say Goodbye with Billy Murray, on Victor Records

In the days of 78 rpm records, before recording tape was commonly used (up to approx. 1950), audio recordings were cut directly to disc. The recording studio would assign a number to the song to be recorded, which would become the main part of the matrix number, and several takes would be made, with the take number inscribed in the matrix area. Only one take would be selected for issue in most cases, but there are occasions where alternate takes were issued as well, possibly by accident. Frequently, the record label on an alternate take is identical to the label for the more common take, as it only shows the "main" matrix number for the song without the take number.

Alternate takes are of interest to collectors, particularly if the music is jazz. Since jazz is often partially improvised, two takes can contain significant differences, and a comparison of two takes can reveal which portions of the music were pre-determined, and which were improvised or variable. Also, when two takes are released, one is usually much more common than the other, and the less common take can become a valuable record to collectors.

Take numbers on Victor Records can usually be found to the left at the label, i.e. the "9 o'clock" position.

When looking for matrix information on 78 rpm records, care should be taken to examine the label area as well, as some numbers may be coded underneath the label, and are viewable as indentations.

== Albums ==
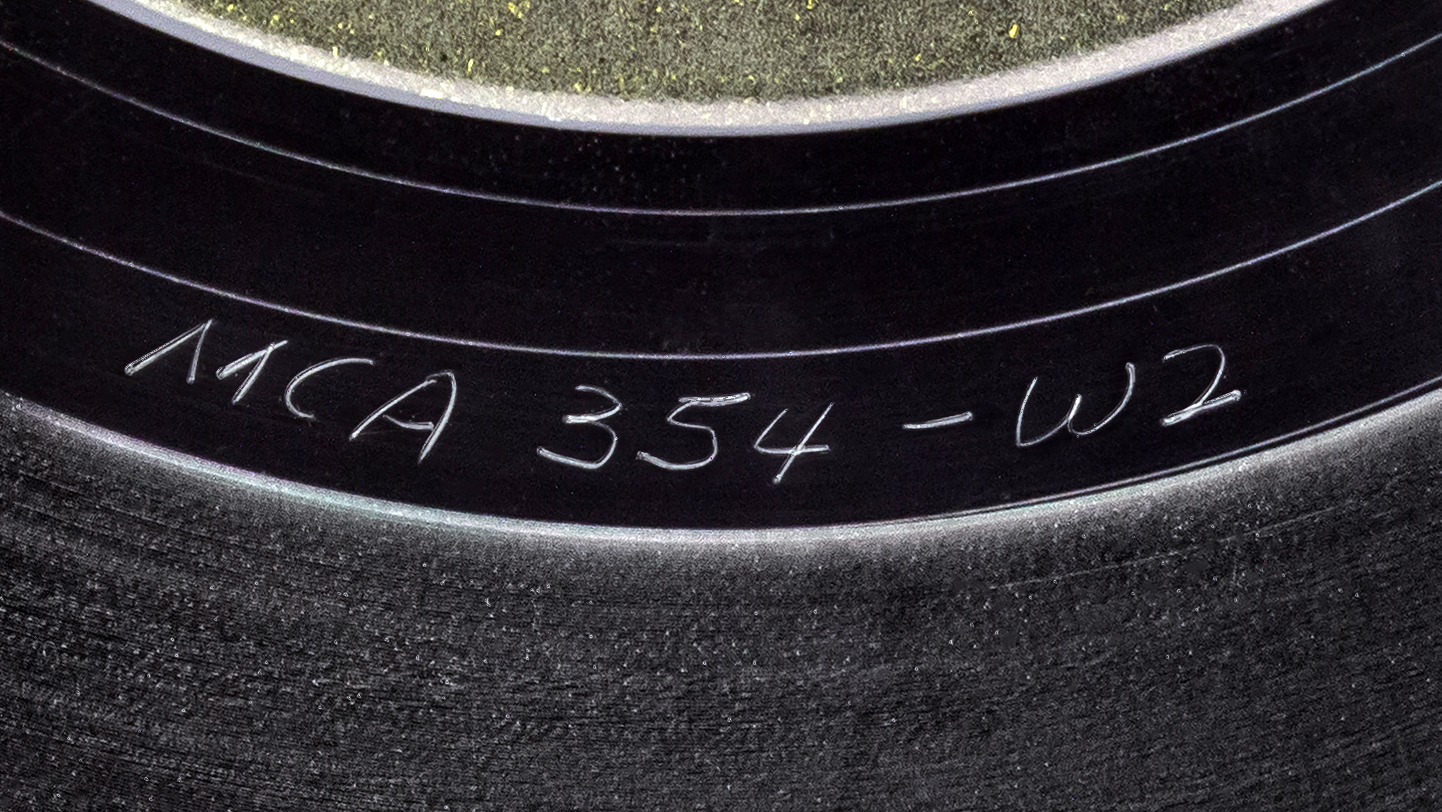
Handwritten matrix number on the 1973 vinyl LP album Goodbye Yellow Brick Road by Elton John

Album matrix numbers are often similar to the catalogue number. For example, a record numbered X-1234 may have a matrix number like A–1234 or X–1234–A on side one, and B–1234 or X–1234–B on side two, as shown on the label. In the run-out area, the latter number could be expressed as X–1234–B7, where 7 is the cut number. In other instances, the matrix numbers may be a separate series of two consecutive numbers such as 55667 and 55668.

== Compact discs ==
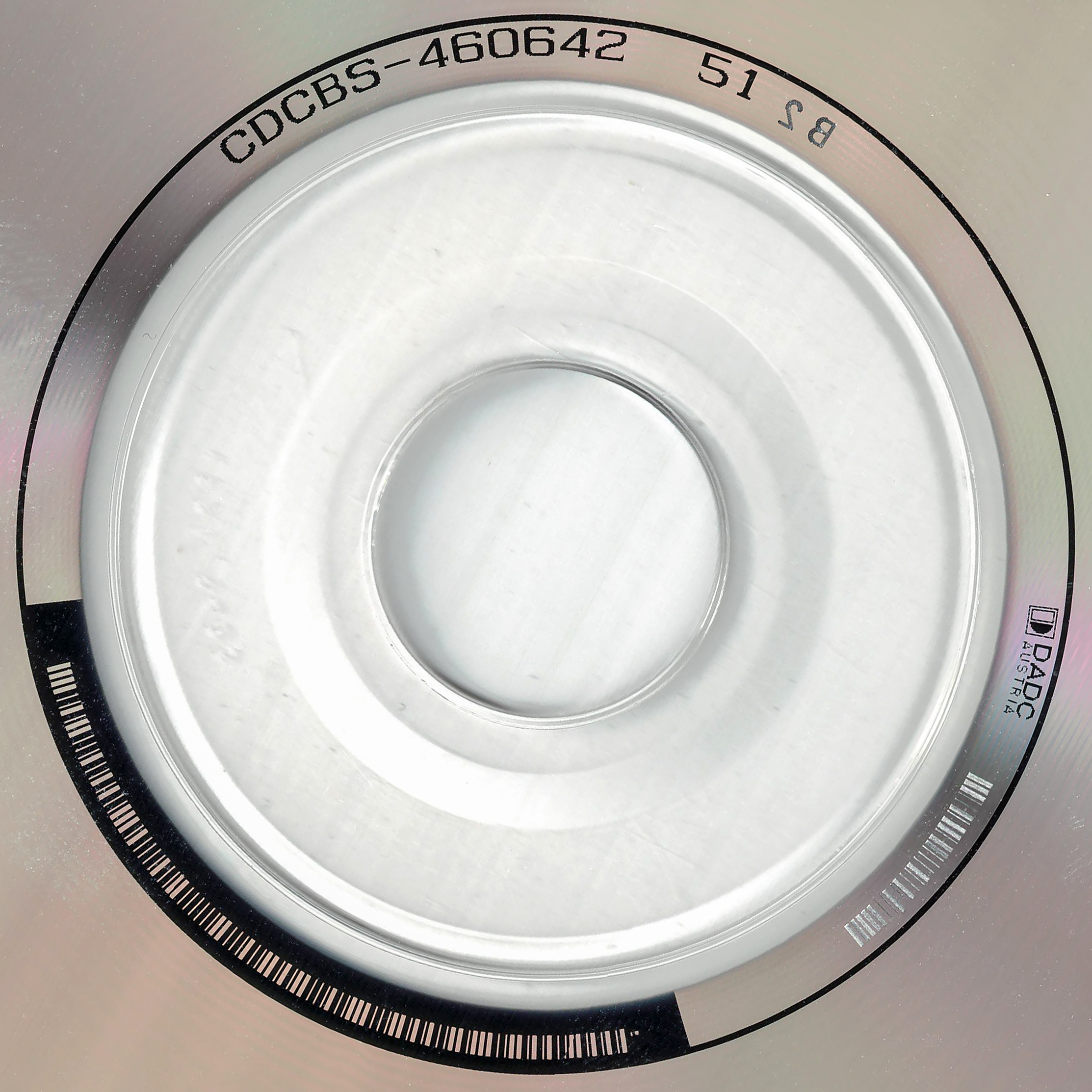
Matrix number on CD album I'm Your Man by Leonard Cohen

Compact discs (CDs) also contain factory codes inscribed near the hub, and these are also called matrix numbers.

== Importance to collectors ==
Matrix numbers are often quoted as evidence that a record is a "first pressing", although this term is not used in a consistent manner by collectors. Records can be pressed in multiple batches that are identical, and therefore a group of batches must be regarded as one "pressing". Collectors sometimes refer to a "second pressing" when a major change takes place, such as a change to the selection or order of songs on an album side, or a not-so-major change such as a different record label design, or correction of a typo on the label text, or minor variation of the cover, such as a change of address for the record company. Or they may refer to a record as a "second pressing" if the cut number changes, but the label, cover, and musical content are otherwise identical. A first cut could be a rejected cut, and a cut #2 or later could actually be the one used for the first pressing as issued to the public. Even so, collectible records are often questionably identified as "first pressing" based solely on the matrix number marked as cut #1.

If a record is recut for re-issue with a new catalogue number, the cut number will probably start at #1 again. Therefore, a matrix number in itself is not proof of an original pressing, and additional research should be done before declaring a record to be a first pressing.

A greater importance to collectors is where a recut contains an audible difference from previous cuts. Some recuts contain a different take, mix, or edit (length of song) from previous editions. Some recuts are made to re-issue a song with different lyrics as an act of censorship. Even if a censored record is only distributed to radio stations as a promo edition, there could be two versions of the promo: censored and uncensored. Some recuts with altered content have a suffix of "-RE" at the end of the inscribed matrix number, but this does not necessarily mean that the non-"RE" edition was issued to the public.

In cases where a popular release is issued by a major label that uses more than one factory, so that copies are manufactured in several cities, a factory code in the form of a number, acronym, symbol, or logo found in the run-out area may have importance. These are sometimes quoted when collectible records are offered for sale. Factory codes used by major American labels such as Capitol, Warner Bros., RCA and Mercury have been documented by researchers.

== Hidden messages ==
Record collectors have often been amused to find hidden messages inscribed in the run-out area. Many are the work of George Peckham, a disc cutting engineer in the UK who possibly cut hundreds of thousands of records for many record companies over several decades from the 1960s onward, and often signed his cuts "Porky" or marked them as "A Porky Prime Cut". While some of his cuts state only his nickname or motto, others contain a clever or cryptic reference to something mentioned in the lyrics, or something about the recording artist. Some of his inscriptions include a small drawing or cartoon. Most of his cuts can be found on records manufactured in the UK, but his use of messages has been imitated by others, and similar messages can be found in records from various countries. They can even be found on compact discs on occasion.

On the original UK edition of This Year's Model (1978), the second album by Elvis Costello, Peckham inscribed a message stating that this is the winning copy of a contest, and anyone finding this message should call the phone number which follows to claim their prize. The prize was a pre-printed signature photo of Elvis Costello which was sent out in limited numbers.

U2's Rattle and Hum (1988) features a secret message to the band's production manager, Anne Louise Kelly, reading "We Love You A.L.K.", but this was the first of several hidden messages referring to her in U2 albums, followed by her name being scrambled to make the name Kiley Sue LaLonne in the booklet of Original Soundtracks 1 (1995) and then on most CD copies of Pop (1997), a message on the playing side of the CD near the matrix numbers reads "4UALKXXXX". Similarly, most US CD copies of Pills 'n' Thrills and Bellyaches (1990) by Happy Mondays feature the phrase "CALL THE COPS" inscribed in the matrix.

Although hidden messages are usually the invention of the disc cutting engineer, there is an instance where a message is believed to have been inserted at the request of the recording artist, on Led Zeppelin's single, "Immigrant Song", which contains this message on copies made in more than one country: "Do What Thou Wilt Shall Be The Whole Of The Law". Not all copies contain this inscription, and copies that do have a higher collector's value.

On Emitt Rhodes' self-titled album, an ornate design surround a "Recorded at Home" inscription, as Rhodes recorded the entire album by himself and at his home.

== See also ==
- UC (noise reduction), a compander system used by several East-German record labels in the 1980s indicated by a letter "U" in the runout area
