= Never Say Die =

Never Say Die may refer to:

== Literature ==
- Never Say Die (memoir), a 1961 memoir by Jack Hawkins
- Never Say Die (novel), a 2017 novel in the Alex Rider series by Anthony Horowitz

== Film and television ==
- Never Say Die (1920 film), British film by Walter Forde
- Never Say Die (1924 film), a film featuring Douglas MacLean
- Never Say Die (1939 film), a romantic comedy starring Bob Hope and Martha Raye
- Never Say Die (1950 film), or Don't Say Die, British comedy film
- Never Say Die (1988 film), a New Zealand action film
- Never Say Die (2017 film), a Chinese film
- Never Say Die (TV series), a 1970 British comedy television series produced by Yorkshire Television
- "Never Say Die", an episode of the TV series Diagnosis: Murder
- Never Say Die (Philippine TV series), a 2026 Philippine television action drama series broadcast by GMA Network

== Music ==
- Never Say Die! Tour (Black Sabbath), a 1978 tour by Black Sabbath
- Impericon Never Say Die! Tour, an annual European metalcore musical tour
- Never Say Die Records, a former British dubstep, bass music, and independent electronic music record label.

=== Albums ===
- Never Say Die!, a 1978 album by Black Sabbath, or the title song
  - Never Say Die (video), a 1986 video by Black Sabbath
- Never Say Die (Petra album), 1981
- Never Say Die: Live, a 2000 album by Waylon Jennings & The Waymore Blues Band, or the title song
  - Never Say Die: The Final Concert, a 2000 concert film featuring Waylon Jennings
- Never Say Die, an album by The Undead, or the title song
- Never Say Die (Wig Wam album), a 2021 album by Wig Wam, or the title song
- Never Say Die (EP), a 2026 EP by Tokyo Rose (band)

=== Songs ===
- "Never Say Die" (Chvrches song). 2018
- "Never Say Die" (Jon Bon Jovi song), 1991
- "It's All Too Much"/"Never Say Die", a 2009 single by Yui
- "Never Say Die", a song by Black Sabbath from Never Say Die!
- "Never Say Die", a song by Europe from Out of This World
- "Never Say Die", a song by Marianas Trench from Astoria
- "Never Say Die", a song by the Monkey Hangerz on the single "Poolie Pride"
- "Never Say Die", a song by Sleigh Bells from Reign of Terror
- "Never Say Die", a 2007 song by The 69 Eyes
- "Never Say Die (Give a Little Bit More)", a 1983 song by Cliff Richard
- "Never Say Die", a song by King Kobra for the 1986 film Iron Eagle

== Other ==
- Never Say Die (horse) (1951–1975), Thoroughbred racehorse
