= Blue bell: March Song and Chorus =

Song
- Language: English
- Published: 1904
- Songwriter: Edward Madden
- Composer: Theodore F. Morse

"Blue bell: March Song and Chorus" is a march style song composed by Theodore F. Morse and written by Edward Madden. The song was published in 1904 by F.B. Haviland Pub. Co., in New York, NY. The cover, illustrated by Rose Starmer, depicts a soldier and a young woman. The song was recorded and popularized by Byron Harland and Frank Stanley, the Haydn Quartet, and Henry Burr.

The sheet music can be found at the Pritzker Military Museum & Library.

The song's lyrics are about a soldier who has to say goodbye to his girlfriend before fighting in the Spanish-American War. After the war is over, and the other soldiers are welcomed home, his girlfriend is told of the death of her lover in battle. This song is centered around a Bluebell, and uses the symbol of that flower to represent his girlfriend.
