= Soldier Boy (disambiguation) =

Soldier Boy is the name of three comic book superheroes from the comic book series The Boys and adaptation.

Soldier Boy may also refer to:

== Media and entertainment ==
- Soldier Boy (film), a 2019 Russian film about World War II
- "Soldier Boy" (1915 song), a World War I era song
- "Soldier Boy" (The Shirelles song), a 1962 number-one single by The Shirelles
- Soldier Boy, an operetta by Emmerich Kálmán
- "Soldier Boy", a 1982 science fiction short story by Michael Shaara
- "Soldier Boy", a song by Martina Topley-Bird ft. Gorillaz and Roots Manuva released as a B-side to the single "Poison" off the 2008 album The Blue God

== Other uses ==
- George Curry (baseball) (1888–1963), American baseball player who went by the nickname "Soldier Boy"

== See also ==
- Soulja Boy (born 1990), American rapper
- Soldier Boys, a novel by Dean Hughes
- Soldier Boyz, a 1995 film
  - Soldier Boyz (video game), based on the film
