= Mendelssohn Quintette Club =

Former chamber ensemble

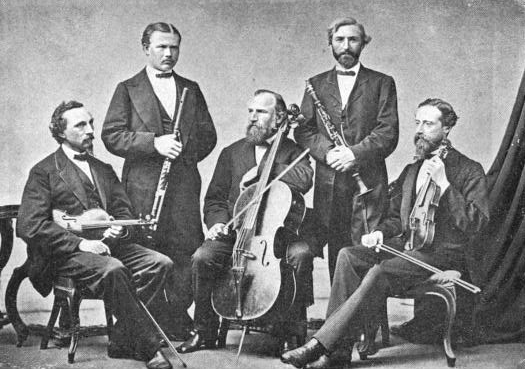
The Mendelssohn Quintette Club, 1849

The Mendelssohn Quintette Club (1849–1895) based in Boston, Massachusetts, was one of "the most active and most widely known chamber ensemble[s] in America" in the latter half of the 19th century. It toured throughout New England and beyond, including Georgia, California and Australia.

== History ==
According to one scholar, the popularity of composer Felix Mendelssohn in America "gained momentum sharply after 1848, when more German musicians, some of whom had been Mendelssohn's pupils, emigrated to America. ... Influential ... was the Mendelssohn Quintette Club, which presented early American performances of several of Mendelssohn's works, including the Quintet in A major, Op. 18, with which the ensemble opened its first concert in 1849."

The Quintette consisted of Thomas Ryan, August Fries, Francis Riha, Eduard Lehmann, Wulf Fries, and others through the years. The group performed in Boston at Cochituate Hall, Boston Music Hall, Chickering & Sons' Hall, and the Melodeon; and outside of Boston at the Gloucester Lyceum, for example. Amongst the numerous 19th-century audience members appeared Sophia Peabody Hawthorne, who attended a concert in 1862 in Concord, Massachusetts, and mentioned it in her diary. "15 January, Wednesday. Storm of snow. General Pierce arrived at noon. ... Julian and I drove to Town Hall to hear the Quintette Club - Andante of fifth symphony of Beethoven. Drove home. Mrs Alcott came with us."

On October 11, 1866, the Mendelssohn Quintette Club gave the world premiere performance of Johannes Brahms's String Sextet No. 2 in G Major, op. 36.

In 1872 members of the Quintette established the "National College of Music," headquartered at Boston's Tremont Temple. The college employed professional music instructors, and attracted a substantial student body. After the fire of November 1872, the college lost many of its students (no longer able to afford tuition), and closed in 1873.
