= Dear Sing Sing =

Song
- Published: 1903
- Composer: Jean Schwartz
- Lyricist: William Jerome

Dear Sing Sing is a popular song, words by William Jerome, music by Jean Schwartz, first published in 1903. A popular singer of the time named Billy Murray recorded at least two versions in 1904, one for Edison Records and another for Victor Records. Both of these recordings are now public domain, and can be downloaded at several websites.

== See also ==
- Billy Murray (singer)
- 1903 in music
- 1904 in music
