= We'll Knock The Heligo-- Into Heligo-- Out Of Heligoland! =

Song composed by Theodore F. Morse

Song
- Language: English
- Published: 1917
- Songwriter(s): Composer: Theodore Morse; Lyricist: John J. O'Brien

We'll Knock The Heligo—Into Heligo—Out Of Heligoland! is a World War I song written by John J. O'Brien and composed by Theodore Morse. The song was first published in 1917 by Leo Feist Inc., in New York, NY. The sheet music cover depicts a terrified Kaiser Wilhelm II standing on top of Heligoland while shells are bursting in his back and United States sailors with guns are rushing toward him.

The sheet music can be found at the Pritzker Military Museum & Library.

== Bibliography ==
- Parker, Bernard S. World War I Sheet Music 1. Jefferson: McFarland & Company, Inc., 2007. ISBN 978-0-7864-2798-7. OCLC 71790113
- Paas, John Roger. 2014. America sings of war: American sheet music from World War I. ISBN 9783447102780. OCLC 892462420
- Vogel, Frederick G. World War I Songs: A History and Dictionary of Popular American Patriotic Tunes, with Over 300 Complete Lyrics. Jefferson: McFarland & Company, Inc., 1995. ISBN 0-89950-952-5. OCLC 32241433
