= Theodora Morse =

American song writer and composer

Theodora Morse (July 11, 1883 – November 10, 1953) was an American songwriter and composer. Often using the professional name Dorothy Terriss, she was a Tin Pan Alley lyricist who collaborated to produce a number of popular songs.

== Background ==
Alfreda Theodora Strandberg was born in Brooklyn, New York. On March 7, 1907, she married Theodore F. Morse (1873–1924). She and her husband became a successful songwriting team for Tin Pan Alley. Listed as Terriss & Morse, they were one of the earliest Tin Pan Alley husband-wife songwriting teams.

== Career ==
Three O'Clock in the Morning
Three O'Clock in the Morning, performed by Paul Whiteman and his Orchestra for Victor Records.

Theodora not only wrote with her husband, but also collaborated with other composers. Professionally, she often used the pseudonyms of Dorothy Terriss, Dolly Morse and D. A. Esrom. She wrote the lyrics for Hail, Hail, the Gang's All Here to a tune originally written by Arthur Sullivan for the comic opera The Pirates of Penzance. The popular good-night waltz Three O'Clock in the Morning was written to music composed by Julián Robledo. The song was recorded in 1922 by Paul Whiteman and his orchestra, and also appeared in the 1946 film Margie. Jazz and pop standard, Wonderful One, was written by Paul Whiteman and Ferde Grofé, with lyrics by Theodora Morse based on a theme by movie director Marshall Neilan.

Theodora Morse died in White Plains, New York, aged 70.

== Selected works ==
- Hail, Hail, the Gang's All Here (1917)
- Soldier Boy (1915) OCLC 26005168
- Three O'Clock in the Morning (1921)
- Wonderful One (1922)
