= When a Blue Service Star Turns to Gold =

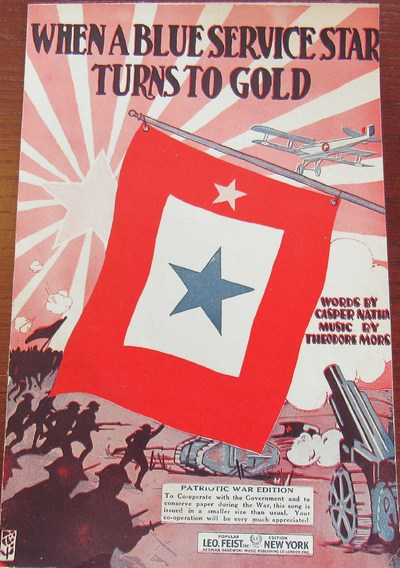

Song
- Released: 1918
- Composer(s): Theodore Morse
- Lyricist(s): Caspar Nathan
- Producer(s): Leo Feist, Inc.

"When a Blue Service Star Turns to Gold" is a World War I era song released in 1918. Caspar Nathan wrote the lyrics. Theodore Morse composed the music. Leo Feist, Inc. of New York, New York published the song. Featured prominently on the sheet music cover is a service star. Beneath it are soldiers charging with artillery, a tank, and a plane. It was written for both voice and piano.

The title of the song refers to the service flags people would place in their windows during wartime. A flag with a blue star meant a member of that family or organization was serving in the war. If the blue star was replaced with a gold star, this indicated that the soldier had died in battle. The chorus is as follows:

When a blue service star turns to gold,
What a tale of affection is told!
Duty to country has cost one his all,
While others at home are bowed
down with the call
In their sorrow, the one's left behind,
Voice a pray'r that is e'er borne in mind
Til souls meet on high,
they must whisper "Good-bye"
When a blue service star turns to gold

The sheet music can be found at Pritzker Military Museum & Library.
