= Wonderful One =

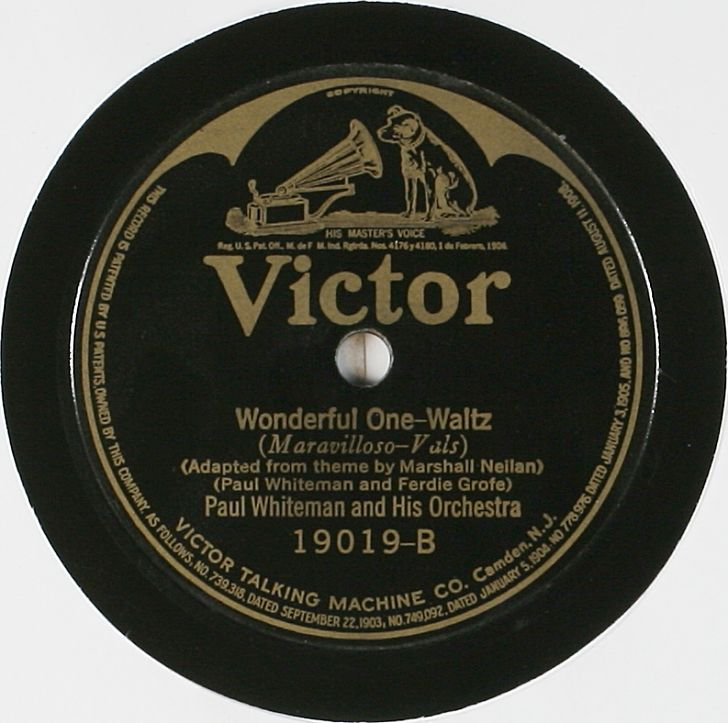
- 1923 Victor 78, 19019-B

Single by Paul Whiteman Orchestra
- Recorded: January 25, 1923; New York City
- Genre: Jazz; Pop
- Composers: Paul Whiteman; Ferde Grofé
- Lyricist: Theodora Morse

"Wonderful One" is a popular song recorded by the Paul Whiteman Orchestra on January 25, 1923, in New York and was released as Victor 19019-B. The record reached no. 3 on the Billboard chart. The song was also recorded as "My Wonderful One".

== Background ==
The music was written by Paul Whiteman and Ferde Grofé, the lyrics by Theodora Morse (also known as Dorothy Terris), based on a theme by movie director Marshall Neilan, "Adapted from a Theme by Marshall Neilan". The song was published in 1922 by Leo Feist in New York as a "Waltz Song" which was dedicated "To Julie".

The song is a well-known jazz and pop standard, recorded by many artists, including Gertrude Moody, Edward Miller, Martha Pryor, Helen Moretti, John McCormack who released it as Victor 961, and Pete Bontsema in 1923. Henry Burr recorded the song in 1924, Jan Garber in 1936 and Glenn Miller and his Orchestra in 1940. The Paul Whiteman Orchestra recorded the song three times, in an acoustical version in 1923, an electrical version in 1928, both released as Victor 78 singles, and in 1959 on the Grand Award LP album 33-412.

== Movie appearances ==
"Wonderful One" appeared in the following movies: Agatha (1979), The Chump Champ (1950), Julia Misbehaves (1948), Little 'Tinker (1948), Margie (1946), Red Hot Riding Hood (1943), Sufferin' Cats (1943), Design for Scandal (1941), Strike Up the Band (1940), and Westward Passage (1932).

The song was also featured in the 1950 MGM movie To Please a Lady starring Clark Gable and Barbara Stanwyck.

The song was sampled in 1997 by the American hip hop group Psycho Realm in the song "Temporary Insanity" contained on their debut album The Psycho Realm.

== Recordings ==
- Paul Whiteman and His Orchestra, 1922, original instrumental version on Victor
- Martha Pryor, 1923
- Edward Miller, 1923
- Gertrude Moody, 1923
- John McCormack, 1923
- Pete Bontsema, 1923
- Henry Burr, 1924
- Jan Garber, 1936
- Glenn Miller and His Orchestra, 1939, on RCA Bluebird
- Frances Langford
- Art Tatum
- The Chordettes, 1953
- Paul Weston and His Orchestra, 1953, instrumental version
- Ken Griffin, 1954, instrumental
- Mel Tormé, 1955
- The McGuire Sisters, 1956
- Tony Bennett, 1960, To My Wonderful One album
- David Whitfield, 1961
- Della Reese, 1963
- Jerry Vale, 1963
- George Sanders on the album Songs for the Lovely Lady
- Bent Fabric, 1964
- Doris Day, 1967
- Bill Kenny
- Vera Lynn
- Woody Herman
- Helen Moretti
- Dave Frishberg
- Fred Hartley
- Floyd Dixon
- Mari Jones
- Ben Light on Tempo
- Barbara Cameron on King Records
- Elizabeth Spencer, 1923 on Edison Records
- Psycho Realm, 1997 sample

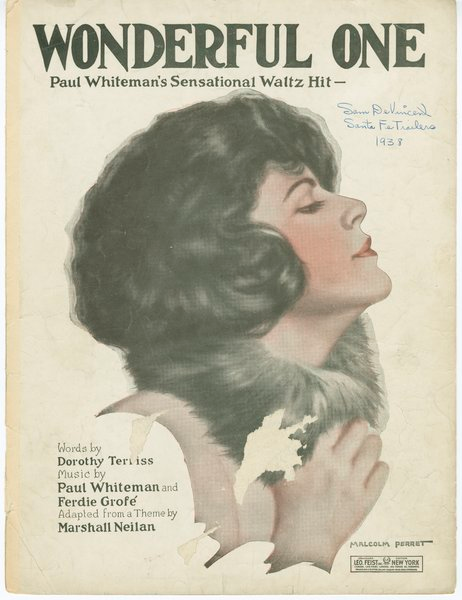
"Wonderful One, Paul Whiteman's Sensational Waltz Hit", 1923 sheet music cover, Leo Feist, New York.
