= Gloucester Lyceum =

Lyceum in Gloucester, Massachusetts, U.S.

Coordinates: 42.613°N 70.663°W

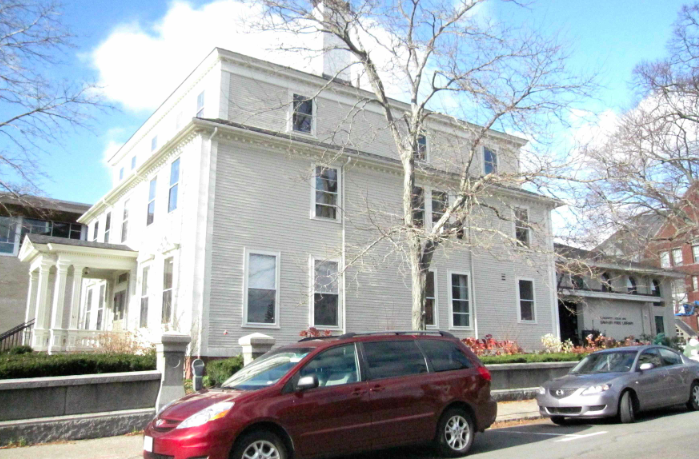
Gloucester Lyceum and Sawyer Free Library

The Gloucester Lyceum (1830-1872) of Gloucester, Massachusetts, was an association for "the improvement of its members in useful knowledge, and the advancement of popular education." It incorporated in 1831.

From the 1830s through at least the 1860s, the Lyceum arranged lectures from notables such as: Ralph Waldo Emerson, Oliver Wendell Holmes Sr., "the two Everetts, Choate, Sumner, Rantoul, Winthrop, Colfax, Greely, ... Parker, Curtis, Phillips, Bayard Taylor, Dr. Holland, Chapin, Starr King, Hillard, ... Beecher, Giles, Gough, Dr. Hayes, the Arctic explorer, Burlingame, ... Alger, Whipple, Murdoch, Vanderhoff, Bancroft, and Dana." From 1830, "meetings were held in Union Hall ... until 1844 when the Murray Institute was used for one season prior to the occupancy of the Town Hall."

In 1854 "the Lyceum opened its library on Wednesday and Saturday afternoons and evenings, with 1,400 volumes. It was located in the eastern parlor of the residence of F. G. Low on what was then the corner of Spring and Duncan Streets." Patrons could use the library for $1 per year; the fee was waived for those unable to afford it. In 1863 the library moved to Front Street; the building burned down in 1864. Thereafter it occupied rooms on Middle Street (in the Baptist church), and later on Front Street (in the Babson block). Much of the funding for the library came from "Samuel E. Sawyer, a Boston merchant, but a native of Gloucester."

The Lyceum became the Gloucester Lyceum and Sawyer Free Library under a new charter in 1872.

== Lectures/Performances ==
- 1830
  - Hosea Hildreth
  - William Ferson
  - Mr. Spencer
  - Benjamin Crowninshield
  - Charles G. Putnam
  - Henry Prentiss
- 1832
  - John James Babson
- 1834
  - Mr. Ward
- 1835
  - George S. Hillard
  - A. H. Everett
  - Jerome V. C. Smith
  - Ezekiel W. Leach
  - Rev. Mr. Sewall
  - Daniel P. King
  - Rev. Mr. Withington
  - Rev. Mr. Fox
  - Samuel E. Cowes
  - A. L. Peirson
  - Rev. Mr. Williams
  - Rev. Mr. Worcester
  - John S. Williams
  - Rev. Mr. Thompson
  - George H. Devereux
  - R. S. Edes
- 1848
  - Henry David Thoreau
- 1858-1859
  - Henry Ward Beecher
  - Daniel C. Eddy
  - A. D. Mayo
  - Wendell Phillips
  - George Vandenhoff
  - George B. Loring
  - John G. Saxe
  - George D. Prentice
- 1860
  - Mendelssohn Quintette Club
  - Grace Greenwood
  - George Sumner
  - William W. Sylvester
  - William H. Millburn, "the blind preacher"
  - George William Curtiss, "author of Trumps"
  - Rufus Laighton Jr.
  - Benjamin H. Smith Jr.
  - William Hague

== See also ==
- Lyceum movement
