= Never Say Die (1939 film) =

1939 film by Elliott Nugent

- Theatrical release poster
- Directed by: Elliott Nugent
- Written by: Play: William H. Post; William Collier Sr. Screenplay: Dan Hartman; Frank Butler; Preston Sturges
- Produced by: Paul Jones
- Starring: Martha Raye; Bob Hope
- Cinematography: Leo Tover
- Edited by: James Smith
- Music by: Songs: Ralph Rainger (music); Leo Robin (lyrics); Score: Charles Bradshaw; John Leipold; Leo Shuken
- Production company: Paramount Pictures
- Distributed by: Paramount Pictures
- Release dates: March 9, 1939 (New York City); April 14, 1939 (United States)
- Running time: 82 minutes
- Country: United States
- Language: English

Never Say Die is a 1939 American romantic comedy film starring Martha Raye and Bob Hope. Based on a play of the same title by William H. Post and William Collier Sr., which ran on Broadway for 151 performances in 1912, the film was directed by Elliott Nugent and written for the screen by Dan Hartman, Frank Butler and Preston Sturges. The supporting cast features Andy Devine, Alan Mowbray, Gale Sondergaard, Sig Ruman and Monty Woolley.

The Post/Collier play had previously been adapted in 1924 as a silent film of the same name and was remade as the 2004 South Korean film Someone Special. Other films with the same or similar titles are not related.

== Plot ==
When test results get mixed up, multi-millionaire hypochondriac John Kidley is told that he only has a month to live. He dumps his fiancée, Juno Marko, while he is at the Swiss spa of Bad Gaswasser, there he meets a young Texas heiress, Mickey Hawkins.

Mickey has been betrothed to the fortune-hunting Prince Smirnov, but is in love with Henry Munch, a bus driver from back home. Believing he is dying, and wanting to help out, John suggests that Mickey and he get married, planning on leaving her his fortune so that she can marry who she wants when he's gone. On their honeymoon, with Henry along as a chaperone, the couple fall in love for real, although, of course, they don't realize it right away.

During the honeymoon, Mickey makes a bet that she can tell which man is kissing her while she's blindfolded. The experiment takes an unexpected turn when a bear scares off John and Henry and Mickey ends up enthusiastically kissing the animal.

Eventually, John bests the Prince in a duel, Henry and Juno get engaged, and John and Mickey get to stay together.

== Cast ==
- Martha Raye as Mickey Hawkins
- Bob Hope as John Kidley
- Andy Devine as Henry Munch
- Alan Mowbray as Prince Smirnov
- Gale Sondergaard as Juno Marko
- Sig Ruman as Poppa Ingleborg
- Ernest Cossart as Jeepers
- Paul Harvey as Jasper Hawkins
- Frances Arms as Momma Ingleborg
- Ivan F. Simpson as Kretsky
- Monty Woolley as Dr. Schmidt
- Foy Van Dolsen as Kretsky's bodyguard
- Christian Rub as The mayor

Cast notes:

- Hans Conried has a small uncredited part, only his second film appearance.
- Albert Dekker, who plays the uncredited role of "Kidley's second" was an established Broadway star before turning to film acting.

== Songs ==
"The Tra La La and the Oom Pah Pah" - by Ralph Rainger (music) and Leo Robin (lyrics)

== Production ==
Never Say Die was originally slated to star Jack Benny and Franciska Gaal, under the direction of Raoul Walsh and produced by Arthur Hornblow Jr. The film was in production from early October to early December 1938, and premiered in New York on 9 March 1939. It went into general release on 14 April of that year.

=== Production credits ===
- Elliott Nugent - director
- Paul Jones - producer
- Don Hartman - screenplay
- Frank Butler - screenplay
- Preston Sturges - screenplay
- William H. Post - writer of play on which the film was based
- Leo Tover - photography
- Farciot Edouart - special photographic effects
- Hans Dreier - art direction
- Ernst Fegté - art direction
- Edith Head - costumes
- James Smith - editor
- Philip Wisdom - sound recording
- Walter Oberst - sound recording
- A. E. Freudeman - interior decorations
- Boris Morros - musical direction
