= Mother, Here's Your Boy! =

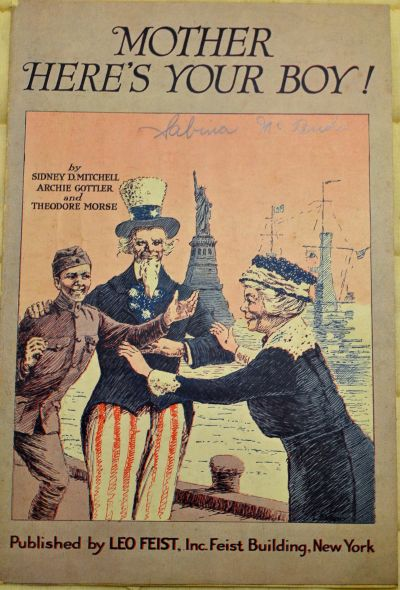
- Sheet Music cover

Song
- Language: English and French
- Published: 1918
- Composer(s): Sidney D. Mitchell, Archie Gottler, and Theodore Morse

"Mother, Here's Your Boy!" is a World War I song written and composed by Sidney D. Mitchell, Archie Gottler, and Theodore Morse. This song was published in 1918 by Leo. Feist, Inc., in New York, NY. The sheet music cover depicts Uncle Sam presenting a returning soldier to his mother with the Statue of Liberty and ships in the background.

The sheet music can be found at the Pritzker Military Museum & Library.

== Bibliography ==
- Music trades. January 1919. Englewood, N.J., etc.: Music Trades Corp.
- Parker, Bernard S. World War I Sheet Music 1. Jefferson: McFarland & Company, Inc., 2007. ISBN 978-0-7864-2798-7. OCLC 71790113
- The Saturday evening post. Vol. 191. Philadelphia: G. Graham.
- Vogel, Frederick G. World War I Songs: A History and Dictionary of Popular American Patriotic Tunes, with Over 300 Complete Lyrics. Jefferson: McFarland & Company, Inc., 1995. ISBN 0-89950-952-5. OCLC 32241433
