= Two Little Boys =

1903 song

Song
- Released: 1903
- Songwriter: Edward Madden
- Composer: Theodore F. Morse

"Two Little Boys" is a sentimental song about two friends who grow up to be soldiers. Recorded as early as 1903 in the United States, it became an international hit for Australian Rolf Harris 66 years later. It was published in 1903 by American composer Theodore F. Morse and lyricist Edward Madden.

The first of numerous recordings was by American singer Billy Murray who released it in the United States in 1903 with the title "When We Were Two Little Boys". It became a popular music hall song of the time. Sheet music published in the United States in 1903 has a photograph of vaudeville singer and recording artist Dan W. Quinn, with the words "Successfully sung by Dan W. Quinn".

The song parallels a childhood incident, the two boys playing soldier with wooden horses, and a dramatic battlefield rescue when they have grown up to be soldiers. The war referred to in the song is not identified.

The song may have inspired others, such as "Two Little Sailor Boys", also by Madden, 1906, and The Four Virginians' "Two Little Lads", which used the same melody to tell a different story, as well as lesser lyric changes, such as the bluegrass band The Country Gentlemen referring to the fallen soldier as the other's "brother" instead of "comrade" in their 1962 version.

In 1969, the song became a No. 1 single in the United Kingdom for Australian entertainer Rolf Harris, and some believed the song had Crimean War or Boer War origins.

== Origins ==
The song appears to have its origins in the fiction of the Victorian children's writer Juliana Horatia Ewing, whose book Jackanapes was a story about the eponymous hero and his friend Tom, who having ridden wooden horses as two little boys end up together on a battlefield. There Jackanapes rides to the rescue of the wounded and dismounted Tom. Jackanapes nobly replies to Tom's entreaties to save himself, "Leave you? To save my skin? No, Tom. Not to save my soul." And unfortunately takes a fatal bullet in the process.

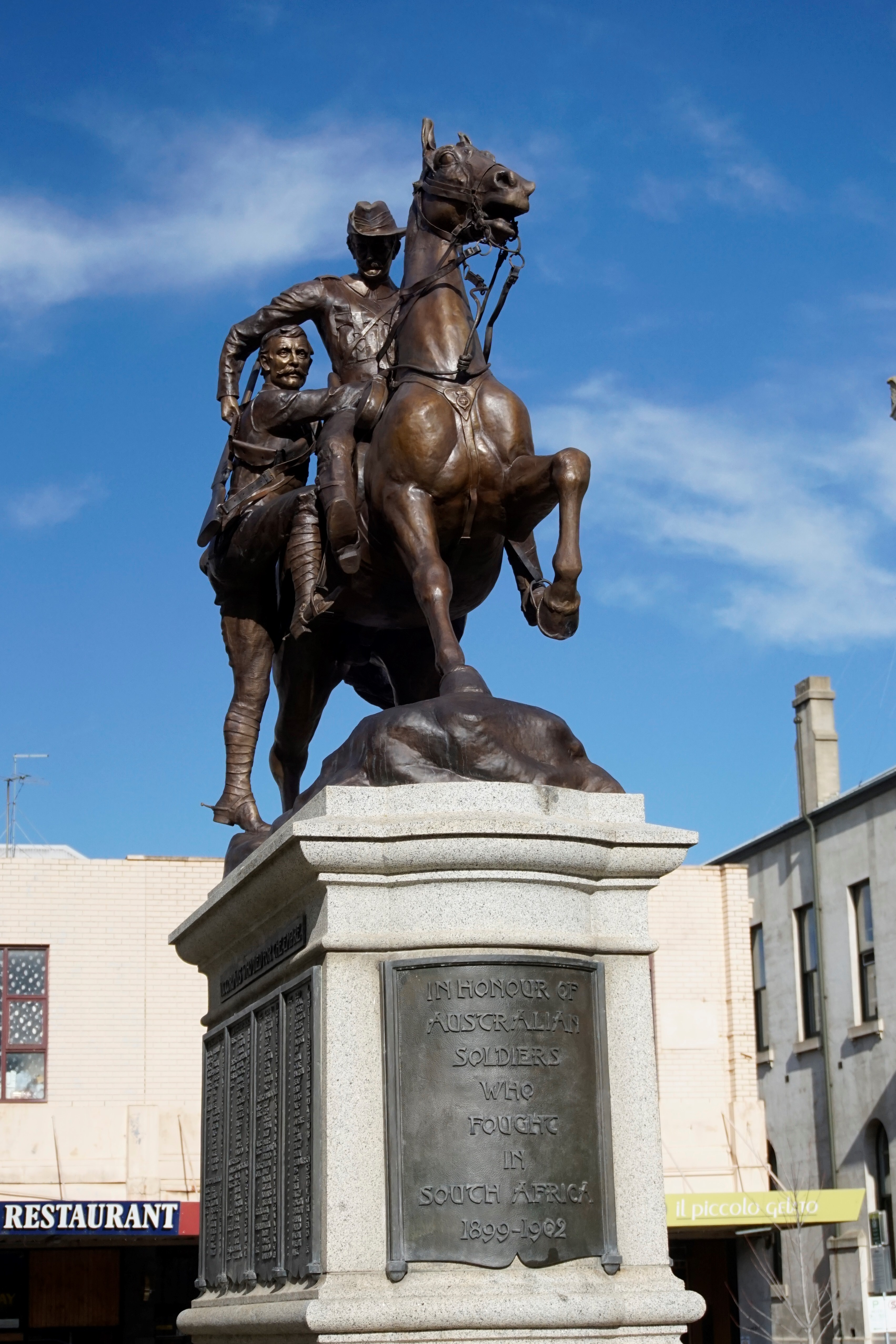
Boer War memorial, Ballarat, Australia

There is some indication that the song also shares a similarity to an incident in the Boer War, in March or April 1900, described in a book written about the war by two members of an English volunteer regiment published in 1902. The incident involved members of the Australian contingent:

It was during one of these patrols that the Boers, lying in wait for the Australians, fired into them, killing one of their horses; the dismounted man sprang up behind a comrade and galloped away pursued by the Boers. Suddenly in front appeared a strong barbed wire boundary fence, five or six strands high. The Boers made sure of their prey; but the Australians, riding without hesitation at the wire, cleared it, every one of them, the horse carrying two men as gallantly as the rest. Needless to say, these were no Cape ponies or Argentines, but fine Australian horses; indeed it was impossible not to be filled with admiration at the way this contingent was mounted, many of the horses in the ranks being high-class steeplechase animals of bone and substance, and of a very fine stamp.

The lyric "out from the ranks so blue" could also refer to the American Civil War, a reference to the blue uniforms worn by Union troops. The United States Army also occasionally also wore blue uniforms in the Spanish American War of 1898.

== Rolf Harris ==
"Two Little Boys"

Single by Rolf Harris
- B-side: "I Love My Love"
- Written: 1969
- Released: 22 November 1969
- Recorded: 1969
- Length: 3:19
- Label: Columbia
- Songwriters: Theodore F. Morse, Edward Madden
- Producer: Mickey Clarke

Rolf Harris singles chronology
| "Bluer Than Blue" (1969) | "Two Little Boys" (1969) | "Tennessee Birdwalk" (1970) |

Official audio
- "Two Little Boys" on YouTube

In 1969 the song "Two Little Boys" was revived by Australian entertainer Rolf Harris, who originally got it from Ted Egan. Alan Braden co-wrote and arranged the song after having it sung down the phone from Australia by Harris. Back in the UK, Harris persuaded his television producer to incorporate the song into his BBC variety show. Alan Braden arranged and co-wrote the song for the TV show, and a favourable audience reaction prompted Harris to record and release it as a single. The song reached number 1 on the UK Singles Chart on 18 December 1969, where it stayed for six weeks, thus becoming the first chart-topping single of the 1970s as well as the last of the 1960s. On BBC Radio Blackburn in 1979, Margaret Thatcher picked it as a favourite song. In Australia the single reached number 7 in 1970, and was in the top 25 charting singles for that year.

In October 2008, Harris announced he would re-record the song, backed by North Wales's Froncysyllte Male Voice Choir, to mark the 90th anniversary of the end of World War I. Proceeds from the new release went to The Poppy Appeal. Harris was inspired to make the recording after participating in My Family at War, a short series of programmes in the BBC's Remembrance season, which was broadcast in November 2008. He discovered that the experiences of his father and uncle during World War I mirrored the lyrics of the song.

== Other versions ==
The song was covered on the 1971 7th studio album by Kenny Rogers and the First Edition, Transition.

The song was also covered in 1980 by Splodgenessabounds and reached number 26 on the UK Singles Chart.

== In popular culture ==
In the film Trainspotting, Spud sings the song in the pub after Tommy’s funeral.

Scottish comedian Billy Connolly recorded a parody of the song with new lyrics entitled "Two Little Boys in Blue" on his Raw Meat for the Balcony LP in 1977. This version of the song told the story of two boys who grow up to be policemen.

American cartoonist and songwriter Shel Silverstein recorded "Civil War Song" in 1962, a parody of tragic and sentimental Civil War ballads unearthed by "folk music revival" pop singers at the time. Appearing on his album Inside Folk Songs, it is sung from the perspective of a third prospective recruit, who decides instead of choosing the blue or gray uniform to "wear my tight blue pants and grey sport jacket", protest the war with a "picket sign and a bottle of wine", and "stay at home with the girls".

Two Little Boys is the original title of New Zealand film Deano and Nige's Best Last Day Ever. The Rolf Harris version appears early in the film before giving way to a punk version as the two leads are introduced. Throughout the film one of them imagines himself as a soldier helping his childhood friend despite the cost to himself. As the actors/characters are from Australia and New Zealand, this could also serve as a nod to the ANZAC spirit - the historic military brotherhood shared between the two countries since World War I.

"Two Little Boys" was a title of an episode of The Brittas Empire, the song is referenced during the episode and its tune is played towards the end of the episode.

A techno duo called Two Little Boys released a 1991 single titled "Stylophonia", which extensively samples the voice of Rolf Harris explaining the stylophone instrument and singing the chorus of "Two Little Boys".

== Football chants ==
Hartlepool United football fans have sung "Two Little Boys" on the terraces since the 1980s. A version by a group of Hartlepool fans was released as a double A-side with "Never Say Die" on the single "Poolie Pride", recorded under the name of "Monkey Hangerz", reaching number 24 on the UK Singles Chart in 2005.

== See also ==
- List of number-one singles of 1969 and 1970 (Ireland)
- List of UK Singles Chart number ones of the 1960s
- List of UK Singles Chart number ones of the 1970s
