= Amiga (record label) =

East German record label

- Parent company: Sony
- Founded: 1947
- Founder: Ernst Busch
- Distributor: Sony
- Genre: Pop; rock; jazz; folk
- Country of origin: Germany

Amiga is a popular music record label in Germany. Once an organ of the East German state-owned music publisher VEB Deutsche Schallplatten, Amiga became a label of the Bertelsmann Music Group in 1994.

In 1947, actor and singer Ernst Busch got permission from the Soviet Military Administration in Germany to create a music publishing house, which was named Lied der Zeit GmbH ("Song of the Times"). This publishing company included the label Amiga. The label continued issues its singles in the 10" 78 RPM format until 1960, and it began issuing singles in the 7" 45 RPM format in 1957.

In the 1950s, Lied der Zeit became VEB Deutsche Schallplatten ("German Records"), a state-owned company with a monopoly on record production. VEB Deutsche Schallplatten had a number of labels, each with a different purview; Amiga releases included folk, jazz, pop, rock, Schlager music, chanson, and children's music.

After the dissolution of the German Democratic Republic, most of the former East German public state enterprises were dismantled or sold to private investors. The Amiga label and catalog were acquired by Bertelsmann Music Group in 1994, which in turn was dissolved into Sony Music Entertainment in 2008.

Amiga's catalog consists of 2,200 albums and about 5,000 singles, with a total of 30,000 titles.

== See also ==
- List of record labels
- UC (noise reduction), a compander system undocumentedly used on many Amiga records between 1983 and 1990

== Books ==
- Birgit und Michael Rauhut: AMIGA - Die Diskographie (ISBN 3-89602-189-3) Info in German
