= UC (noise reduction) =

Noise reduction system for vinyl records

The UC compander system (with "UC" derived from Universal Compatible or Universal Compander) is a noise reduction system for vinyl records, aiming at highest playback compatibility even without corresponding UC expander.

== Overview ==
The UC compander system was developed in the 1980s by VEB Zentrum Wissenschaft und Technik (ZWT) of VEB Kombinat Rundfunk und Fernsehen (RFT) in the former German Democratic Republic (GDR). The system was based on the observation that the dynamic range of typical audio source material almost always needs to be reduced in the vinyl mastering process and that very similar system parameters are commonly applied in the process either by the sound engineer or through the hardware. (Note: At this time VEB Deutsche Schallplatten often used an EMT 156 compander, and they observed that they frequently ended up with very similar compression settings being acoustically acceptable.^{[A]}) The idea was to develop a compander system loosely emulating this process and to formally standardize on its characteristics. By emulating the typical characteristics of this compression, UC compressed records would not produce acoustical artifacts which would not have been present in similar form on the produced disk anyway, and that thereby they would remain virtually unrecognizable, so that consumption would remain acoustically pleasing and compatible even if records were later played back without UC expander. (Note: Given the similarities of the UC compression characteristics with that of the normal compression applied in the mastering, this also means that utilizing an UC expander on non-UC records will often lead to acoustically pleasing results as well.) Initial experiments with a compression factor of 2:1:2 were found to still cause too many artifacts to maintain this compatibility, which led the UC developers to implement a broadband compander utilizing an adaptive compression factor between 1.33:1:1.33 (or 1.67:1:1.67) (at 0 dB) and 1:1 (at −20 dB). In contrast to earlier vinyl disk noise reduction systems such as dbx disc, High-Com II or CX 20, the system deliberately limited the reduced disk noise by about 10 to 12 dB(A) only, an amount similar to what could be achieved by other compander systems where only the receiving side of the medium was exposed to users and therefore the system had to remain playback compatible with a large installed base of devices without corresponding decoder (such as Dolby FM or High Com FM in radio broadcasting).

In fact, the results were found so good that, especially for records produced with Direct Metal Mastering (DMM) (but not exclusively), the system was undocumentedly introduced into the market by the East-German VEB Deutsche Schallplatten through record labels such as Amiga, Eterna and Nova (Note: As of May 2021, the Discogs database lists vinyl records with "CU" in the runout code for Amiga (1983^{[B]}–1987), Eterna (1983^{[B]}–1988) and Nova (1985–1987). It also lists records marked "DU" for Eterna (1986–1990).^{[C]}) since 1983/1984, (Note: The Hohmuth (1987) source states that the UC system was introduced into the market in 1984, whereas the Wonneberg (2000) source states 1983 as the year of introduction. The Discogs database lists some UC compressed records with runout codes indicating disk mastering years starting 1983.^{[D]}) with UC-encoded records only identifiable by a shy extra "U" engraving in the disk's silent inner groove area. (Note: UC compressed records are indicated in the record's matrix code engraved in the silent inner groove area of the record. The last one or two letters following the catalog number block and date code can be either "C" (Kupferschnitt, for copper cutting), "U" (for UC compression being used) or "CU" (both).^{[E]}^{[F]} (Discogs lists a number of other letters as well.) The letter combination "DU" (presumably for Direct Metal Mastering (DMM) or "digital recording" combined with UC compression) was used as well.^{[G]} The general scheme used for the runout code between 1971 and 1990 is "c cc ccc - pv myy [s]s [x]x" (sometimes followed by some more letters or digits) with c = catalog code, p = record page, v = version, m = letter code for month, y = 2-digit year (for 19yy), s = staff?, x = properties (incomplete list of letter combinations: "N" = Neumann VMS/SX combination?, "NT" = Neumann with tracing generator?, "M" = ?, "MT" = ?, "C" = copper cut, "CU" = copper cut with UC compression, "D" = DMM or digital?, "DT" = DMM or digital with tracing generator?, "DU" = DMM or digital with UC compression, "U" or "□U" = UC compression). An example picture of a copper cut UC compressed record ("F85 EN CU") can be found in the Müller (2018) source.) Up to 1990, over 500 UC-encoded titles were produced.

The economical necessities in the former GDR, however, made it impossible to introduce a suitable UC decoder at the same time. Prototypes of a HMK-D100-based tape recorder with digital counter and UC expander seem to have existed in 1987. Finally, a UC expander was built into the Ziphona HMK-PA2223, a tangential arm direct drive turntable manufactured by VEB Phonotechnik Pirna/Zittau in limited zero batch quantities only around 1989. The expander was based on a RFT/HFO A274[D], the East-German equivalent to the voltage-controlled electronic potentiometer IC Valvo/Philips TCA740[A].

The German reunification and the advances in digital home audio equipment put an end to the further introduction of the system in 1990.

Given the revival of vinyl records, the re-introduction of UC and the development of corresponding compander hardware based on modern semiconductors has been considered several times around 1994/1995 and 2009/2010.

A software decoder for UC has been implemented.

== See also ==
- dbx disc
- CX (Compatible Expansion)
- High-Com II
- RMS (Rauschminderungssystem), an unrelated tape noise reduction system used in the GDR in the 1980s
- Vinyl disc noise reduction systems
