= VEB Deutsche Schallplatten =

Music publisher in the German Democratic Republic

The VEB Deutsche Schallplatten was the monopolistic music publisher in the German Democratic Republic (GDR) from the 1950s until the 1980s.

The VEB Deutsche Schallplatten owned Amiga from 1954 to 1990.

== History ==
On August 12, 1946, the German singer and actor Ernst Busch got permission by Soviet military administration to institute a publishing house for music.

Originally called "Lieder der Zeit Musikverlag", VEB Deutsche Schallplatten was founded in 1947 by Ernst Busch, a socialist singer and actor.

On April 1, 1953, the private GmbH-company had to change to a state-controlled VEB (Volkseigener Betrieb, "People-owned enterprise").

On March 18, 1955, the VEB Lied Der Zeit was renamed to VEB Deutsche Schallplatten Berlin.

In 1990, it became Deutsche Schallplatten GmbH Berlin (DSB).

== Labels ==
Labels of VEB Deutsche Schallplatten included:

- Amiga for contemporary pop, rock music and jazz
- Eterna for classical music, operas, operettas
- Litera for radio plays, poetry readings
- Nova for contemporary art music
- Aurora for workers' songs and productions by Ernst Busch
- Schola for educational material

After 1990, some of these labels were sold to other music companies.

== See also ==
- List of record labels
- UC compander, a noise reduction system undocumentedly used on many DMM vinyl records by Eterna, Amiga and Nova in the 1980s.
