= Thomas Ryan (musician) =

Irish-American musician

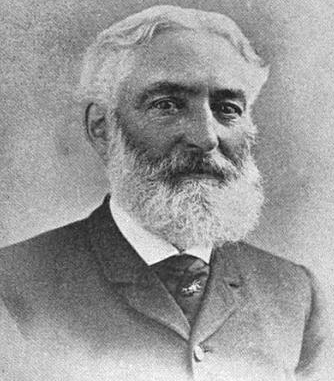
Portrait of Thomas Ryan

Thomas Ryan (c. 1827 – 5 March 1903) was an Irish-American musician.

Born in Ireland, Ryan moved to the United States as a teenager in 1844, and pursued his studies in Boston. In 1849, he formed the Mendelssohn Quintette Club along with August Fries (1st violin), Francis Riha (2nd violin), Eduard Lehmann (viola and flute), and Wulf Fries (cello); Ryan played viola and clarinet. The Club gave its first concert in Boston on 14 December, at the showroom of Chickering & Sons. Ryan played with the Club for the next fifty years and was eventually the final remaining founding member.

He co-founded the National College of Music in 1872, headquartered at Boston's Tremont Temple. The college employed numerous musician instructors, and attracted a substantial student body. After the fire of November 1872, the college lost many of its students, who were no longer able to afford tuition, and closed in 1873. Ryan published his memoirs in Recollections of an Old Musician (1899).
