= Theodore Morse =

American songwriter (1873–1924)

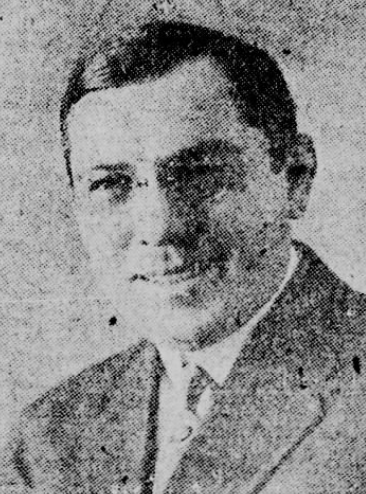
- Born: April 13, 1873; Washington, D.C.
- Died: May 25, 1924 (aged 51); New York City
- Education: Maryland Military and Naval Academy
- Occupation: Composer
- Spouse: Theodora Morse

Theodore F. Morse (April 13, 1873 – May 25, 1924) was an American composer of popular songs.

== Biography ==
Born in Washington, D.C., Morse was educated at the Maryland Military and Naval Academy. He went on to study both violin and piano. He and his wife, Theodora Morse, became a successful songwriting team for Tin Pan Alley. Listed as Terriss & Morse, they were one of the earliest Tin Pan Alley husband-wife songwriting teams.

Morse died from pneumonia in New York City on May 25, 1924.

His song "Blue Bell, the Dawn is Waking..." became popular in Germany shortly after WW1 due to its marching rhythm. In 1920, Erich Tessmer wrote German lyrics, and the song was performed by the Freikorps. Then the German Stormtroopers used it as their march with new lyrics "Kamerad, reich mir die Hände"; another version of the lyrics was used by their opponents, the Rotfront ("Hunger in allen Gassen"). When the Nazis came to power, they used the song as a Hitler Youth march with a newer version of lyrics "Deutschland, du Land der Treue".

== Partial list of songs ==
- 1902 "Two Little Boys", lyrics by Edward Madden
- 1903 "Dear Old Girl", lyrics by Richard Henry Buck
- 1903 "Nautical Nonsense (Hurrah for Baffin's Bay!)" from The Wizard of Oz, lyrics by Vincent Bryan
- 1903 "It Takes the Irish to Beat the Dutch", lyrics by Edward Madden
- 1904 "Blue Bell", lyrics by Edward Madden and Theodora Morse
- 1905 "Daddy's Little Girl", lyrics by Edward Madden
- 1907 "I Want to be a Merry, Merry Widow", lyrics by Edward Madden
- 1908 "Down in Jungle Town", lyrics by Edward Madden
- 1908 "I've Taken Quite a Fancy to You", lyrics by Edward Madden
- 1908 "The Old Time Rag", lyrics by Edward Madden
- 1908 "Stupid Mister Cupid", lyrics by Edward Madden
- 1909 "Blue Feather", lyrics by Jack Mahoney
- 1911 "Another Rag", lyrics by Theodora Morse
- 1911 "Auntie Skinner's Chicken Dinner" words and music by Earl Carroll, Arthur Fields & Theodore F. Morse
- 1913 "Down in Monkeyville", lyrics by Grant Clarke & Edgar Leslie
- 1913 "Salvation Nell", lyrics by Grant Clarke & Edgar Leslie
- 1915 "If They'd Only Fight the War with Wooden Soldiers", lyrics by Bert Fitzgibbon
- 1915 " M-O-T-H-E-R", lyrics by Howard Johnson
- 1915 "Soldier Boy, lyrics by D.A. Esrom
- 1916 "Good Old U.S.A.", lyrics by Jack Drislane
- 1917 "Hail! Hail! The Gang's All Here" with Arthur Sullivan (lyrics by D. A. Esrom)
- 1917 "My Red Cross Girlie (The Wound Is Somewhere in My Heart)", lyrics by Harry Bewley
- 1917 "Sing Me Love's Lullaby", lyrics by Theodora Morse (as Dorothy Terriss)
- 1917 "Our Lanky Yankee Boys in Brown", lyrics by Edward Madden and Robt. F. Roden
- 1917 "Throw No Stones in the Well That Gives You Water", lyrics by Arthur Fields
- 1917 "We'll Knock the Heligo - Into Heligo Out of Heligoland!", lyrics by John O'Brien
- 1918 "Mother Here's Your Boy" with Sidney D. Mitchell and Archie Gottler
- 1918 "When a Blue Service Star Turns to Gold", lyrics by Casper Nathan
- 1918 "When I get Back to My American Blighty", lyrics by Arthur Fields
- 1923 "Cut Yourself a Piece of Cake", lyrics by Billy James
- 1924 "Don't Blame It All on Me", lyrics by Theodora Morse & Leo Wood
- 1924 "Monkey Doodle", lyrics by Theodora Morse & Leo Wood

(all music by him only unless when stated otherwise)

== See also ==
- How much wood would a woodchuck chuck
