= Dorothy Jardon =

American singer

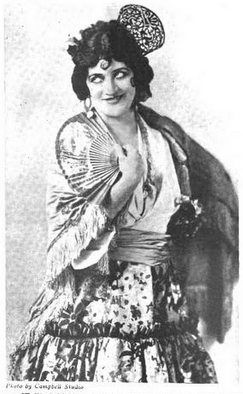
- Jardon as "Carmen", from a 1922 publication
- Born: Mary Jardon; June 1, 1883; New York City, New York, U.S.
- Died: September 30, 1966 (age 83); Los Angeles, California, U.S.
- Occupations: Singer, actress
- Spouse: Edward Madden (lyricist)

Dorothy Jardon (born Mary Jardon; June 1, 1883 – September 30, 1966) was an American soprano and actress. She was sometimes billed as "the American Carmen".

== Early life and education ==
Jardon was born in New York, the daughter of Ignace Jardon, a chef who immigrated to the United States from France in 1864, and Bridget Mary Jardon (née Kavanagh), who immigrated from Ireland in 1884. She studied voice with William S. Brady.

== Career ==
Jardon's Broadway credits included roles in the shows The Fisher Maiden (1903), The Merry-Go-Round (1908), The Yankee Girl (1910), Madame Sherry (1910–1911), La Belle Paree (1911), Bow-Sing (1911), The Revue of Revues (1911), The Wedding Trip (1911–1912), The Pleasure Seekers (1913–1914), The Dancing Duchess (1914), Papa's Darling (1914–1915). She sang with the Chicago Opera in the title role of Fedora in 1919. She was billed as "the American Carmen" after Fortune Gallo cast her in the role in 1922.

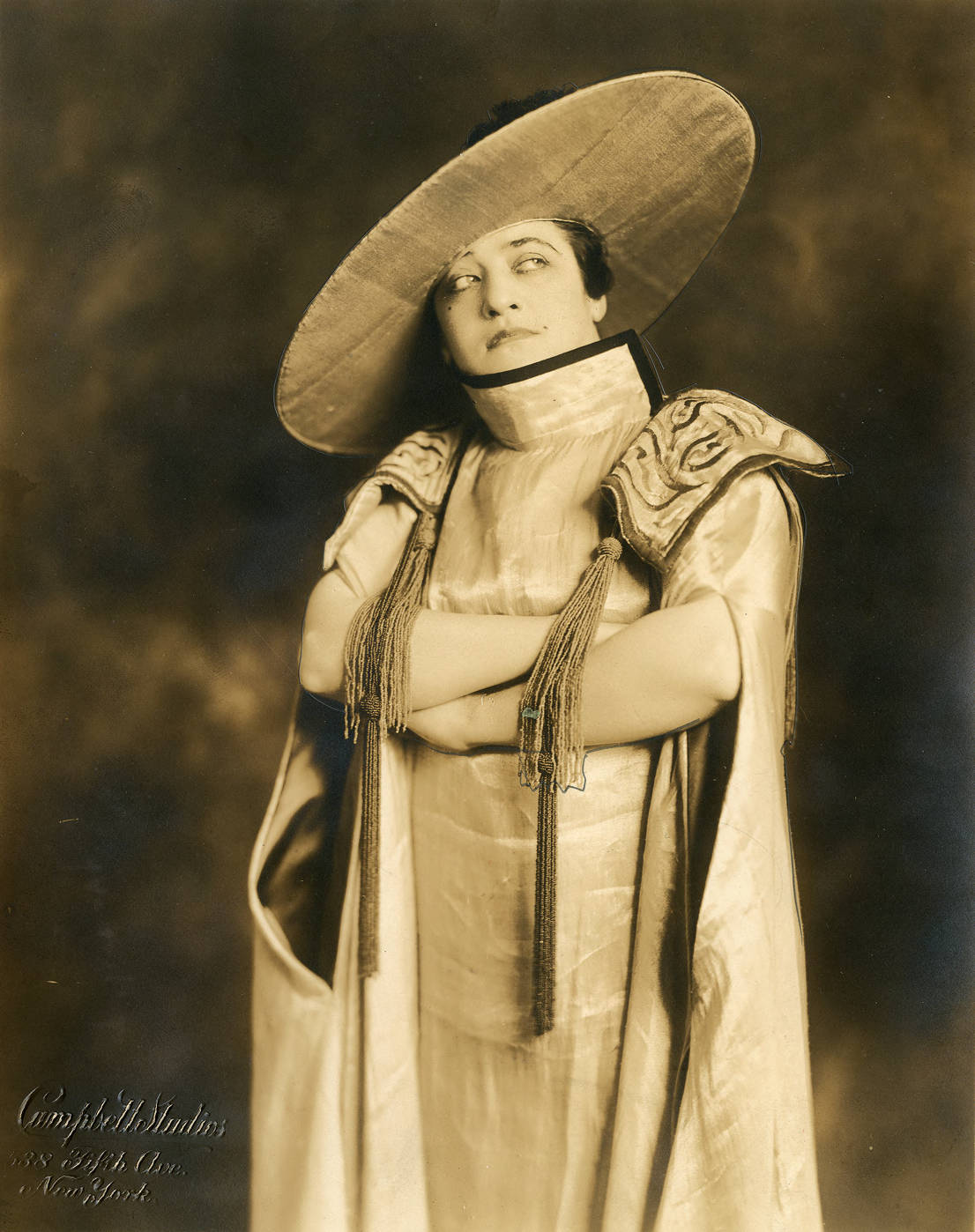
Dorothy Jardon in costume, from the Sayre Collection

Jardon made several recordings for Victor and Brunswick labels. Among her acting credits, she played Bimoula in Oh! Oh! Delphine! at the Shaftesbury Theatre in London in 1913. Charles Wakefield Cadman wrote "Love Like the Dawn Came Stealing" for Jardon.

Jardon was considered a fashionable stage beauty, and her gowns were described in detail in the press. "It isn't mere prettiness of face and body that Dorothy Jardon has. It is downright knock-you-dead beauty. She's a smothered-in-red-roses, drenched-with-Russian-perfume exotic," explained an interviewer in 1917, adding that Jardon "makes Theda Bara look like a glass of milk." She was especially known for her "beautiful back", and wore gowns with low-cut backs to highlight that feature.

Jardon retired from the stage in 1927.

== Personal life ==
Jardon was married twice. Her first husband was songwriter Edward Michael Madden. Her second husband was Harry Edmond Oelrichs; they married in 1928. Her son Edward became a singer, and later a brewery executive. She died in Los Angeles in 1966, at the age of 83.
