= Poolie Pride =

"Poolie Pride" is a single released by the Monkey Hangerz in 2005, a group of Hartlepool United fans. The single contained three tracks: "Two Little Boys", "Never Say Die" and "Hartlepool and the Monkey".

The single was organised by a group of Hartlepool United fans led by John McQue, who co-organised the project, and Phil Dunn who arranged the musical aspects of the record. The Monkey Hangerz achieved a Top 30 hit in the UK Singles Chart independently of any record label or distribution company. It also reached number 8 in the UK Indie Chart.

The idea was born after 'Pools' appeared in the Football League One play-off final at the Millennium Stadium in Cardiff; the idea was thought of on a Hartlepool fan forum and the project took off from there.

Profits from the sale of the single went to the Hartlepool United Youth Development Program and The Soundwaves Project (a local young people’s music initiative).
