= Soldier Boy (1915 song) =

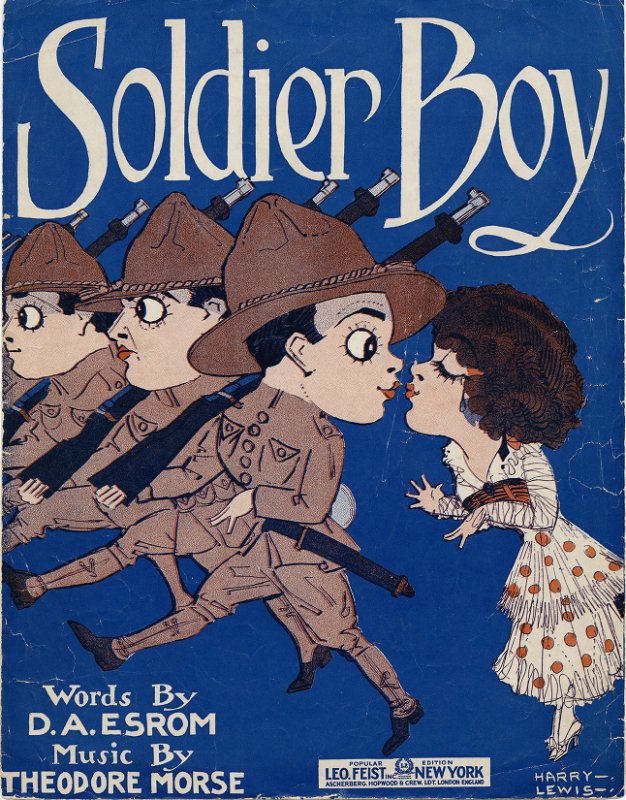
- sheet music cover for "Soldier Boy"

Song
- Released: January 1, 1915
- Label: Leo Feist, Inc.
- Composer(s): Theodore Morse
- Lyricist(s): D.A. Esrom

Soldier Boy is a World War I era song released in 1915. D.A. Esrom wrote the lyrics. Theodore Morse composed the music. Leo Feist, Inc. of New York, New York published the song. Artist Harry Lewis designed the cover art for the sheet music. On the cover, there are three cartoon soldiers. One has his head turned to kiss a woman behind him. The song was written for both voice and piano. It is told from the point of view of a woman who is proud of her soldier boy. She addresses the soldier directly in the chorus:

Soldier boy,
One kiss before you go, soldier boy
I'll miss you, that you know,
Ev'ry night I'll pray for you far away,
And trust to Him above
To send you back some day
In my heart
A love will always yearn,
And I'll wait for your return.
So go and fight for the cause you know is right,
God bless you, my soldier boy.

The sheet music can be found at Pritzker Military Museum & Library
