= Frances Hawks Cameron Burnett =

American socialite

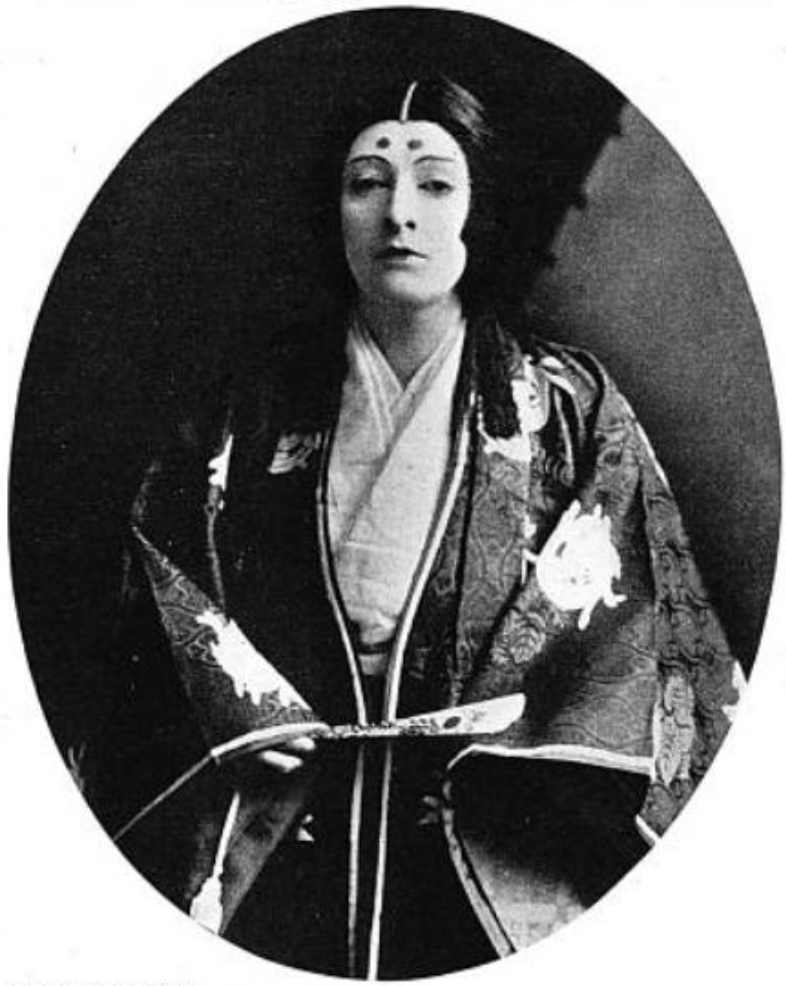
- Frances Hawks Cameron Burnett posing in a Japanese-inspired historical ensemble, from a 1921 publication
- Born: February 6, 1884; Selma, Alabama, US
- Died: October 10, 1957 (aged 73); Alexandria, Louisiana, US
- Occupations: Socialite, political hostess, writer

Frances Hawks Cameron Burnett (February 6, 1884 – October 10, 1957) was an American socialite and political hostess. While in Japan as a diplomat's wife, she helped to organize the Japan Humane Society and was active in supporting the Boy Scouts of Japan. She was also the first foreigner to take honors in an annual Japanese poetry competition when she placed fourth in 1921.

== Early life and education ==
Cameron was born in Selma, Alabama, the daughter of Francis H. Cameron and Eugenie LeGrand Weaver Cameron. Her father was a military officer. His family, the Camerons, were prominent slaveholders in the antebellum American South, and her kin on that side included judge Paul C. Cameron and Virginia governor William E. Cameron. Her great-uncle was politician Francis L. Hawks, first president of Tulane University.

== Career ==
Burnett lived in Japan with her diplomat husband on various assignments from 1911 to 1929, including during and after the 1923 Great Kantō earthquake. Because she was recovering from spinal tuberculosis and needed physical rest, she focused on learning to speak, read and write in Japanese. She made literary translations and wrote original poetry in Japanese. She helped to organize the Junior Humane Society of Tokyo, and was president of the organization. She was the first foreigner to take honors in the Annual Imperial Poetry Reading Competition, when she placed fourth in 1921 with her poem, "Before the Shrine of Ise at Dawn". In 1927 she was appointed an honorary councilor of the Boy Scouts of Japan.

Burnett decorated her Vermont summer home with Japanese art and furnishings, and wore Japanese clothing to entertain. She spoke to American audiences about Japanese culture. She continued writing poetry in Japanese into the 1930s, while her husband was stationed at Fort Ethan Allen in Vermont and commandant of Fort Oglethorpe in Georgia. "The poetry of the land of cherry blossoms is as stimulating to me now as when I live[d] in the land of the pale, beautiful flowers," she explained in 1937. "Each week I write several poems to mail back to Japan."

== Publications ==
- "The Spirit of Japanese Poetry" (1920)
- 日星帖 (1921)
- "Kindness to Animals in Japan" (1927)

== Personal life and legacy ==
Cameron married Charles Burnett, an American military attaché, in 1905. Her husband died in 1939, and she died in 1957, at the age of 73, in Alexandria, Louisiana. There is a significant collection of her papers in the Library of Congress.
