= Direct metal mastering =

Analog audio disc mastering technique

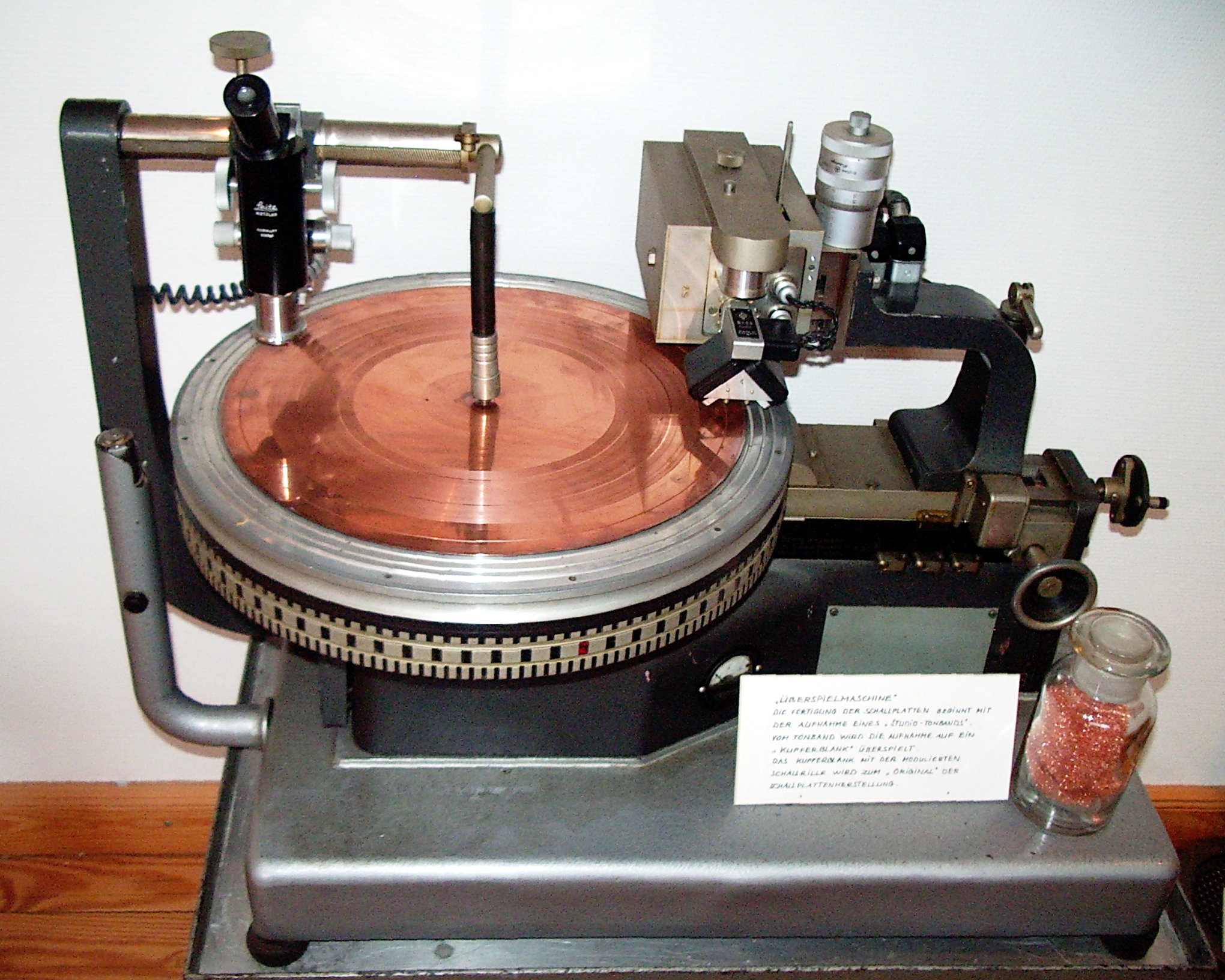
DMM copper disc sitting on the turntable of a Neumann AM32 lacquer cutting lathe, built in the 1930s

Direct metal mastering (DMM) is an analog audio disc mastering technique jointly developed by two German companies, Telefunken-Decca (Teldec) and Georg Neumann GmbH, toward the end of the 20th century after having seen the same technology used by RCA Princeton Labs for its SelectaVision videodiscs in the late 1970s.

Records manufactured with this technology are often marked by a "DMM" logo on the outer record sleeve. Many current production high quality pressings, as well as standard production LPs from the 1990s, only indicate its use by inscribing "DMM" in the lead-out groove area of the disc.

Neumann was responsible for manufacturing the actual DMM cutting equipment as part of its VMS80 series lathes.

== Overview ==
The advantages of DMM (hard surface material) over acetate lacquer cutting (soft surface material) are both sonic and practical: because of the rigidity of the master disc medium, no groove wall bounce-back effects take place after the cutting has been completed. This preserves the original modulation details in the groove walls much better, especially those involved with sudden fast attacks (transients). The improved transient response, as well as the more linear phase response of DMM improve the overall stability and depth-of-field in the stereo image. In addition, disturbing adjacent groove print-through sounds (groove echoes) are reduced in DMM. Also, there is no need to rush the finalized master disc directly into a refrigerator for groove preservation, as in conventional lacquer disc cutting, before processing the master disc to produce matrices for the pressing of the records. Finally, only one electroplating generation is required to produce stampers, as opposed to three for conventional lacquer masters.

The cutting lathe for DMM engraves the audio signal directly onto a copper-plated master disc, instead of engraving the groove into a lacquer-coated aluminum disc. Examination of early DMM discs revealed what appeared to be a high frequency modulation in the groove, thought to be caused by the use of an ultrasonic carrier tone. In fact, there was no carrier tone and the modulation was simply caused by the vibration (squeal) of the cutter head as it was dragged through the copper disc.

Unlike conventional disc mastering, where the mechanical audio modulation is cut onto a lacquer-coated aluminum disc, DMM cuts straight into metal (copper), utilizing a high frequency carrier system and specialized diamond styli, vibrating at 60 kHz to facilitate the cutting.

The DMM copper master disc can be plated to produce the required number of stampers using the one-step plating process. Rather than having to electroform a master (or "father"), mother and then stampers (the traditional "three-step process"), the DMM copper disc serves as the 'mother". Bypassing the silvering process and two electroforming stages reduces the risk of introducing noise that can be generated in the electroforming (galvanic) process. In cases where hundreds of stampers may be required, the DMM disc is often used as a mandrel to electroform a master and mother, from which many stampers are then made. Chemical passivation of the metal surface of each part precludes "plating," so the parts can be mechanically separated from each other upon removal from the tank.

Since the sale of Neumann to German microphone manufacturer Sennheiser, Neumann no longer produces lathes or supplies parts. Since DMM was introduced at the very end of the vinyl age, only about 30 DMM lathes were ever made, compared to hundreds of lacquer lathes from various manufacturers, and about 10 of them were later converted to be used for conventional lacquer cutting. The lathes in use today are kept operational by independent service consultants, as well as cutting room personnel themselves, often by buying incomplete lathes and stripping them for parts.

The DMM specification also includes a profile for the pressing of 12-inch records. To the naked eye, this profile has no obvious contour on the face of the record giving the appearance of a totally flat-faced record. For the purpose of compression moulding, which is the process by which records are pressed, the face of the record does indeed have a contour and a cross-sectional view of a 12-inch record will reveal that it is wedge shaped from the centre to the edge. The lack of obvious contour in the groove area on the face of the record closely replicates the original disc surface and reduces playback errors. Pressing records with this profile was mandatory for a record to bear the "DMM" logo. DMM licensees that did not use this profile were unable to use the DMM logo on its products, but were of course free to use terms such as "Mastered on Copper" as did EMI Australia when not using the DMM-profiled moulds or when cutting a DMM master for another record manufacturer. The best example of a DMM pressing can usually be found on the Teldec (Germany) or EMI (UK) labels from the early 1980s.

The decline of vinyl records in favour of the compact disc, saw many Neumann VMS82 DMM lathes converted for cutting lacquer discs as few plants were able to process DMM masters and so many disc cutting facilities conformed to the industry standard – cutting on lacquer.

As of 2009 there are seven publicly-usable DMM cutting facilities left in the world, all located in Germany, Netherlands, or Czech Republic. The US lost its last DMM cutting facility in 2005 with the demise of New York City-based record manufacturer Europadisk LLC. Europadisk's DMM lathe was sold at auction to the Church of Scientology for US $72,500.

The DMM concept was a spin-off of RCA's SelectaVision development of CED videodisc recording equipment both in Indianapolis as well as the David Sarnoff Research Facility in Princeton, New Jersey, who traded it to Teldec for other research it used in other capacities. After further development, Teldec attempted to sell its DMM technology back to RCA, however RCA was not interested. Therefore, as a result, all DMM titles from RCA and subsidiary labels were all mastered elsewhere.

Although Neumann produced, demonstrated and promoted a successful prototype CD Mastering unit for DMM, it never went into commercial production. Most of the remaining original spare parts were purchased from Neumann by the UK disc cutting consultant Sean Davies, who carried on repair maintenance of existing systems since Neumann stopped production.

== Advantages and disadvantages ==
The direct metal mastering technology addresses the lacquer mastering technology's issue of pre-echoes during record play, caused by the cutting stylus unintentionally transferring some of the subsequent groove wall's impulse signal into the previous groove wall. In particular, a quiet passage followed by a loud sound often clearly revealed a faint pre-echo of the loud sound occurring 1.8 seconds ahead of time (the duration of one revolution at 33 rpm). This problem could also appear as post-echo, 1.8 seconds after a peak in volume.

Another improvement is noise reduction. The lacquer mastering method bears a higher risk of adding unwanted random noise to the recording, caused by the enclosure of small dust particles when spraying the silvering on the lacquer master, which is the necessary first step of the electroplating process for reproduction of the master disc. As the DMM master disc is already made of metal (copper), this step is not required, and its faults are avoided.

With the groove being cut straight into a metal foil, DMM therefore reduces the number of plating stages in the manufacturing process.

DMM is not without potential disadvantages as well. DMM LP pressings are sometimes described as having a harshness or forwardness in the high frequencies. The fact the groove is cut to copper, a hard metal, and not to soft lacquer, nitrocellulose, supposedly endows DMM vinyl LP with a very different tonality to traditionally manufactured vinyl LP pressings. Direct metal mastering requires a radically different cutting angle than traditional (lacquer) cutting, almost 0 degrees. However the playback cartridges will always have the standard playback angle of 15–22.5°. Thus, the DMM process includes electronic audio processing so the records can be played with a standard cartridge despite having been cut at a substantially different angle. This electronic processing might account for the supposedly different high frequency "signature sound" of DMM records.

== Digital recordings ==
A similar technique, developed by Teldec is used for digital records on CDs and DVDs.

== See also ==
- Acetate discs
- Production of phonograph records
- UC compander, a noise reduction system undocumentedly used on many DMM vinyl records produced by several East-German record labels in the 1980s.

== General Reading ==
- Eargle, John. Handbook of Recording Engineering. New York: Springer, 2006. ISBN 978-0-387-28471-2
- http://www.avforums.com/forums/hi-fi-systems-separates/1388272-dmm-vinyl.html
- List of companies currently offering DMM
