= It Takes the Irish to Beat the Dutch =

Song performed by Billy Murray

"It Takes the Irish to Beat the Dutch" is a song written in 1913 by Edward Madden and Theodore Morse.

The song has several verses, each of them filled with stereotypical Irish bragging about their supposed superiority to Germans ("Dutch" in old-fashioned terminology). The chorus is in the form of a limerick. Sample lyric:

The Germans are a mighty race improving every year
They lead the world in science, sauerkraut, and lager beer
But there's a race surpassing them in this world and the next
And on the tomb of Germany someday you'll read this text

It takes the Irish to beat the Dutch
What the Irish can't accomplish it don't amount to much
With their scientific tricks
They could never fool the Micks
You can bet it takes the Irish to beat the Dutch
