= Always Leave Them Laughing When You Say Goodbye =

Song by George M. Cohan

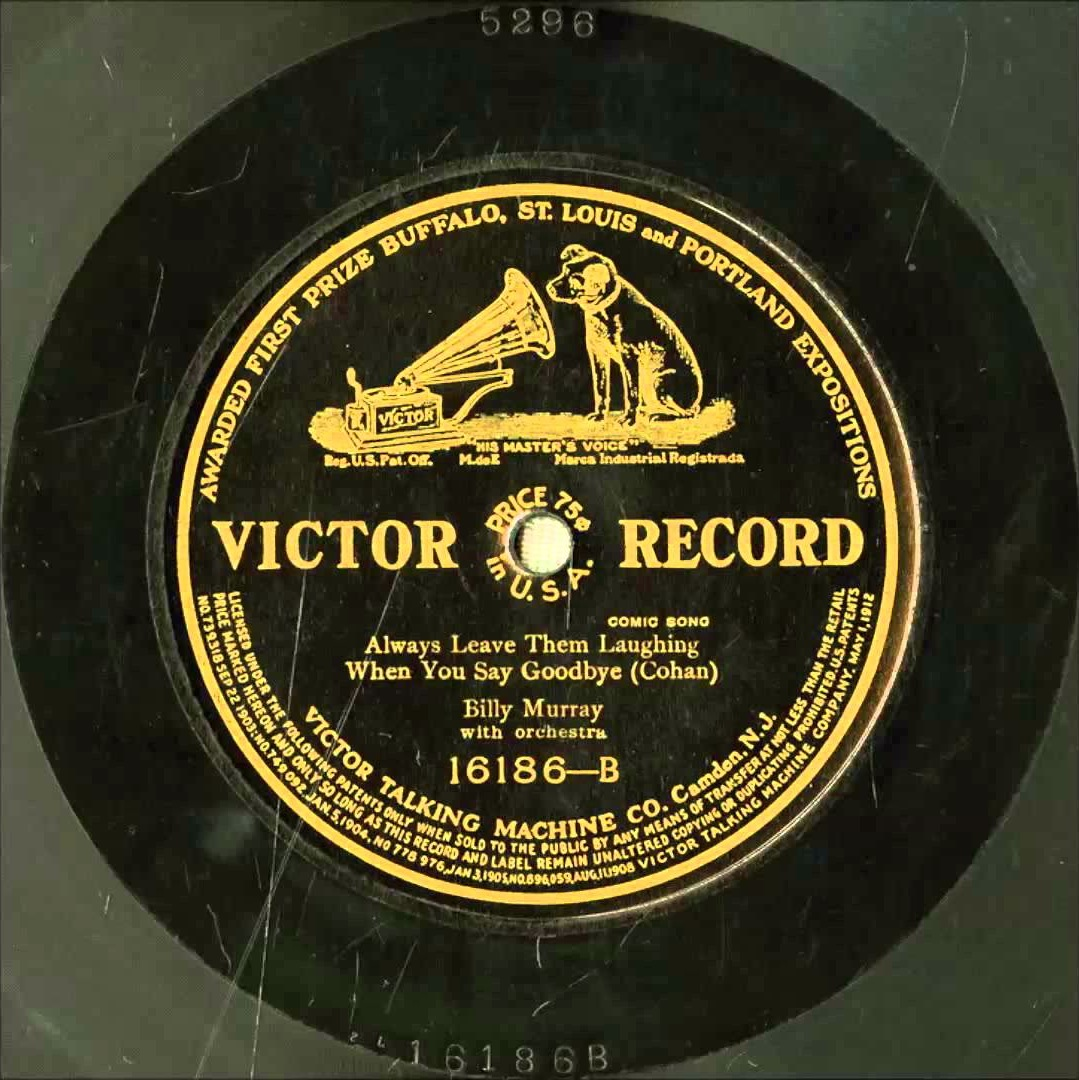
The published record

"Always Leave Them Laughing When You Say Goodbye" was a popular song, first published in 1903, and written by George M. Cohan. Today, the best-known recording of the song is by Billy Murray, recorded in 1907 with Victor Records, whose version has entered the public domain. It was very popular in the early half of the 20th century, but its recognition has decreased since its heyday.

== See also ==
- 1903 in music
- 1907 in music
- Billy Murray (singer)
