= Edward Madden (lyricist) =

American lyricist (1878–1952)

- Born: Edward Madden; July 17, 1878; New York City, New York, United States
- Died: March 11, 1952 (age 73); Hollywood, California, United States
- Occupation: Lyricist

Edward Madden (July 17, 1878 – March 11, 1952) was an American lyricist.

== Early life ==
Madden was born in New York City and graduated from Fordham University. After graduation, he wrote for singers including Fanny Brice, as well as for vaudeville acts. Later, he would write songs for Broadway.

== Career ==
During his career, Madden worked with Ben Jerome, Dorothy Jardon, Joseph Daly, Gus Edwards, Julian Edwards, Louis Hirsch, Theodore Morse, Percy Wenrich and Jerome Kern.

Madden produced such standards as “By the Light of the Silvery Moon”, “On Moonlight Bay”, “Down in Jungle Town”, “Blue Bell”, “Look Out for Jimmy Valentine”, “Aren't You the Wise Ole Owl”, “My Only One”, “What Could Be Sweeter?”, “The World Can't Go ‘Round Without You”, “Red Rose Rag”, “Silver Bell”, “Arra Wanna”, “I've Got a Feelin' for You”, “A Little Boy Called Taps”, "It Takes the Irish to Beat the Dutch" and “I'd Rather Be a Lobster Than a Wise Guy”. He and composer Theodore Morse wrote the American Civil War song "Two Little Boys".

Madden's songs have been included in several films, including Turn Back the Clock, Babes in Arms, Tin Pan Alley, Bullets for O'Hara, Birth of the Blues, Ship Ahoy, Paris is a Paradise for Coons, On Moonlight Bay and By the Light of the Silvery Moon. He was also a contributing lyricist to several Broadway musicals, including Lonesome Town (1908), The-Merry-Go-Round (1908), the Ziegfeld Follies of 1909, and Little Boy Blue (1912) among others.

Madden was inducted into the Songwriters Hall of Fame in 1970.

== Personal life ==
Madden married his colleague, Dorothy Jardon. He had a son, Edward Madden Jr.

== Death ==
Madden died in Hollywood, California in March 1952 at the age of 73.
