= Pyrox Wire Recorder =

Australian 1940s audio recording device

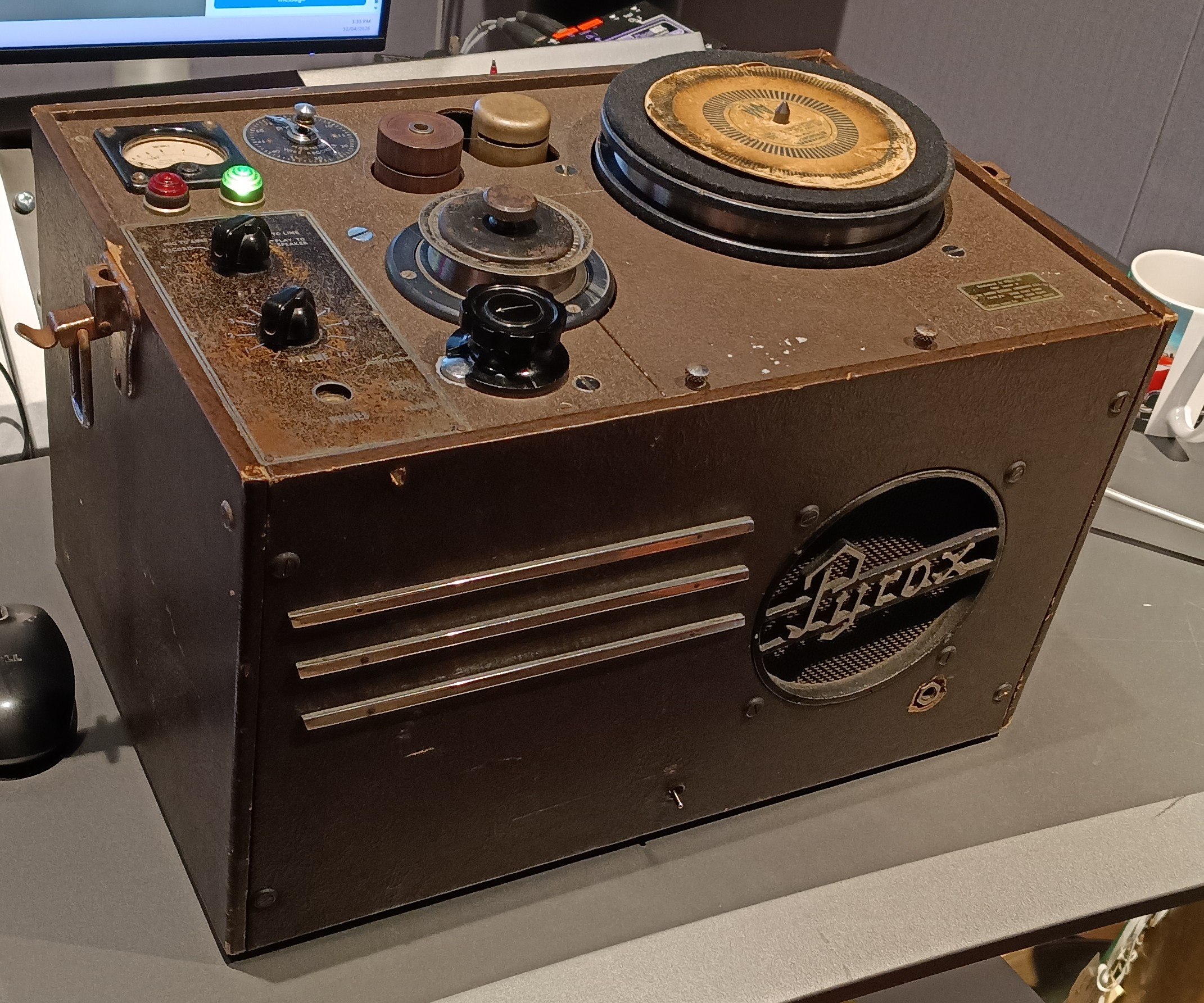
A Pyrox Wire Recorder at Australia's National Film and Sound Archive

Pyrox Pty Ltd was an Australian precision engineering firm with offices in Melbourne. In 1947 they released their wire recorder, manufactured under licence to the Armour Research Foundation, of Chicago, Illinois.

The Pyrox Wire Recorder is an Australian wire recorder with audio recording and playback abilities. It was a pre-World War II predecessor to the tape recorder. The most portable version weighed 22 kilograms. The device utilises a 7,800 feet (2,400 m) long reel of magnetic stainless steel wire capable of having an audio signal encoded onto it. For distribution, the wire can be taken into a studio and the recording dubbed on to an acetate disc.

The recorder is self-contained in a box with a foot pedal attachment used for control. The thin stainless steel wire records for one hour. Recording automatically erases any existing content and replaces it with the new recording. Reels have a lifetime of 200,000 cycles, and can be stored indefinitely.

The device was used by the Churches of Christ in Victoria in the 1950s during home mission activities. Children felt "utter astonishment" when their recorded voices and singing were played back to them.
