= 45 rpm adapter =

Device for playing records

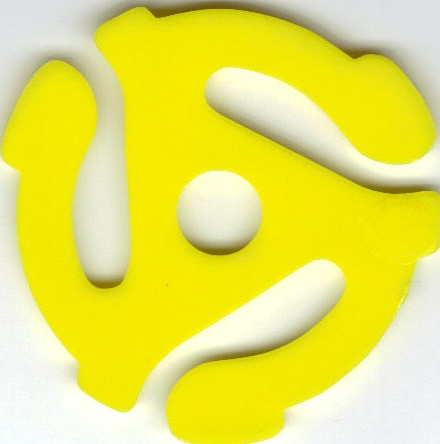
A plastic 45 rpm adapter that inserts into the large spindle hole of a 45 rpm record

A 45 rpm adapter (also known as a 45 rpm record insert, 45 rpm spindle adapter, spider, or 7-inch adapter in reference to the usual size of a 45 rpm record) is a small plastic or metal insert that goes in the middle of a 45-rpm record so it can be played on the standard size spindle of a turntable. The adapter may be a small solid circle that fits onto the spindle (meaning only one 45 could be played at a time) or a larger adapter that fits over the entire spindle of a record changer, permitting a stack of 45s to be played. These larger adapters allowing multiple records to be played are often referred to as 45 spindles. A few manufacturers instead supplied a complete spindle change for 45s.

== History ==
The first 45 rpm inserts were introduced by the Webster-Chicago Corporation, also known as Webcor. They were made of solid zinc, difficult to insert into a record, and almost impossible to remove without breaking the disc. A differently shaped, but similarly difficult-to-use metal adapter was made by Fidelitone.

Capitol Records for a time produced what they called "Optional Center" or "O.C. 45" records. These had a triangular section molded in with an LP-size spindle hole that could be punched out for playing on 45 rpm spindles. Some records from EMI and other British record labels have a similar feature. The EMI version is circular, with four small notches holding the center part onto the rest of the record.

The former RCA Corporation introduced a snap-in plastic insert known as a spider to make 45 rpm records compatible with the smaller spindle size of a 33 1/3 rpm LP record player. The Hutchison adapter included small bumps called "drive pins," which locked the adapters together while revolving to prevent stacked records from slipping against each other. Several manufacturers made "spider" adapters in slightly varying shapes and many different colors, though yellow and red were most frequently used.

== The SX2 ==
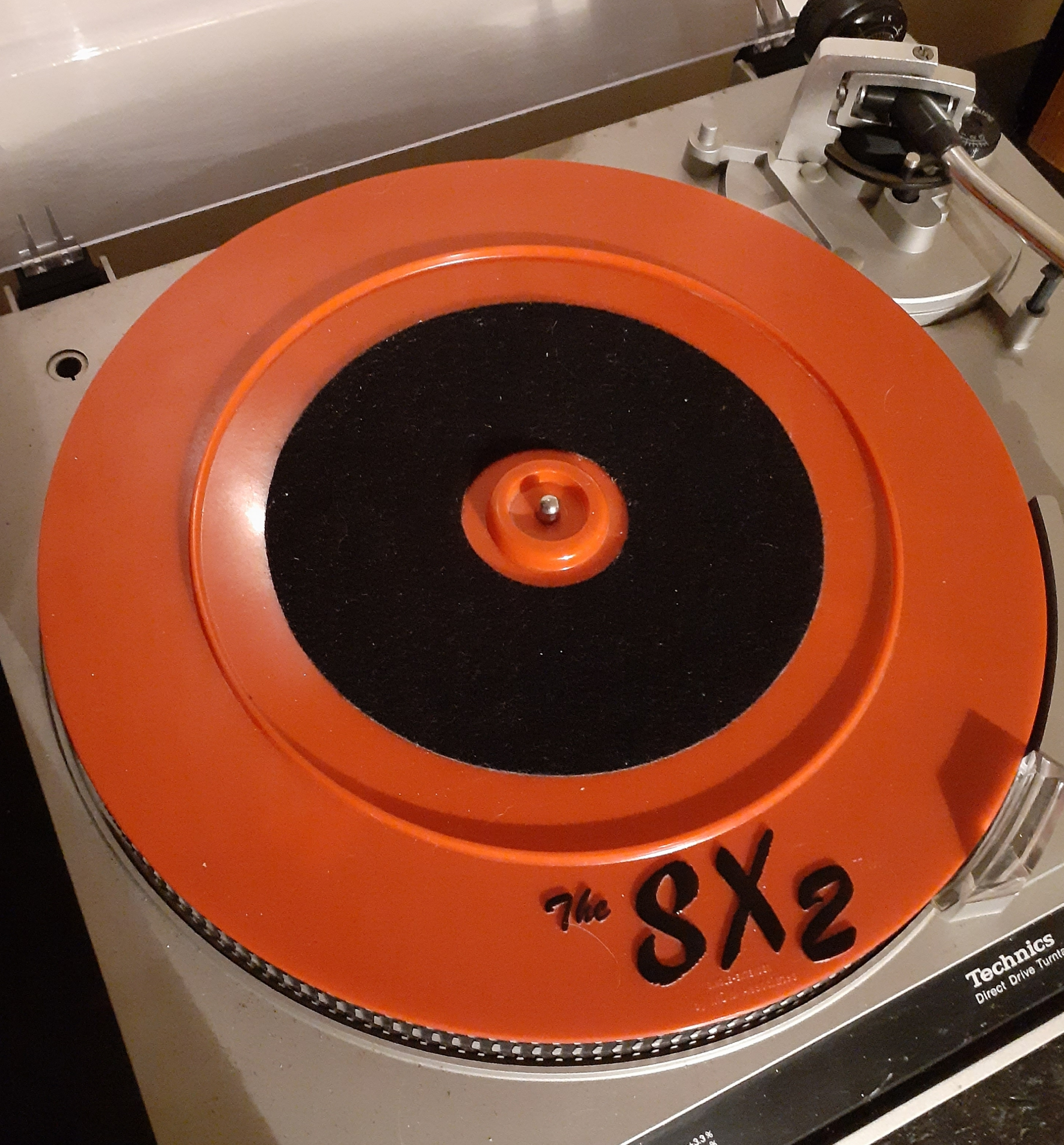
SX2 adapter

The SX2 and The Extender were designed and manufactured by Mark McLaughlan between the early 1980s and early 1990s. McLaughlan, a Boston area nightclub DJ, came up with the design to make 7" discs easier to handle when mixing. Due to its limited manufacturing run the SX2 has become a sought-after rarity among professional DJs.

== Gallery ==
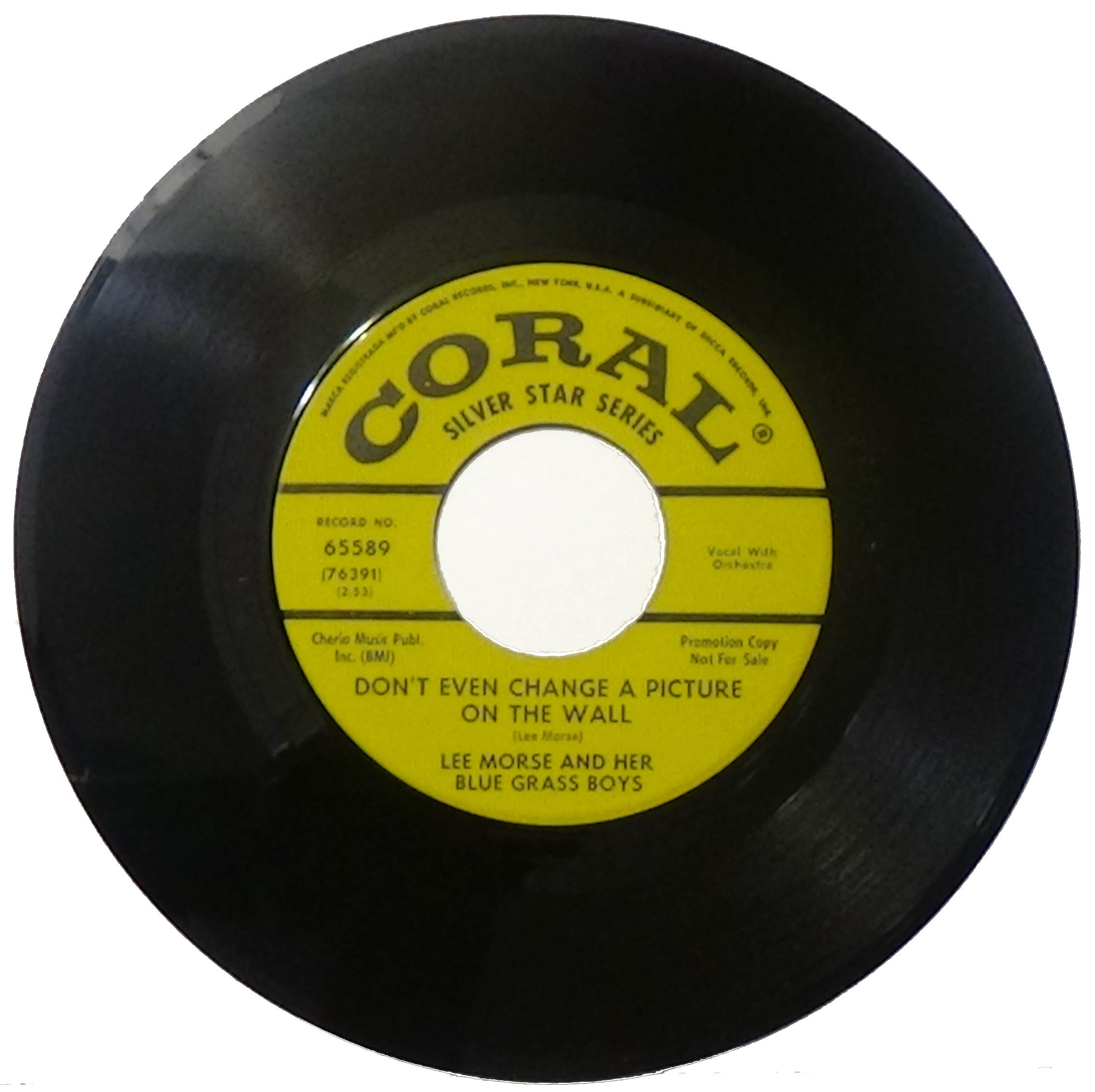
A 45 rpm record. To play the record, an adapter is placed in the large spindle hole in its center.

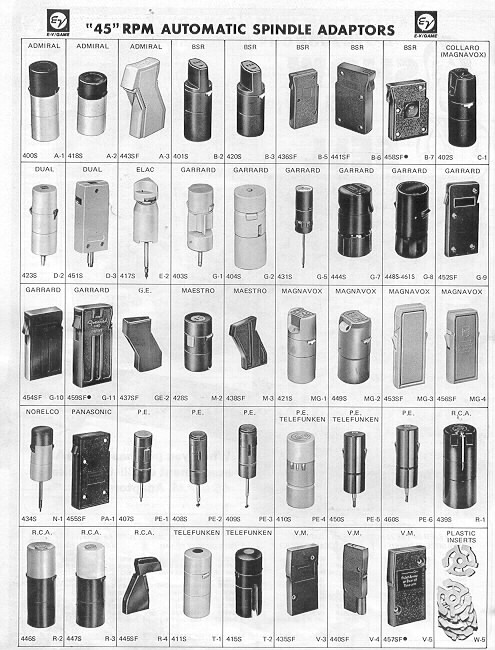
45 rpm automatic spindle adapters.

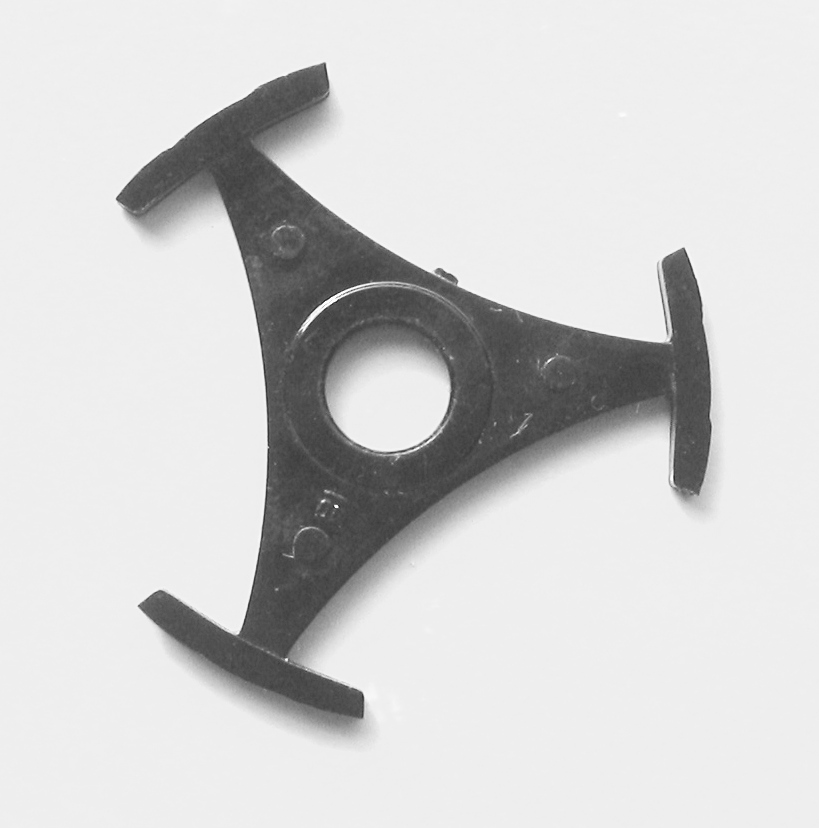

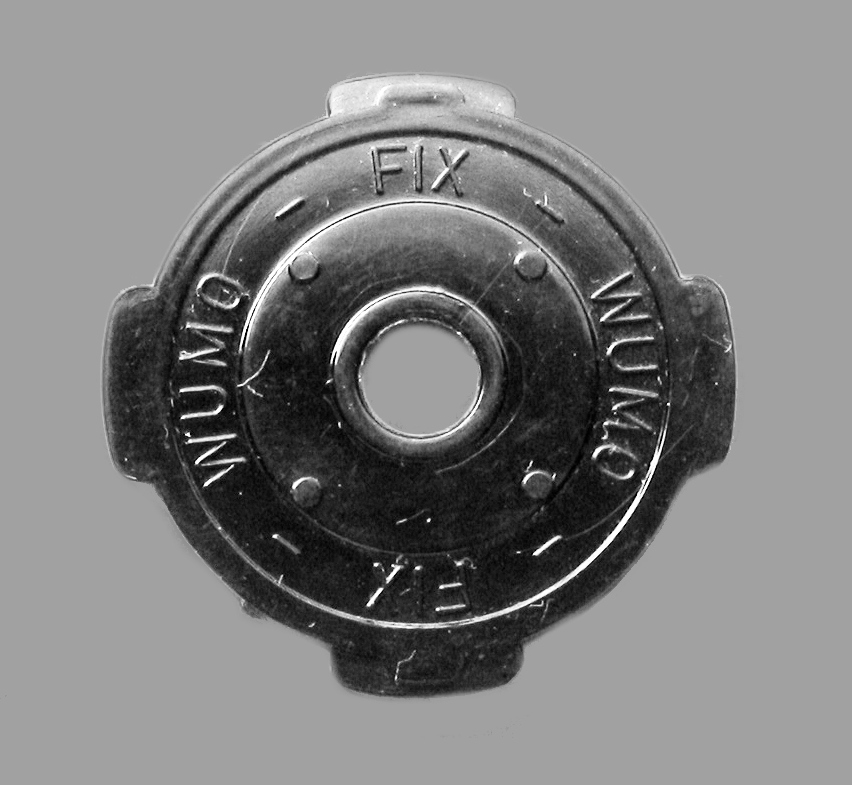

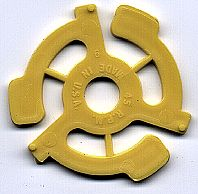

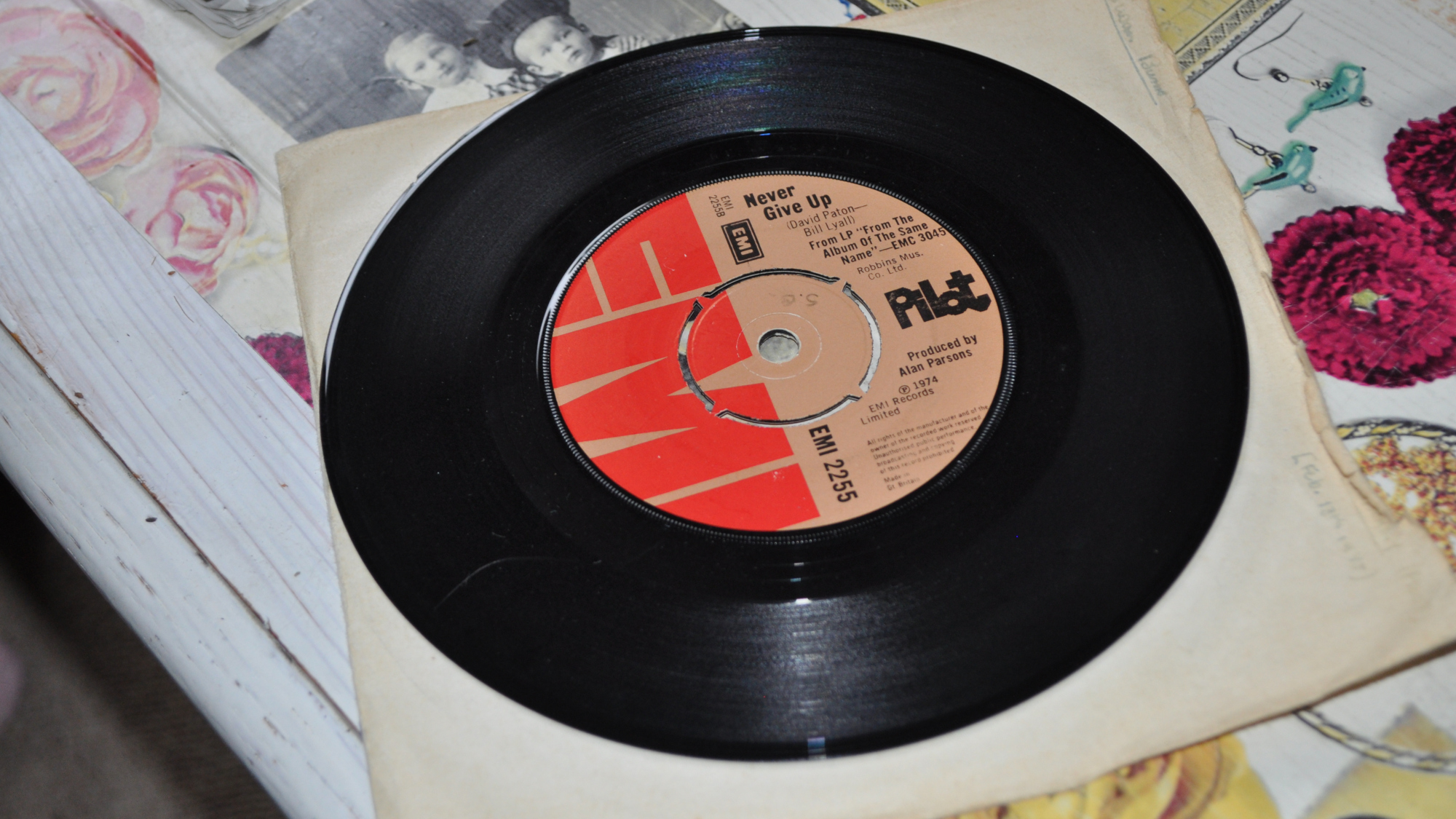
EMI record with pressed-in spindle adaptor.

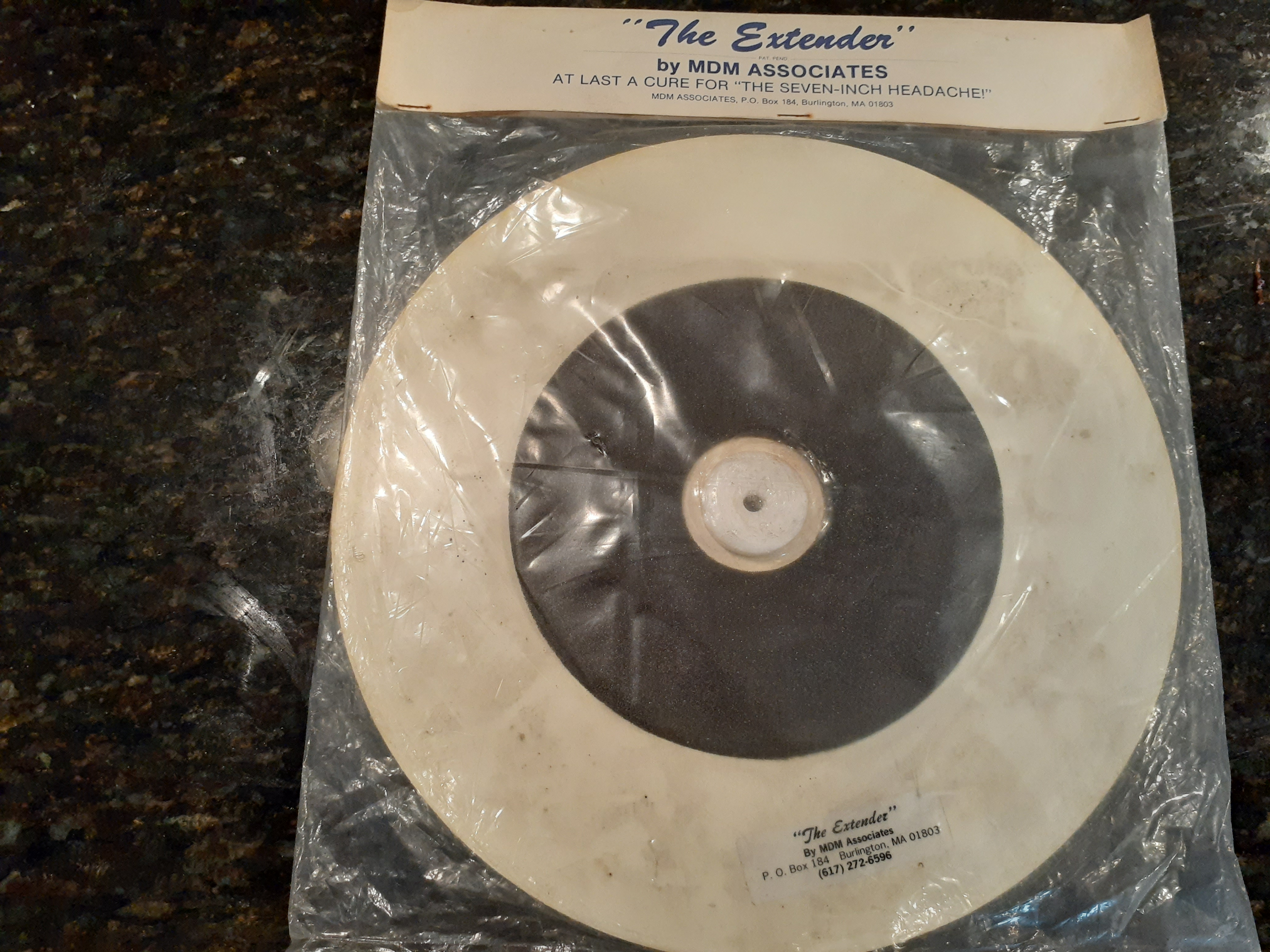
"The Extender" in its original packaging
