= Wire recording =

Early magnetic recording technology

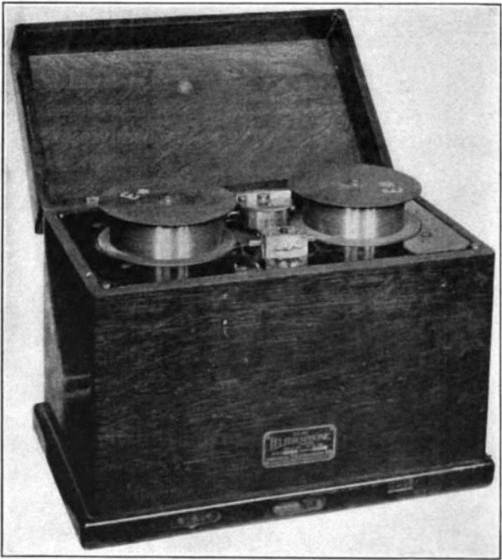
Poulsen Telegraphone recorder from 1922

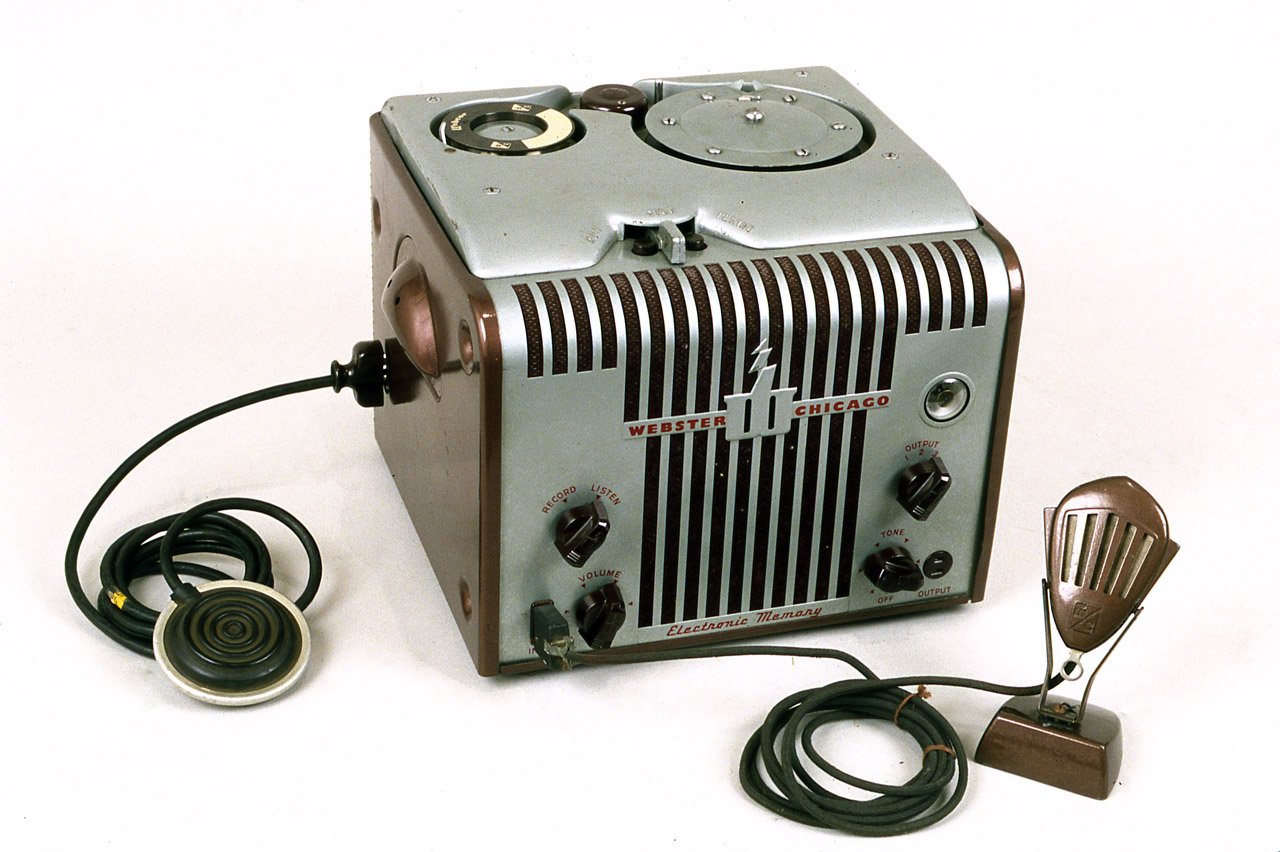
A Webster-Chicago Model 7 wire recorder from 1948

Wire recording, also known as magnetic wire recording, was the first magnetic recording technology, an analog type of audio storage. It recorded sound signals on a thin steel wire using varying levels of magnetization. The first crude magnetic recorder was invented in 1898 by Valdemar Poulsen. The first magnetic recorder to be made commercially available anywhere was the Telegraphone, manufactured by the American Telegraphone Company, Springfield, Massachusetts in 1903.

The wire is pulled rapidly across a recording head which magnetizes each point along the wire in accordance with the intensity and polarity of the electrical audio signal being supplied to the recording head at that instant. By later drawing the wire across the same or a similar head while the head is not being supplied with an electrical signal, the varying magnetic field presented by the passing wire induces a similarly varying electric current in the head, recreating the original signal at a reduced level.

Magnetic wire recording was replaced by magnetic tape recording by the 1950s, but devices employing one or the other of these media had been more or less simultaneously under development for many years before either came into widespread use. The principles and electronics involved are nearly identical.

== History ==
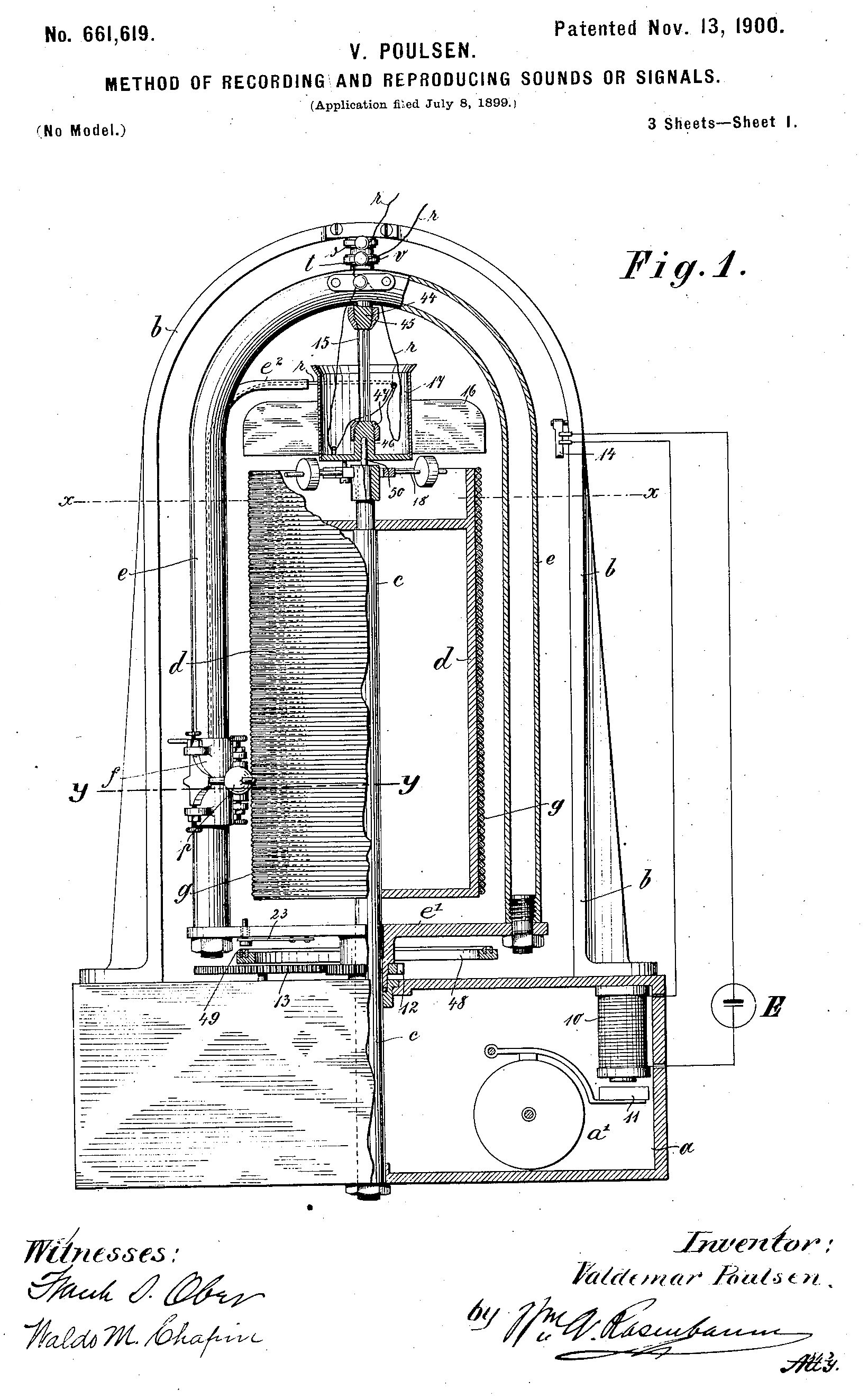
First US patent issued 1900 for a magnetic wire recorder by inventor Valdemar Poulsen

The wire recorder was invented in 1898 by Danish engineer Valdemar Poulsen, who gave his product the trade name Telegraphone. Wire recorders for dictation and telephone recording were made almost continuously by multiple companies (mainly the American Telegraphone Company) through the 1920s and 1930s, but use of this new technology was extremely limited. Dictaphone and Ediphone recorders, which still employed wax cylinders as the recording medium, were the devices normally used for these applications during this period.

The peak of wire recording lasted from approximately 1946 to 1954. It resulted from technical improvements and the development of inexpensive designs licensed internationally by the Brush Development Company of Cleveland, Ohio and the Armour Research Foundation of the Armour Institute of Technology (later the IIT Research Institute of the Illinois Institute of Technology). The two organizations (Brush and Armour) licensed dozens of manufacturers in the U.S., Japan, and Europe. Examples are Wilcox-Gay, Peirce, Webcor, and Air King. Sales elsewhere encouraged Sears to provide a model, and some authors to prepare specialized manuals. Pyrox made a version in Australia as early as 1947.

These improved wire recorders were not only marketed for office use, but also as home entertainment devices that offered advantages over the home acetate disc recorders which were increasingly sold for making short recordings of family and friends and for recording excerpts from radio broadcasts. Unlike home-cut phonograph records, the steel wire could be reused for new recordings and allowed much longer uninterrupted recordings to be made than the few minutes of audio per side possible with disc recorders.

The earliest magnetic tape recorders, not commercially available in the United States until 1948, were too expensive, complicated, and bulky to compete with these consumer-level wire recorders. During the first half of the 1950s, however, tape recorders which were sufficiently affordable, simple, and compact to be suitable for home and office use started appearing and they rapidly superseded wire recorders in the marketplace.

Exceptionally, the use of wire for sound recording continued into the 1960s in Protona's Minifon miniature recorders, in which the importance of maximizing recording time in a minimum of space outweighed other considerations. For any given level of audio quality, the nearly hair-thin wire had the advantage that it was a much more compact storage medium than tape. The Minifon wire recorder was designed for stealth use and its accessories included a microphone disguised as a wristwatch.

Wire recording was also used in some aircraft flight recorders beginning in the early 1940s, mainly for recording radio conversations between crewmen or with ground stations. Because steel wire was more compact, robust, and heat-resistant than magnetic tape (which is plastic-based), wire recorders continued to be manufactured for this purpose through the 1950s and remained in use somewhat later than that. There were also wire recorders made to record data in satellites and other uncrewed spacecraft of the 1950s to perhaps the 1970s.

== Characteristics ==
=== Magnetic format ===
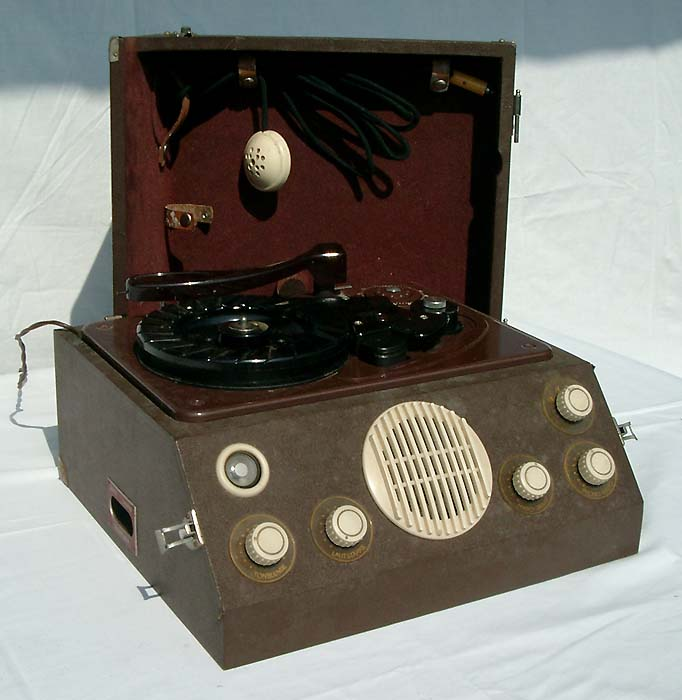
German Reichhalter Reporter W102 wire recorder (c. 1950)

Poulsen's original Telegraphone and other very early recorders placed the two poles of the record/replay head on opposite sides of the wire. The wire is thus magnetized transversely to the direction of travel. This method of magnetization was quickly found to have the limitation that as the wire twisted during playback, there were times when the magnetization of the wire was at right angles to the position of the two poles of the head and the output from the head fell to almost zero.

The recorder was improved by placing the two poles on the same side of the wire so that the wire was magnetized along its length or longitudinally. Additionally, the poles were shaped into a V so that the head wrapped around the wire to some extent. This increased the magnetizing effect and also increased the sensitivity of the head on replay because it collected more of the magnetic flux from the wire. This system was not entirely immune to twisting but the effects were far less marked.

=== Media capacity and speed ===
Compared to tape recorders, wire recording devices have a high media speed, made necessary because of the use of the solid metal medium. Standard postwar wire recorders use a nominal speed of 24 inches per second (610 mm/s), making a typical one-hour spool of wire 7,200 feet (approx. 2200 m) long. This enormous length is possible on a spool less than 3 inches (76 mm) in diameter because the wire was very fine, having a diameter of .004 to .006 in (0.10 to 0.15 mm) for later models, an improvement over Poulsen's Telegraphone of 1898 which used .01-inch (0.25 mm) wire. Smaller 30- and 15-minute lengths of wire were employed by the majority of recorders made after 1945. Some heavy-duty recorders use the larger Armour spools, which can contain enough wire to record continuously for several hours. Because the wire is pulled past the head by the take-up spool, the actual wire speed slowly increases as the effective diameter of the take-up spool increases. Standardization prevented this peculiarity from having any impact on the playback of a spool recorded on a different machine, but audible consequences can result from substantially altering the original length of a recorded wire by excisions or by dividing it up onto multiple spools.

=== Fidelity ===
The audio fidelity of a wire recording made on one of these post-1945 machines is comparable to a contemporary phonograph record or one of the early tape recorders, given a microphone or other signal source of equal quality. Because of its homogeneous nature and very high speed, wire is relatively free of the noticeable background hiss that characterized tape recordings before the advent of noise reduction systems. The Magnecord Corp. of Chicago briefly manufactured a high-fidelity wire recorder intended for studio use, but soon abandoned the system to concentrate on tape recorders.

== Handling and editing ==
To facilitate handling as the user threaded the wire across the recording head and affixed it to the take-up spool, some manufacturers attached a strip of plastic to each end of the wire. This was designed to press-fit snugly into either spool. To prevent the wire from piling up unevenly on the spool as it was recorded, played or rewound, on the majority of machines the head assembly slowly oscillates up and down or back and forth to distribute the wire evenly. On some machines, moving wire guides perform this function. These are similar to mechanisms that distribute line across a fishing reel. After recording or playback, the wire has to be rewound before any further use can be made of the machine. Unlike reel-to-reel tape recorders, the take-up reel on most wire recorders is not removable.

A break in the wire is repaired by tying the ends together and trimming. When such a repair is made to an existing recording, a jump in the sound results during playback, but because of the high speed of the wire the loss of an inch due to tying and trimming is trivial and might pass unnoticed. Unfortunately, if the wire breaks it can easily become tangled, and snarls are extremely difficult to fix. Sometimes the only practical solution is to carefully cut the tangled portion away from the spool—an operation which runs the risk of endlessly enlarging the problem—and discard it. The difficulty of handling the wire itself when necessary is arguably the only serious shortcoming, among several definite advantages, of steel wire as a monophonic recording medium.

Editing is accomplished by cutting and splicing. As the knot of each splice passes through the head during playback, a very brief loss of normal contact is inevitable and the resulting dropouts can make editing musical recordings problematic. Although wire is not as suitable for editing as magnetic tape (a plastic-based material) would prove to be, in the field of radio broadcasting it offered tremendous advantages over trying to edit material recorded on transcription discs, which was usually accomplished by dubbing to a new transcription disc with the aid of multiple turntables and stopwatches. The first regularly scheduled network radio program produced and edited on wire was CBS' Hear It Now with Edward R. Murrow.

== Notable uses ==
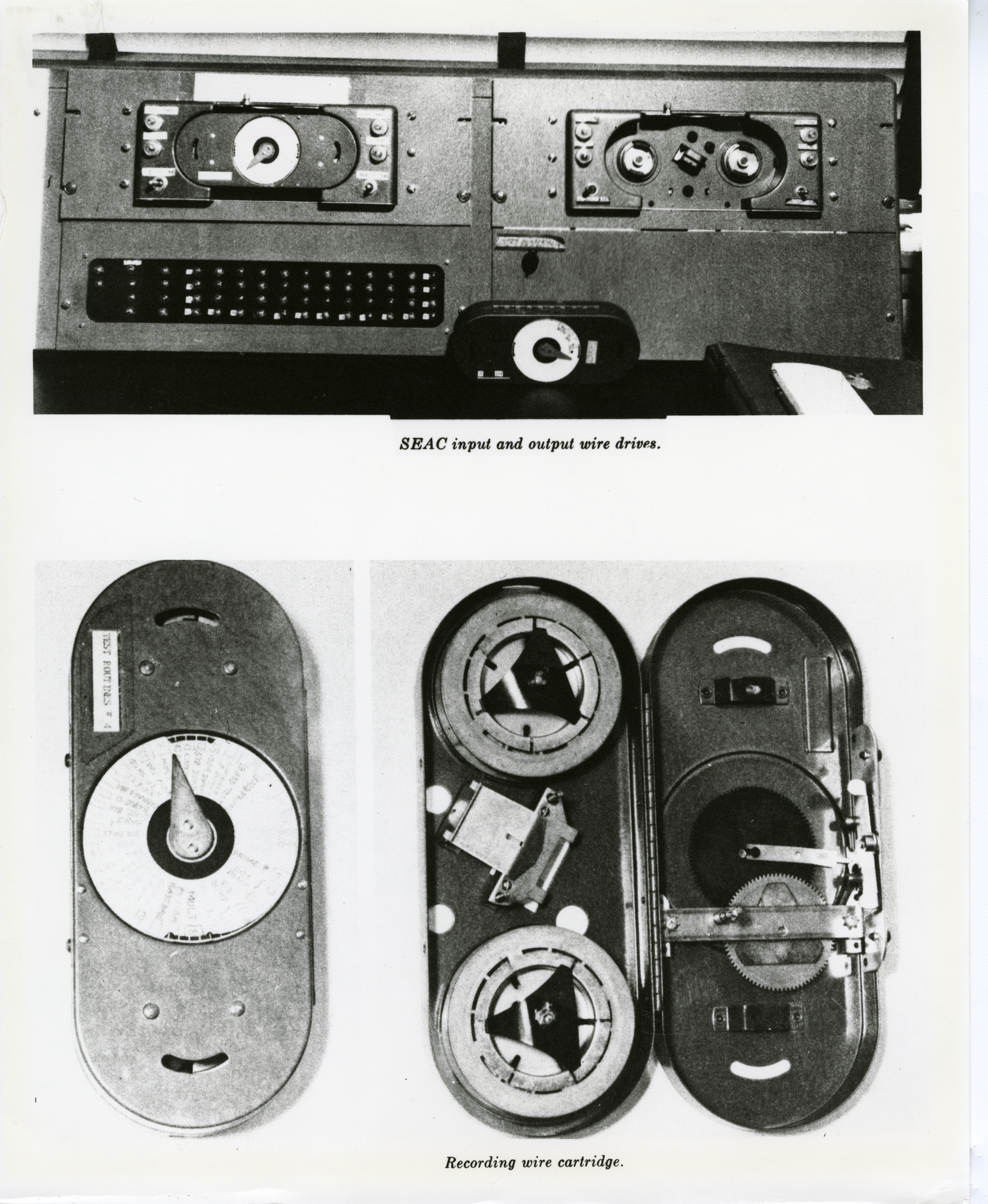
SEAC magnetic wire drives and cartridges

In 1944–1945, the 3132 Signal Service Company Special of the U.S. Army's top secret Ghost Army used wire recorders to create sonic deception on the Western Front in the Second World War. Multiple battlefield scenarios were recreated using military sounds recorded at Fort Knox, Kentucky. The wire-recorded audio, which was played back through powerful amplifiers and speakers mounted on vehicles, was used to conceal real Allied deployments, locations and operations.

In 1944 at the Middle East Radio Station of Cairo, Egyptian composer Halim El-Dabh used wire recorders as a tool to compose music.

In 1946, David Boder, a professor of psychology at Illinois Institute of Technology in Chicago, traveled to Europe to record long interviews with "displaced persons"—most of them Holocaust survivors. Using an early wire recorder from the Armour Research Foundation, Boder came back with the first recorded Holocaust testimonials and in all likelihood the first recorded oral histories of significant length.

In 1946, Norman Corwin and his technical assistant, Lee Bland, took a wire recorder on their One World Flight, a round-the-world trip subsidized by friends of Wendell Willkie and patterned after Willkie's own 1942 trip. Corwin documented the post-war world and used his recordings in a series of 13 broadcast documentaries on CBS—which were also among the first broadcast uses of recorded sound allowed by the radio networks.

In 1947, Maya Deren, an American experimental filmmaker, purchased a wire recorder from her Guggenheim Fellowship funds to record Haitian Vodou ceremonies for her documentary: Meditation on Violence.

In 1949 at Fuld Hall in Rutgers University, Paul Braverman made a 75-minute recording of a Woody Guthrie concert using a wire recorder. The recording only came to light in 2001, and appears to be the only surviving live recording of Woody Guthrie; it was restored over several years and released on CD in 2007. The CD, The Live Wire: Woody Guthrie in Performance 1949, subsequently won the 2008 Grammy Award for Best Historical Album.

One of the world's first stored-program computers, SEAC, built in 1950 at the U.S. National Bureau of Standards, used wire recorders to store digital data.

In 1952, the Harvard University physics department's musical variety show The Physical Revue, written by Tom Lehrer and performed by a cast including Lehrer, Lewis M. Branscomb and others, was recorded on wire by a later winner of the Nobel Prize, Norman Foster Ramsey Jr. This recording was recently rediscovered and made available online.

=== Fictional uses ===
Wire recorders sometimes appear in motion pictures made during the time of their widest use. For example, in office scenes in the original 1951 version of The Thing, a typical Webster-Chicago unit is plainly visible on a small table by the window. In some shots (e.g., at 0:11:40 on the 2003 DVD release), its detached lid, carrying two extra spools of wire, is also visible. In this instance the recorder is simply set dressing and is not shown in operation. Ann Robinson's character in the 1954 Dragnet feature film carried and used a Protona Minifon wire recorder to gather evidence in a pivotal scene. The 1958 spy thriller Spy in the Sky! uses a wire recording as a plot device. In the episode "The Relaxed Informer" (S1E24) of Danger Man the spy courier is smuggling a recording made on wire secreted inside the handle holding a puppet's strings. The recording wire is later shown being played in an office using a wire player. In episode 2.18 of Adventures of Superman, "Semi-Private Eye", PI Homer Garrity has a wire recorder he uses to surreptitiously record his clients.

The fictional Allied officers of Hogan's Heroes used a wire recorder to record a meeting in Kommandant Klink's office on a device that was disguised as a sewing box made of wooden thread spools. In 1965, "The Case of the Tell-Tale Tap" episode of Perry Mason, the judge upheld Mason's objection to the introduction of a wire recording when his client was tried for murder. A wire recording was the subject of a 1966 Mission: Impossible episode titled "A Spool There Was". The Department S episode "A Cellar Full of Silence" revolves around a blackmail recording on a wire disguised as part of another object. A wire recorder is also used as a plot device in Arthur Miller's 1949 play, Death of a Salesman. In the 1990 film The Two Jakes, set in 1948, the plot centers around a wire recording made in a divorce-case-turned-homicide.

== See also ==
- Oberlin Smith
- Pyrox Wire Recorder
- Webster-Chicago
