= Churches of Christ in Australia =

Christian movement in Australia

- Classification: Christianity
- Orientation: Restorationist
- Scripture: New Testament
- Structure: Federation of state-based autonomous conferences
- Associations: Disciples Ecumenical Consultative Council; World Communion of Reformed Churches; National Council of Churches in Australia; World Convention of Churches of Christ
- Region: Australia
- Congregations: 300
- Missionary organization: Global Mission Partners
- Seminaries: Stirling Theological College; Australian College of Ministries
- Publications: The Australian Christian (ceased in 2008)
- Official website: cofcaustralia.org.au

The Churches of Christ in Australia is an Australian Christian Restorationist denomination that is a member of the World Convention of Churches of Christ.

Key features of the church's culture, values and practices claim a concern for Christian unity, a commitment to evangelism, an emphasis on the New Testament, a confession of faith, believer's baptism, the weekly celebration of the Lord's Supper presided over by a lay person, local church autonomy with collaborative leadership, and a liberal approach that promotes diversity and individual freedom. The church conferences are active in the provision of community services.

Organised as a federation of five autonomous regionally-based conferences, there is no national organisational leader.

== Beliefs ==
Key features are the weekly celebration of the Lord's Supper presided over by a lay person and a commitment to believer's baptism.

The church is active in community services and the ecumenical movement.

== Structure ==
The Churches of Christ in Australia are made up of five state conferences that are an association of independent churches. Each state conference appoints two individuals who form the Council of Churches of Christ in Australia (CCCA). Within this conference structure, individual churches are largely autonomous and operate on a congregational and democratic form of government. Leadership varies in local churches and where there are ministers or pastors they may or may not be formally ordained. Lay people usually play an important part in the worship, mission, governance and management of the church.

The CCCA facilitates representation on national and international bodies; administers ordination; fosters communication and collaboration between the state conferences; communicates with the media on issues of national significance, and make submissions to the Australian Government and other national bodies; and operates as a reporting body on national or international matters.

The five state conferences are organised as: New South Wales and the Australian Capital Territory, Queensland, South Australia and the Northern Territory, Victoria and Tasmania, and Western Australia.

The Church is affiliated with the World Convention of Churches of Christ, the Disciples Ecumenical Consultative Council, the World Communion of Reformed Churches, and the National Council of Churches in Australia. National cooperative ministries include Global Mission Partners (formerly the Australian Churches of Christ Overseas Mission Board), Stirling Theological College, Indigenous Ministries Australia, the Defence Force Chaplains Committee, and Youth Vision Australia.

== Statistics ==
The Churches of Christ in Australia is one of the smaller Christian groups by affiliation. The 2001 census showed 61,335 identifying, falling to 49,687 in the 2011 census, which represented 0.2% of the population. This is compared with 61.1% of Australians who indicated religious affiliation with any Christian denomination.

The National Church Life Survey 2001 showed that Churches of Christ had the highest attendance-to-affiliation percentage. This survey showed a regular estimated attendance of 45,100 (74%). Average weekly attendance figures in 2013 were 38,500, although a larger number of people would be expected to have a connection to a Church of Christ.

== History ==
As part of the Restoration Movement with historical influences from the United States and Britain, the Church was influenced by the British culture that dominated in colonial Australia in the nineteenth century. Congregations in the colonies of New South Wales, South Australia, and Victoria, were established at the initiative of individuals who travelled to these colonies to pursue employment opportunities. Elsewhere in Australia Churches of Christ congregations were established as missionary initiatives: in colonial Van Diemen's Land (now Tasmania) in the 1870s, colonial Queensland in 1882, and colonial Western Australia in 1891.

In the beginning Churches of Christ in Australia relied heavily on lay ministers, known as 'Disciples' until the 1860s, who tended to preach in a dry and reasoning manner, maintained congregational autonomy under the governance of elders, strictly observed what they believed were New Testament patterns (especially weekly Lord's Supper and baptism by immersion), and took a "common sense" approach to reading the Bible.

However, practices of ministry, structures of governance, worship, and theology have all changed over time and this has raised issues of identity for the Churches of Christ in Australia. The Churches of Christ in Australia are more similar to the Christian Church in the United States (most Churches of Christ in the United States sing a capella, whereas most Churches of Christ in Australia use musical instruments, as does the Christian Church in the United States).

=== Queensland ===
A small group met in Albion, Brisbane in 1871, however it was not until 1 August 1882 that C.M. Fischer and T Geraghty established the first Church of Christ in Queensland at the Zillman Waterholes (now Zillmere, Queensland). The Ann Street Church of Christ was established in 1883 and moved into its present building in Brisbane's central business district in 1898.

=== Victoria and Tasmania ===
Churches of Christ in Victoria began with the arrival of the Ingram and Picton families from England who established regular meetings in Prahran and officially constituted a congregation in 1855. By 1861 there were 12 congregations with a total of 230 members. Seeking to increase the membership, the congregations combined to support their first full-time evangelist, Isaac Mermelstein, a converted Jew from Kiev. He travelled to Chiltern on the north-east Victorian goldfields in 1861, where he officiated at a number of baptisms. However, Mermelstein faded from view in the history of Churches of Christ as he disagreed with the leadership over the nature of baptism. Baptism by immersion on confession of faith was considered essential for salvation, but Mermelstein appears to have also been convinced of the validity of Holy Spirit baptism – something which the then deeply rationalist Churches of Christ could not abide. The church experienced some growth with the evangelism of T.H. Milner, visiting from Scotland in 1862, and then significant growth with the preaching of Henry S. Earl, who arrived from the US in 1864 as the first of a number of American preachers who influenced Churches of Christ in Victoria. Despite the presence of some American preachers, the denomination understood itself to be essentially British and this was reflected in its correspondence with British journals such as the British Millennial Harbinger.

In the 1880s Antoinette Thurgood established a ministry for and by women in Victoria. Initially called the Sisters' Conference, it was later known as Christian Women's Fellowship. The first woman to be appointed to pastoral ministry (Hawthorne Church of Christ, Qld.) was Violet Callanan in 1931 who had recently completed a certificate in mission studies at the College of the Bible in Glen Iris, Melbourne. Ordination for women was introduced in the 1940s, and the first woman to be ordained was Alice Barton Saunders in 1946. However, the first women to be ordained and also to minister in Churches of Christ in Victoria (and Australia) were Pam Bowers and Robyn Haskell in 1973.

=== South Australia and the Northern Territory ===
In March 1839, Robert Lawrie and his fiancée Margaret Mailey; Archibald Greenshields, and Marion Greenshields (née Lawrie) and their daughter Jane aged 2; Thomas Neill and family; all of Kilmarnock and nearby Newmilns, applied on the same day with the same agent for free passage to South Australia, departing London 21 May 1839 on the ship Recovery and arriving in September 1839. In 1836, John Lawrie, older brother to the above-mentioned Lawries, had joined the Kilmarnock Scotch Baptist church, believing it to be the "true" church. But by 1837 John had become so influenced by the writings of Alexander Campbell that he commenced Disciples meetings at Newmilns. All the above had been influenced by the Restoration movement; the Lawries (including James) and the Greenshields accepting its Biblical teaching. The coming to South Australia was due to Andrew Warnock of Paisley. Warnock was a manufacturer, but like other businessmen in Glasgow he was keen to invest in the new free colony of South Australia. Property was purchased for his son John Warnock, but as he knew nothing about farming, James Lawrie and William Wilson were employed to establish it. They left aboard the ship Ariadne in April 1839. The journey was long and hazardous: there were 223 passengers crowded onto the ship, and apart from all the dangers of illness, of storms, of rounding the Cape of Good Hope, a fire broke out on ship. Finally, in August 1839 their party, which included more persons than those listed above, arrived and were given or attained positions in the colony.

Thomas Neill had been in business as a grocer in Kilmarnock and before that he had been a farm servant. It was intended that he should work on the Warnock property but on arrival it was discovered that the dry climate required many more acres to support a family than it did in Scotland. Fortunately for him he was immediately given a job as storekeeper with the South Australian Company by the manager, his old friend David McLaren. Neill had relations in Glasgow, Paisley, and Kilmarnock. The Neills attended the Scotch Baptist church, built in Hindley Street by the Methodists then abandoned for their new building in Gawler Place. McLaren was the unofficial pastor, and later, Thomas, his wife Jean, and Agnes their daughter were listed as members in 1844 when the Scotch Baptists were meeting in Morphett Street.

Upon arrival, James Lawrie went immediately south to Mertin Farm at Noarlunga; land that adjoins the Onkaparinga River. He was later joined by his brother Robert. William Wilson looked after another section of Mertin Farm. Another Scotch Baptist family from Glasgow arrived aboard Glenswilly in September 1839, the day before the Recovery. This was the Wauchope family, John, his wife and two sons, George and William. They settled on the property named Allandale in the Morphett Vale area. William worked for James and Robert on Mertin Farm. The major part of Mertin Farm lay not far below the Craig and Murray properties on the Onkaparinga River. In 1841 when David McLaren returned to England, the Adelaide congregation split over the question of "open communion." A new group was formed at North Adelaide with Samuel Gill as minister. Alexander Murray with seven others were dismissed to form a church at Noarlunga.

It is probable that the Noarlunga group consisted of Alexander and Jane Murray; James and Janet Craig; Archibald and Marion Greenshields; Robert and Margaret Lawrie; James Lawrie and William Wilson. Most of the above were connected through family relationship. This group could very well have been the source of some of Campbell's writings referred to as being in the Adelaide Scotch Baptist congregation and perhaps originally coming from John Lawrie. In March 1841 John Warnock arrived aboard John Cooper from Greenock, to take over Mertin Farm. The Lawrie brothers worked for Warnock for a time while he settled into the management of the farm, then moved out. James Craig and Alexander Murray, Scotch Baptists from Glasgow, arrived with their families in the ship India, in February 1840. They moved on to properties south of Adelaide. In October 1840 Craig bought a second section not far from his home property and made arrangements for Archibald Greenshields to manage it.

In mid-1842 James Craig, caught in the financial crisis, was forced to sell the property that was managed by Greenshields. Greenshields became a labourer. Alexander Murray was able to survive for a time by accepting Robert Lawrie into joint occupancy of his property.

Although the financial crisis of the colony had changed the fortunes of this little group, they managed, for a time, to remain in close proximity with each other. It is likely that the little southern congregation existed up until 1845 when Murray left for England and the Lawries shifted to Lonyunga in the Myponga Hills. It wasn't long after this that John Lawrie became concerned about the brethren "scattered over the wild prairie." It was then that Lawrie persuaded his fellow elder, John Aird, to come to S.A. to take charge of the "little flock" in the south. John Aird and John Watson arrived in S.A. with their families on the ship Lady McNaughton/Lady MacNaghten, in October 1847. They met with the brethren at Franklin Street and then travelled to Noarlunga where Aird called his fellow restorationists together. They celebrated the Lord's Supper on October 31 and formed into a church on 7 November 1847.

Thomas Magarey arrived in South Australia via New Zealand in 1845. He moved to Noarlunga after he was married to Elizabeth Verco on 10 March 1848. He worked in the local flour mill at the Horseshoe and for the 18 months to two years they were at Noarlunga, worshipped with the little group of disciples led by John Aird. Others in the congregation were: Watsons, Browns, Greenshields, Robert Lawries and Scotts. At the beginning of 1850, two years later, the Magareys returned to Hindmarsh, where Magarey wrote glowingly of the time spent with John Aird and the church at McLaren Vale.

Alexander Lawrie came to live in the Myponga Hills in 1851. In 1855 he married Jane Watson, daughter of John Watson. John Lawrie arrived in the Myponga Hills November 1853. His wife and family joined him in November 1855.

The church in the south had close links with the disciples in Adelaide. James Craig and John Brown represented the McLaren Vale church at the opening of the Hindmarsh church, 10 June 1855. Subscribers from the McLaren Vale church to the Grote Street building fund were: Aird, Brown, Craig, Jones, Greenshields, John Lawrie, Robert Lawrie, Watson, Scott. The Grote Street church building of the Christian Disciples was opened in December 1856. As a number of families lived in the Myponga Hills John Lawrie decided mid 1856 they should meet locally as the Willunga congregation.

Members of the Willunga church appointed as Trustees of the Grote Street church on 27 June 1856:- John Lawrie and James Craig. John pointed out difficulties of country members acting as Trustees and so at a meeting on August 30, 1856, the previous country appointments were cancelled and Adelaide members appointed in place of those from Willunga and Milang. Late in 1857, John, Robert, Alexander Lawrie and families, sold their properties and moved north to farm the land at Alma Plains. Archibald Greenshields followed 3 or 4 years later and the Aird family later still. A chapel was built at Alma Plains in 1862 which doubled as a school room. The chapel soon became too small and a new Christian Disciples chapel was built 10 years later. T. J. Gore of Norwood and John Lawrie of Alma conducted the opening services to a large congregation. The following Monday some three or four hundred gathered for tea, after which John Lawrie presided over a meeting at which some five hundred heard addresses by Kidner, Colbourne, Woolcock, and Gore.

== Theological education ==
Theological education and formation occurs at the:

- Stirling Theological College, located in Mulgrave in south-east Melbourne, is the movement's national theological college. Stirling was formerly known as the Churches of Christ Theological College and before that the College of the Bible. It has students completing coursework and research from across Australia.
- Australian College of Ministries is owned by New South Wales Churches of Christ Conference, and provides training across Australia. Its courses are taught as part of the Sydney College of Divinity.

Ordination, which is bestowed by the conferences, is open to both men and women.

== Publications ==
Toward the end of the nineteenth century the denomination established a periodical, The Australian Christian, based in Victoria, which carried the news and opinion of the churches and their members for the next century. This periodical was closed in 2008.

== See also ==
- Pyrox Wire Recorder
