= Telestrator =

Device for adding a sketch to a moving video

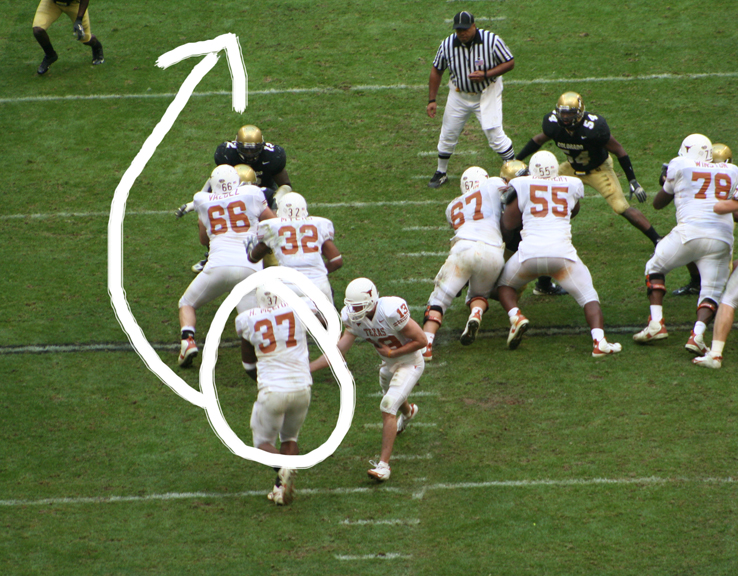
In sports, the telestrator is typically used in conjunction with instant replay to diagram and analyze a recent play.

A telestrator is a device that allows its operator to draw a freehand sketch over a moving or still video image. Also known as a video marker, this device is often used in sports and weather broadcasts to diagram and analyze sports plays or incoming weather patterns. The user typically draws with a finger, stylus or pen on a touchscreen or graphics tablet. From the touchscreen or the tablet, the drawing signal is communicated to the telestrator, which overlays the video image with the drawing and outputs the combined signal for broadcast or display.

Today, the telestrator is used in a wide variety of applications (from educational, boardroom, church and military presentations to telemedicine conferences), where it can be used by both the near and far ends to annotate precise details of microscopic images or other medical images that are under consultation. The telestrator is also used in courtrooms to communicate details of multimedia images presented to a jury.

== History ==
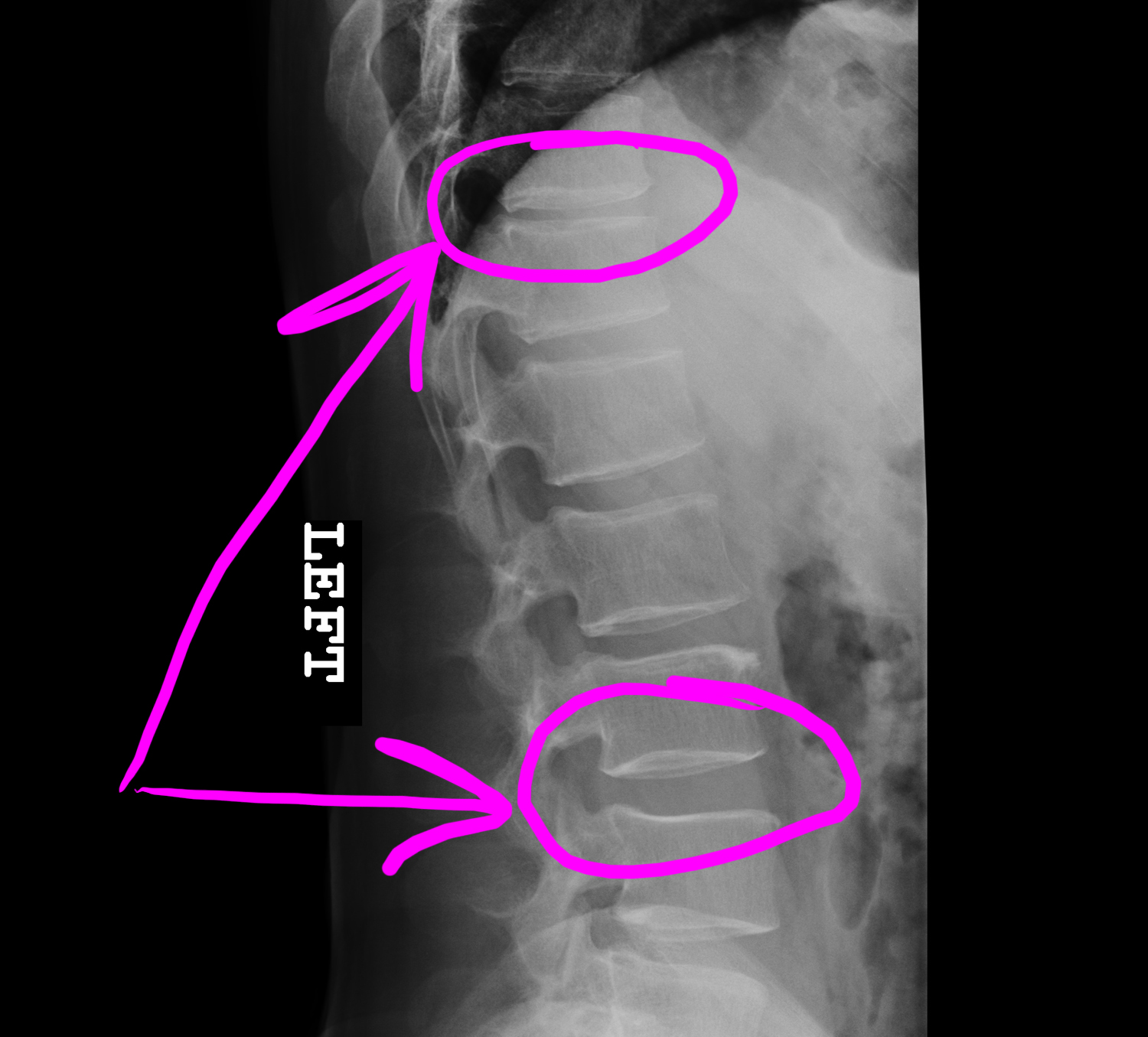
Example of how a telestrator might annotate a medical image shared during a telemedicine session

The telestrator was invented by physicist Leonard Reiffel, who used it to draw illustrations on a series of science shows he did for public television's WTTW in Chicago in the late 1950s.

The original Telestrator consisted of a storage tube oscilloscope with a television camera aimed at it. A storage tube is a special cathode-ray tube (CRT) that retains its image until deliberately erased. A second device was used to decode X and Y positions of a pen-like device held on a metal plate. These produced varying voltages that moved a corresponding dot around the face of the oscilloscope. Normally this was at low voltage, too low to "write" the image onto the CRT. When a button was pressed, the voltage was increased and the image began to be stored. The image was picked up by the television camera and mixed with main display, using a beam splitter or video mixer. A variety of methods were presented that allowed the pickup to be placed directly over a display of the main signal.

After he had been using it to help illustrate details to his young science audience, he approached Chicago's CBS affiliate WBBM-TV suggesting it be used in sports and weather. Chicago Bears football player-turned-sportscaster Johnny Morris, who worked for Channel 2, began using it as did the station's chief meteorologist. According to Reiffel, "After that, New York began to hear about it, and it went on from there."

The user interface for early telestrators required the user to draw on a TV screen with a light pen, whereas modern implementations are commonly controlled with a touch screen or a graphics tablet.

The late NFL color commentator John Madden famously used a telestrator during football games for many years, boosting the device's popularity. Because the telestrator was used for NFL game coverage as well as in former NFL player O. J. Simpson's murder trial, this fact was exploited to humorous effect on a 1995 episode of Saturday Night Live, with Simpson inadvertently writing out "I did it" by using a telestrator as he explained a passage of play.

During his time as a color commentator for NBC and TNT of the NBA, Mike Fratello has been referred to as the "Czar of the Telestrator" by Marv Albert for his masterful way of diagramming basketball plays on screen.

Howie Meeker, NHL hockey color commentator and studio analyst, used the telestrator for many years on CBC's Hockey Night in Canada to analyze plays during intermissions. He was famous for shouting instructions to the "boys in the truck" – such as "Back it up! Back it up!" and "Stop it right there!" – in his trademark squeaky voice.

Wrestling announcer Bobby Heenan briefly used a telestrator while in the then-World Wrestling Federation, calling it the "Brain Scan". He would usually use it during post-match replays to doodle derogatory pictures or comments.

Reiffel won the 2004 National Academy of Television Arts and Sciences Emmy for his invention. He is one of two individuals to receive the award, which is usually given to companies and groups.

Today, telestrators are widely used in broadcasts of all major sports. They have also become a useful tool in televised weather reports. They are also used by Ian Waite on Britain's Strictly Come Dancing: It Takes Two and humorously on the U.S. reality game show Wipeout, mostly by John Henson.

== See also ==
- Computer-mediated reality
- Overhead projector
