= Project A119 =

American plan to detonate a nuclear bomb on the Moon

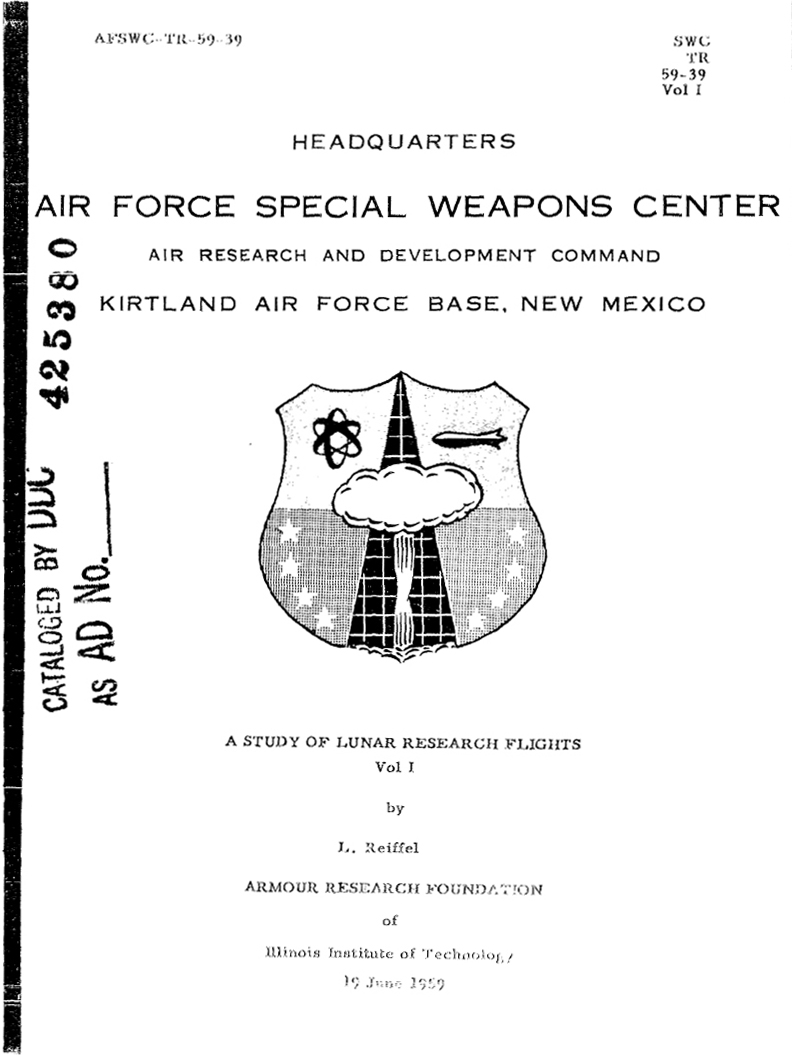
Cover of A Study of Lunar Research Flights – Volume I

Project A119, also known as A Study of Lunar Research Flights, was a top-secret plan developed in 1958 by the United States Air Force. The aim of the project was to detonate a nuclear bomb on the Moon, which would help in answering some of the mysteries in planetary astronomy and astrogeology. If the explosive device detonated on the surface, and not in a lunar crater, the flash of explosive light would have been faintly visible to people on Earth with their naked eye. This was meant as a show of force resulting in a possible boosting of domestic morale in the capabilities of the United States, a boost that was needed after the Soviet Union took an early lead in the Space Race.

The project was never carried out, being canceled after "Air Force officials decided its risks outweighed its benefits", and because a Moon landing would undoubtedly be a more popular achievement in the eyes of the American and international public alike. If executed, the plan might have led to a potential militarization of space. An identical project by the Soviet Union (Project E-4) also never came to fruition due to fears of the warhead falling back on Soviet territory, and the potential for an international incident.

The existence of the US project was revealed in 2000 by a former executive at the National Aeronautics and Space Administration (NASA), Leonard Reiffel, who had led the project in 1958. A young Carl Sagan was part of the team responsible for predicting the effects of a nuclear explosion in vacuum and low gravity, and evaluating the scientific value of the project. The relevant documents remained secret for nearly 45 years and, despite Reiffel's revelations, the United States government has never officially acknowledged its involvement in the study.

== Background ==
During the Cold War, the Soviet Union took the lead in the Space Race with the launch of Sputnik 1 on 4 October 1957. Sputnik was the first artificial satellite in orbit around the Earth, and the surprise of its successful launch, compounded by the resounding failure of Project Vanguard to launch an American satellite after two attempts, had been dubbed the "Sputnik crisis" by the media and was the impetus for the beginning of the Space Race. Trying to reclaim lost ground, the United States embarked on a series of new studies and projects, which eventually included the launch of Explorer 1, the creation of the Defense Advanced Research Projects Agency (DARPA), and NASA.

== Project ==
In 1949, the Armour Research Foundation (ARF), based at the Illinois Institute of Technology, began studying the effects of nuclear explosions on the environment. Those studies continued until 1962. In May 1958, ARF began covertly researching the potential consequences of a nuclear explosion on the Moon. The main objective of the program, running under the auspices of the United States Air Force which had initially proposed it, was to cause a nuclear explosion that would be visible from Earth. It was hoped that such a display would boost the morale of the American people.

At the time of the project's conception, newspapers were reporting a rumor that the Soviet Union was planning to detonate a hydrogen bomb on the Moon. According to press reports in late 1957, an anonymous source had divulged to a United States Secret Service agent that the Soviets planned to commemorate the anniversary of the October Revolution by causing a nuclear explosion on the Moon to coincide with a lunar eclipse on 7 November. News reports of the rumored launch included mention of targeting the dark side of the terminator—Project A119 would also consider this boundary as the target for an explosion. It was also reported that a failure to hit the Moon would likely result in the missile returning to Earth.

A similar idea had been put forward by Edward Teller, the "father of the H-bomb", who, in February 1957, proposed the detonation of nuclear devices both on and some distance from the lunar surface to analyze the effects of the explosion.

=== Research ===
The explosion was intended to occur along the Moon's terminator, for maximum visibility from Earth.

A ten-member team, led by Leonard Reiffel, was assembled at the Illinois Institute of Technology in Chicago to study the potential visibility of the explosion, the benefits to science, and the implications for the lunar surface. Among the members of the research team were astronomer Gerard Kuiper and his doctoral student Carl Sagan. Sagan was responsible for the mathematical projection of the expansion of a dust cloud in space around the Moon, an essential element in determining its visibility from Earth.

Scientists initially considered using a hydrogen bomb for the project, but the United States Air Force vetoed that idea due to the weight of such a device, because it would be too heavy to be propelled by the missile which would have been used. It was then decided to use a W25 warhead, a small, lightweight warhead with a relatively low 1.7 kiloton yield. By contrast, the Little Boy bomb dropped on the Japanese city of Hiroshima in 1945 had a yield of 13–18 kilotons. The W25 would be carried by a rocket toward the shadowed side of the Moon where it would detonate on impact. The dust cloud resulting from the explosion would be lit by the Sun and therefore visible from Earth. According to Reiffel, the Air Force's progress in the development of intercontinental ballistic missiles would have made such a launch feasible by 1959.

=== Cancellation ===
The project was canceled by the Air Force in January 1959, seemingly out of fear of the risk to the population if anything went wrong with the launch. Another factor, cited by project leader Leonard Reiffel, was the possible problem of nuclear fallout which would affect future lunar research projects and Moon colonization.

== Evidence of the Soviet project ==
Later reports in the 2010s showed that a corresponding Soviet project did indeed exist, although the only official documents on the project found so far began in 1958, not the 1957 date of the "anonymous" source whose rumors initiated the US project. The official Soviet plan also differs from the scenario reported in the press. Started in January 1958, it was part of a series of proposals under the codename "E". Project E-1 entailed plans to reach the Moon, while projects E-2 and E-3 involved sending a probe around the far side of the Moon to take a series of photographs of its surface. The final stage of the project, E-4, was to be a nuclear strike on the Moon, as a display of force. As with the American plan, the E series of projects was canceled while still in its planning stages, due to concerns regarding the safety and reliability of the launch vehicle.

== Consequences ==
The signing of the Partial Nuclear Test Ban Treaty in 1963 and the Outer Space Treaty in 1967 prevented future investigation of the concept of detonating a nuclear device on the Moon. By that time, both the United States and the Soviet Union had performed several high-altitude nuclear explosions, including the American Operation Hardtack I, Operation Argus, Operation Fishbowl, and the Soviet Project K.

By 1969, the United States had succeeded in being the first nation to land a man on the moon with the success of the Apollo 11 Moon mission. In December of that year, Apollo scientist Gary Latham suggested detonating a "smallish" nuclear device on the Moon in order to facilitate research into its geological make-up. The idea was dismissed because it would interfere with plans to measure the Moon's natural background radiation.

The existence of Project A119 remained largely secret until the mid-1990s, when writer Keay Davidson discovered the story while researching the life of Carl Sagan for a biography. Sagan's involvement with the project was apparent from his application for an academic scholarship at the Miller Institute of the University of California, Berkeley, in 1959. In the application, Sagan gave details of the project research, which Davidson felt constituted a violation of national security. The leak consisted of Sagan revealing the titles of two classified papers from the A119 project — the 1958 paper Possible Contribution of Lunar Nuclear Weapons Detonations to the Solution of Some Problems in Planetary Astronomy, and the 1959 paper Radiological Contamination of the Moon by Nuclear Weapons Detonations. A 1958 paper titled Cosmic Radiation and Lunar Radioactivity, credited to I. Filosofo, was also named by Sagan in a 1961 paper written for the United States National Research Council. These were among the eight reports created by the project, all of which were destroyed in 1987.

The resulting biography, Carl Sagan: A Life, was published in 1999. Shortly after, a review published in Nature highlighted the discovery of the leaked information. That led Reiffel to break his anonymity and write a letter to the journal confirming that Sagan's activity had at the time been considered a breach of the confidentiality of the project. Reiffel took the opportunity to reveal details of the studies, and his statements were widely reported in the media. Reiffel's revelation of the project was accompanied by his denunciation of the work carried out, with the scientist noting that he was "horrified that such a gesture to sway public opinion was ever considered".

As a result of the publicity the correspondence created, a freedom of information request was lodged concerning Project A119. It was only then that A Study of Lunar Research Flights – Volume I was made public, over 40 years after its inception. A search for the other volumes of documentation revealed that other reports were destroyed in the 1980s by the Illinois Institute of Technology.

David Lowry, a nuclear historian from the United Kingdom, has called the project's proposals "obscene", adding, "had they gone ahead, we would never have had the romantic image of Neil Armstrong taking 'one giant leap for mankind'".

== See also ==
- LCROSS—A NASA project which used a kinetic impact to study the presence of water on the Moon

== Footnotes ==
=== References ===
- Angelo, Joseph A (2007). Human Spaceflight (illustrated ed.). Infobase Publishing. ISBN 978-0-8160-5775-7.
- Davidson, Keay; Sagan, Carl (1999). Carl Sagan: A Life. Wiley. ISBN 978-0-471-25286-3.
- Hoddeson, Lillian; Henriksen, Paul W.; Meade, Roger A.; Westfall, Catherine L. (1993). Critical Assembly: A Technical History of Los Alamos During the Oppenheimer Years, 1943–1945. Cambridge University Press. ISBN 978-0-521-54117-6. OCLC 26764320.
- Ulivi, Paolo; Harland, David Michael (2004). Lunar Exploration: Human Pioneers and Robotic Surveyors. Springer. ISBN 978-1-85233-746-9.
