= Leonard Reiffel =

American physicist, author and educator

- Born: September 30, 1927; Chicago, Illinois, U.S.
- Died: April 15, 2017 (aged 89); Chicago, Illinois, U.S.
- Education: Illinois Institute of Technology
- Known for: Deputy director of Apollo program Led Project A119
- Awards: Peabody Award (1968)
- Scientific career
- Fields: Physics
- Workplaces: University of Chicago in Pisa; Illinois Institute of Technology; NASA

Leonard Reiffel (September 30, 1927 – April 15, 2017) was an American physicist, author and educator. Born in Chicago, Reiffel was an electrical engineering student for a number of years before entering into research fields. He collaborated with Enrico Fermi, Carl Sagan, and members of Operation Paperclip.

Reiffel also worked for NASA and the Illinois Institute of Technology, and won a Peabody Award for his work on the radio program The World Tomorrow. His experience with broadcasting led him to invent the telestrator as a visual aid for his programming; Reiffel held over fifty different patents for his inventions.

== Early life ==
Reiffel was born in Chicago on September 30, 1927. His father was Carl Reiffel, a silversmith credited with inventing a slide saxophone. His mother, the former Sophie Miller, was a district superintendent in the Chicago public school system. The younger Reiffel attended Theodore Roosevelt High School, before earning a bachelor's and master's degree as well as a doctorate in electrical engineering from the Illinois Institute of Technology between 1947 and 1953.

== Career ==
=== Universities and inventions ===
Reiffel began his career at the University of Chicago's Institute for Nuclear Studies, helping Enrico Fermi construct a 450-inch cyclotron. From there, Reiffel returned to the university at which he had studied, the Illinois Institute of Technology. Here, Reiffel was Group Vice President of the IIT Research Institute (formerly known as the Armour Research Foundation). During his tenure at the university, Reiffel created and patented over fifty different inventions, which earned him four separate R&D 100 Awards. Reiffel also collaborated with German scientists recruited in America as part of Operation Paperclip, working on an early prototype for a railgun.

=== NASA ===
Reiffel was involved in several positions in NASA's Apollo program, moving from being a consultant on the possibility of life on the Moon to become deputy director of the project, a post he held from 1965 to 1969. During this time, Reiffel was also put in charge of Project A119, a United States Air Force project intending to detonate a nuclear warhead on the Moon. Reiffel worked alongside Carl Sagan and Gerard Kuiper on the project. Reiffel also chaired the Interagency Manned Space Flight Experiments Board for several years, a body which worked alongside NASA, the United States Air Force, and the United States Department of Defense.

=== Broadcasting ===
Reiffel's work on radio and television has included Backyard Safari, Dimensions on Tomorrow's Living and The World Tomorrow. Backyard Safari was nominated for an Emmy Award, whilst Reiffel was honored with a Peabody Award in 1968 for his work on The World Tomorrow. Reiffel's time as a broadcaster led to him developing the telestrator, a device for drawing over still or moving video images; the device is now commonly employed by American football broadcasters while discussing plays. Reiffel first used the telestrator as part of Backyard Safari before convincing WBBM-TV weatherman John Coughlin to use it as part of his forecasts; it was from there that sports anchor Johnny Morris introduced its use to sports broadcasting.

=== Other work ===
Reiffel also worked as an artwork authenticator for the Hermitage Museum in Saint Petersburg, investigating the authenticity of work by Édouard Manet in 2002. In 1979, he published the science fiction novel The Contaminant. He also acted as a consultant to the governments of Belarus and Ukraine following the Chernobyl incident; this experience led him to write an unpublished second novel about nuclear terrorism.

== Death ==
Reiffel died of complications from pancreatic cancer in Chicago on April 15, 2017. He was survived by his second wife Nancy Reiffel, and sons Evan and David.

== Bibliography ==
=== Novels ===
- The contaminant. 1978.

=== Critical studies and reviews of Reiffel's work ===
The contaminant

- Kaufsek, Thomas (July–August 2020). "[Untitled review]". Curiosities. F&SF. 139 (1&2): 258. Archived from the original on July 18, 2020.

== Footnotes ==
=== References ===
- Kalte, Pamela M.; Nemeh, Katherine H. (2003). American Men & Women of Science: Q-S. Thomson/Gale. ISBN 0787665290.
- Ulivi, Paolo; Harland, David Michael (2004). Lunar Exploration: Human Pioneers and Robotic Surveyors. Springer. ISBN 1-85233-746-X.
