= Webster-Chicago =

Defunct Chicago-based audio equipment manufacturer

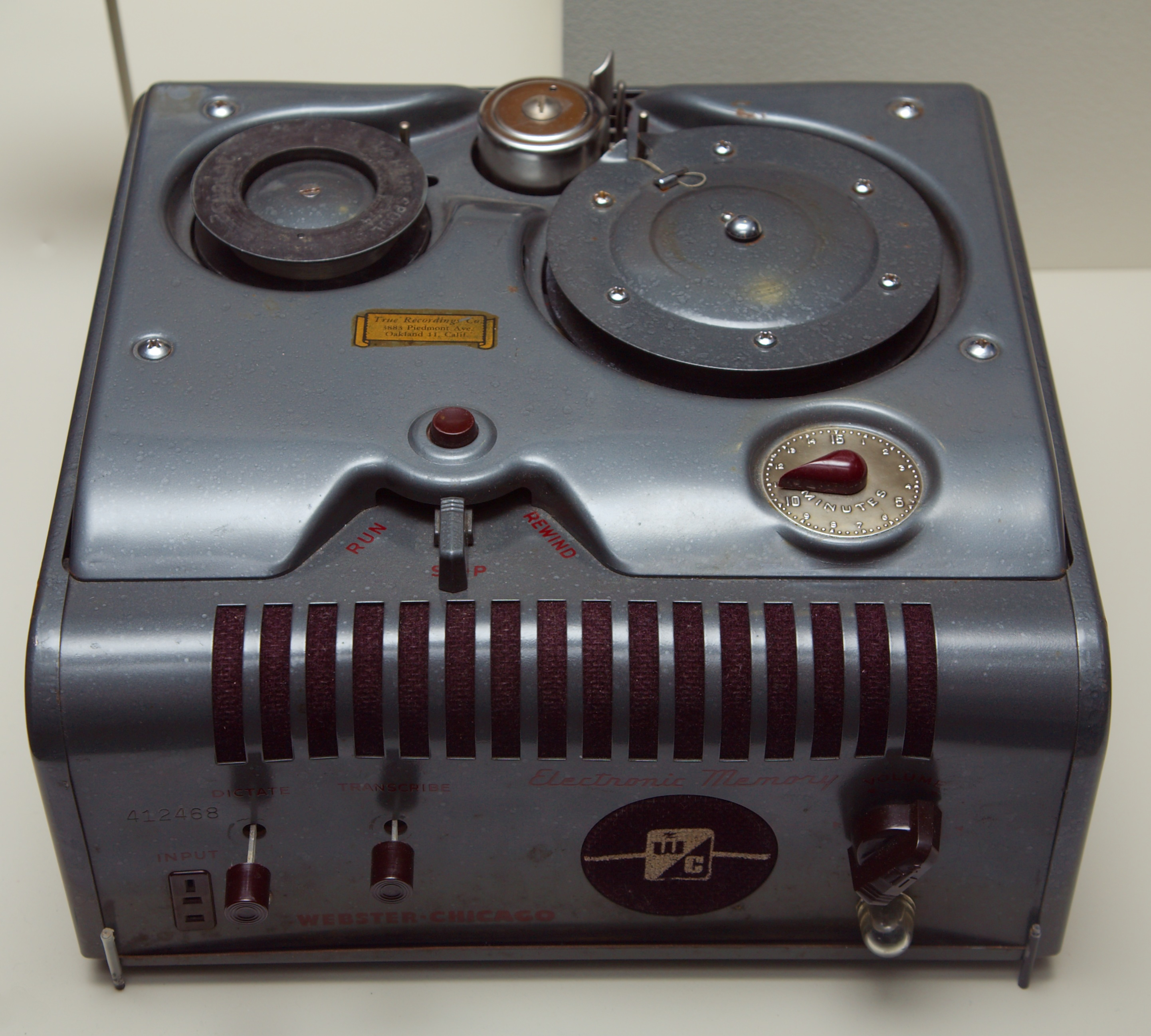
A Webster Chicago wire recorder from 1951

The Webster Chicago Corporation was a maker of electronic equipment in Chicago, Illinois. Many products were sold under the brand name Webcor. The product line included record changers, wire recorders and reel to reel tape recorders.

They also made phonograph amplifiers that are now used as guitar amplifiers in some cases. These amplifiers' sounds are similar to the sounds of the Fender Princeton. They are valued for their all-tube signal path and hand-wired circuit. Many Webster-Chicago record changers were installed in Magnavox home entertainment systems in the 1940s and early 1950s.

Their leading business was wire recorders. They purchased the rights to produce recorders in 1945 from the Armour Research Foundation. Webster-Chicago simplified the design and developed a recorder that sold for only $150, half the price of competing models. By the 1950s it was the leading manufacturer of wire recorders in the United States.

The wire recorder business was short-lived. In 1952 Webcor introduced its first magnetic tape recorder, and by 1955 magnetic tape recorders overtook wire ones.

In the 1960s the firm began to face strong competition from German and Japanese imports. It was purchased by US Industries in 1967, and faded from prominence in the 1970s.
