= Your Church in Brisbane City =

- Ann Street Church of Christ
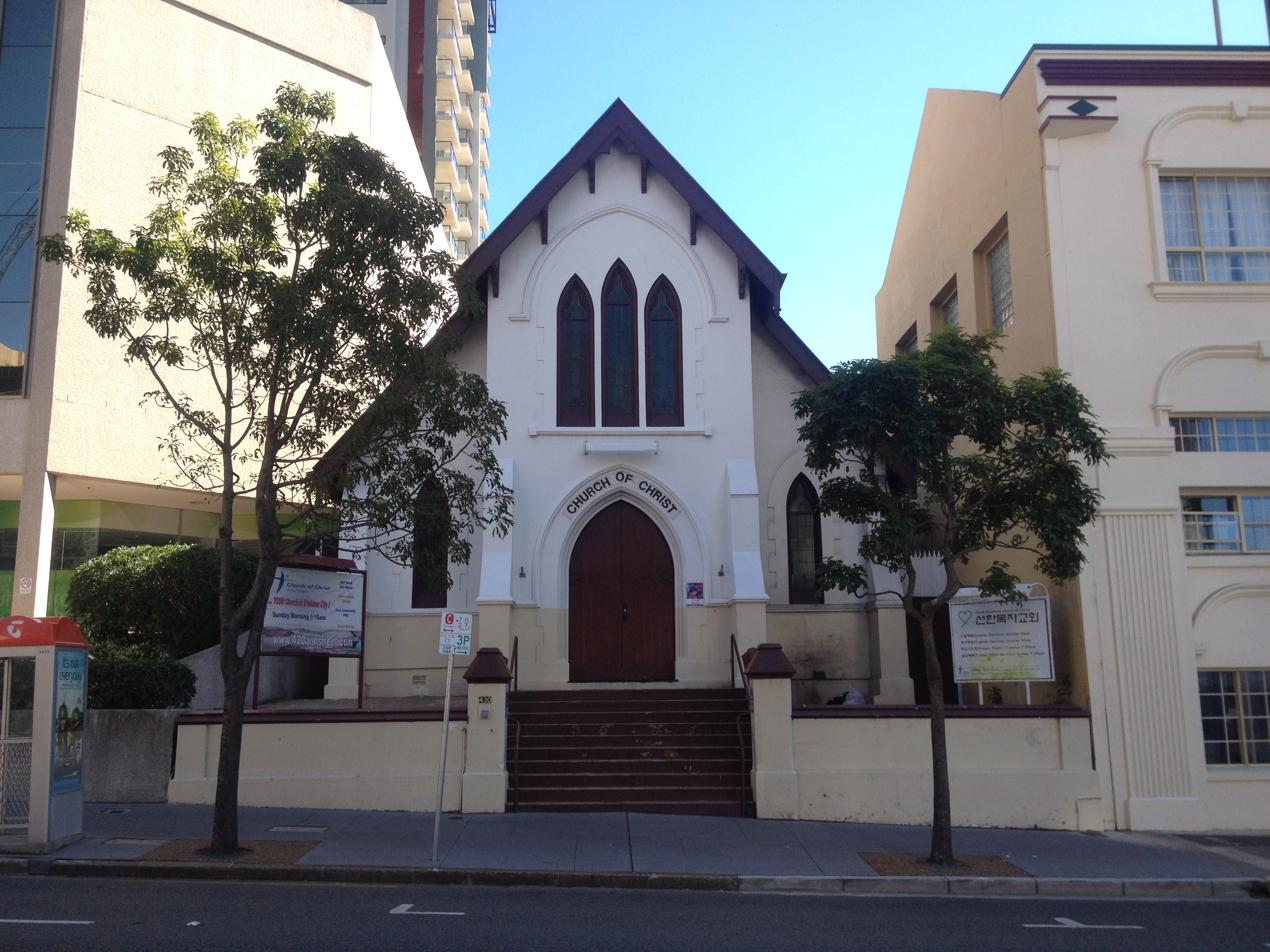
- Ann Street Church of Christ, 2014
- Your Church in Brisbane City
- 27°27′46.02″S 153°1′48.68″E
- Address: 430 Ann Street, Brisbane CBD, Queensland
- Country: Australia
- Denomination: Church of Christ (since 1914)
- Previous denomination: Methodist (1881 – 1898)
- Churchmanship: Evangelical
- Website: 430annstreet.org

History
- Status: Church
- Founded: 1881
- Founder: United Methodist Free Church

Architecture
- Functional status: Active
- Architectural type: Church
- Style: Gothic Revival
- Years built: 1881–1883
- Completed: 1883

Your Church in Brisbane City, also known as Ann Street Church of Christ, is a church at 430 Ann Street in the Brisbane central business district, Queensland, Australia. It is affiliated with the Churches of Christ in Australia and holds public worship services each Sunday morning.

== History ==
The Church of Christ congregation was formed on 23 September 1883 when a handful of idealistic Christians gathered in Brisbane to found a new church. The founders were linked by their support of Australian evangelist, Stephen Cheek. Cheek died in early 1883 before the church began. The church was a leading congregation within Churches of Christ in Australia with roots in the Restoration Movement. The church has been known as Disciples of Christ, Ann Street Church of Christ, and Your Church in Brisbane City.

The church building was built in 1881 for the United Methodist Free Church. When it was offered for sale in 1898, the church's minister William and his wife Martha Clapham led the church to purchase it for £1,100 in September 1898.

The church was active in starting other Brisbane churches. In 1912, it held an outreach to Hawthorne and established a Sunday school that in 1914 became the Hawthorne Church of Christ. The Sunday school secretary of the Ann Street Church in the early 1920s was Australian army chaplain John Kenneth Martin.

== Notable parishioners ==
- Allen Brooke CBE (1899–1968), Chaplain-General, was the church's minister in 1939. He left the ministry to serve as a chaplain on the front lines of World War II. and become Chaplain-General of the Australian forces.
- Digby Denham, Premier of Queensland 1911–1915, was a leading member in the late 1800s and early 1900s. He was Premier from 1911–1915 and helped establish the University of Queensland and the Queensland Ambulance Service.
- Alexander Russell Main (1877–1945), theologian, the church's minister from 1900–1903

== Gallery ==
Photo of the 1901 Ann Street Church of Christ women's sewing group

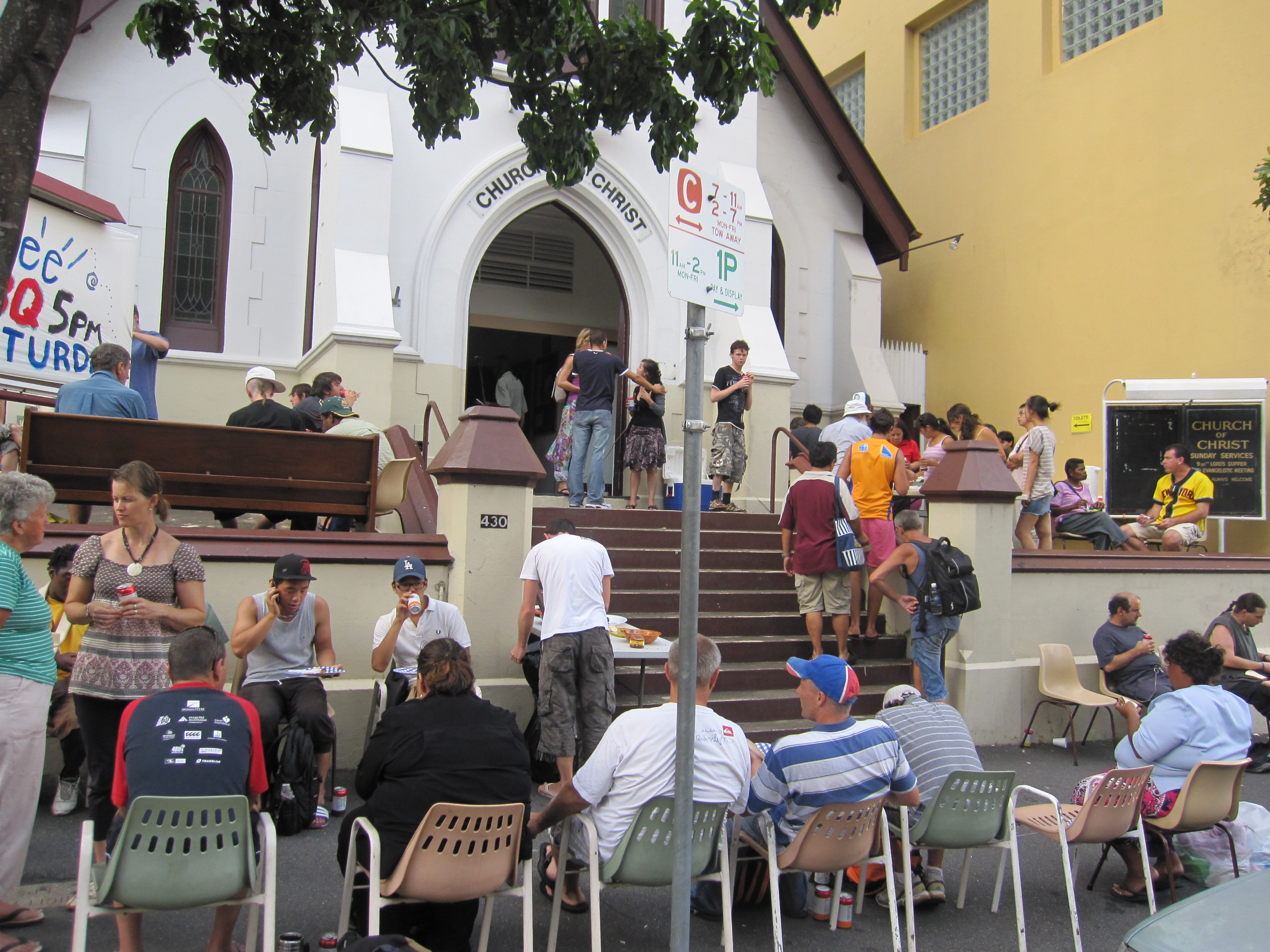
On the last Saturday of the month the church holds a free community barbecue.
