= IIT Research Institute =

American think tank

IITRI
- Type: Non-profit organization
- Industry: Contract Research Organizations; Pharmaceutical; Biotechnology
- Founded: 1936
- Headquarters: Chicago, Illinois
- Products: pre-clinical drug development services
- Number of employees: 150
- Website: www.iitri.org

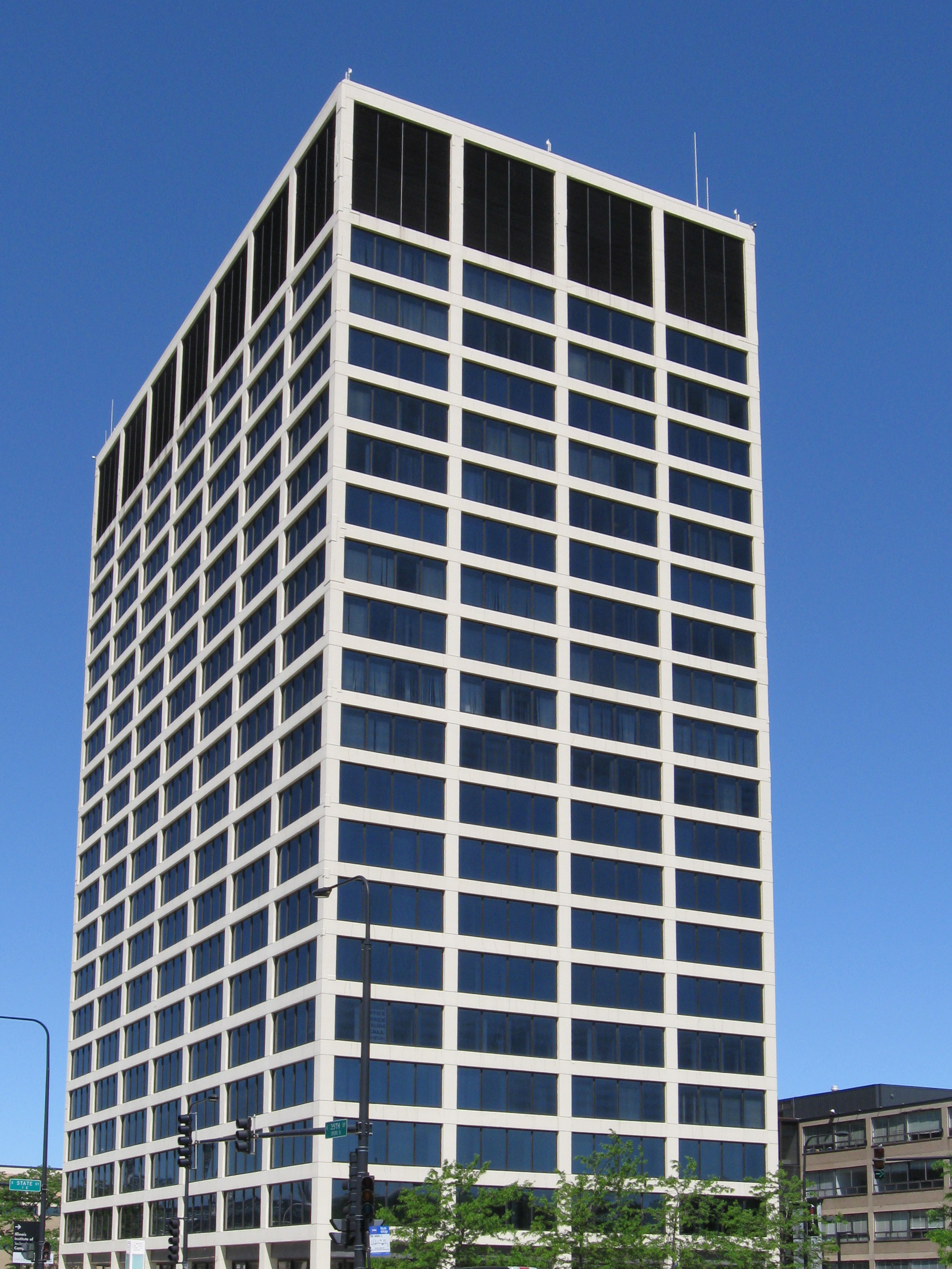
IITRI Tower (Built 1964–65; Dedicated 1966)

IIT Research Institute (IITRI), (Note: "IITRI" (or "iiTRi") is used on cover sheets of technical paper documents in prior decades.) also known historically and interchangeably as IIT Research Center, (Note: "IIT Research Center" appears under document title heading labels used on cover sheets of technical paper documents in prior decades. This can also appear together on the same sheet with the background abbreviation "IITRI" (or "iiTRi").) (Note: "IIT Research Center" appears on one of the recipient address pages (p. 23) in Rome, New York on the lower right side of the Gama; et al. (2004) reference.) is a high-technology scientific research organization and applied research laboratory located in Chicago, Illinois. Previously known as the Armour Research Foundation, (Note: Actual letter stationery in the period notes in its header "IIT Research Institute" as the primary letterhead first line. The second line underneath has the name "Formerly Armour Research Foundation of Illinois Institute of Technology". Both lines are in upper case block type with address, etc. information below as the third line. The left of the letterhead has an IITRI upended rectangular box with five straight non-parallel intersecting lines with a dark field, and the letters IITRI in caps at the box bottom in its own white background field (the second "I" and the "R" being subscript slightly to the rest of the letters). For example, see the Zerlaut; et al. (1964) ref. Additionally, some journal articles of the transition period, particularly for author information, show "IIT Research Institute (formerly Armour Research Foundation)". For example, see the Weil & Daniel (1964) ref.) the IITRI is an independent corporation that operates collaboratively with the Illinois Institute of Technology (IIT) and the U.S. Government.

== History of IITRI ==
IITRI was formed in 1936 (Note: Incorporation date shows as 1936 April 06, which is the original date of the Armour Research Foundation. The file name is currently under the entity of IIT Research Institute, which would have been done by filing a change of name as an amendment to the articles of incorporation at a later date, thus allowing retention of the original Armour incorporation date.) as the Armour Research Foundation (ARF), and was renamed IITRI in 1963. Initially, ARF was formed to support the research endeavors of faculty members from the Armour Institute of Technology, predecessor to the Illinois Institute of Technology (IIT).

IITRI is headquartered on the IIT campus in Chicago, but operates as an independent, not-for-profit research organization. Between its founding in 1936 and 2000, IITRI developed research operations in approximately two dozen locations across the United States. The IITRI staff grew to approximately 1700 employees who performed research and development programs with an annual research budget exceeding $200 M per year. Historically, as a major national science research center, work involved both unclassified and classified (secret) research.

In 2002, IITRI became entirely focused on the life sciences. All other science and engineering divisions were spun off into Alion Science and Technology, a separate employee-owned corporation. Since 2002, research at IITRI has been entirely focused on biomedical research, with particular emphasis on pre-clinical toxicology, safety evaluations, and drug discovery and development.

In 2006, IITRI formed Technology Research, Inc. (TRI), as a wholly owned subsidiary in which research programs that fall outside of IITRI's not-for-profit charter can be conducted.

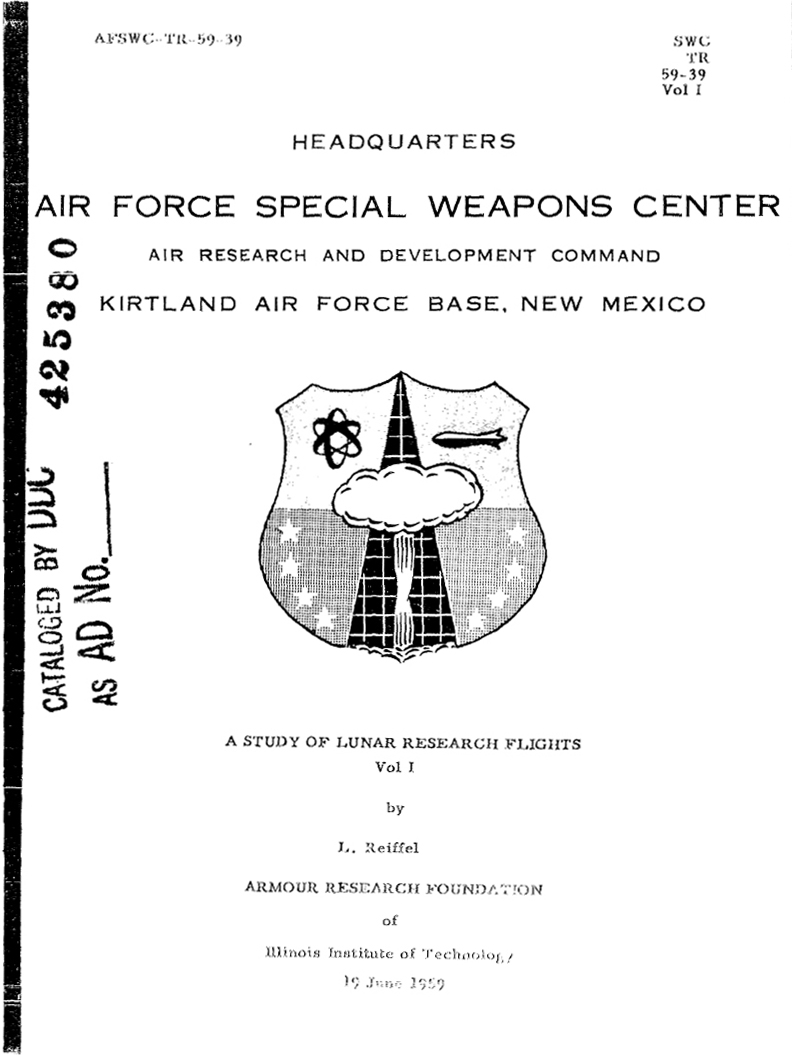
Cover of A Study of Lunar Research Flights – Volume I technical report on 1959 June 19 by Leonard Reiffel of the Armour Research Foundation involving flight paths for Project A119.

=== Research history ===
Research and development programs explored as an engineering think tank over the decades have involved many areas of science, including applied physics, high energy physics, upper atmosphere research (aeronomy), nuclear physics, nuclear attack survival, numerical and computer simulations, electron microscopes and microscopy, police technologies, military, luminescence, aerosols, spacecraft thermal protective coatings, material effects by solar radiation, energy work, and mining engineering. The invention of the modern cellphone was developed here. Early research into magnetics here would cause the development of early wire recorders (fostering modern tape recording), and later the new field of computer science.

=== Patents ===
Numerous patents over the decades have resulted from work by its researchers, including as an assignee under "IIT Research Institute". (Note: For example: U.S. Patent 3,564,154, issued February 16, 1971, by inventor Marvin Camras, for "Cathode Ray Tube Magnetic Reproducer For Video"; and more recently U.S. Patent 6,461,290, issued October 8, 2002, by inventor David A. Reichman; et al., for "Collapsible Isolation Apparatus", involving isolation of a patient in a controlled environment protecting the transported patient against biological or chemical hazards.)

=== Awards ===
Several of its engineer scientists have distinguished themselves as recipients of the National Medal of Technology or the National Medal of Science, in addition to other awards.

== Current activities ==
Current investigations at IITRI are focused on biomedicine as a contract research organization (CRO), with particular emphasis on non-clinical toxicology, inhalation toxicology and technology, microbiology and molecular biology, and drug discovery and development for cancer and infectious diseases. IITRI conducts research programs with particular emphasis on studies to support Investigational New Drug applications and New Drug applications to the U.S. Food and Drug Administration.

== Current Divisions of IITRI ==
IITRI currently performs research in five Technical Divisions: Toxicology, Inhalation Toxicology, Microbiology and Molecular Biology, Carcinogenesis and Cancer Chemoprevention, and Drug Discovery.

=== Toxicology ===
Scientists working in IITRI's Toxicology Division have performed non-clinical toxicology studies for U.S. Government and medical industry sponsors for more than thirty years. Current programs involve acute, subchronic and chronic studies in both rodent and non-rodent model systems to support new drug research. In addition to general toxicology studies, IITRI scientists routinely perform pharmacokinetics and metabolism (PK/ADME) studies, reproductive toxicology studies, safety pharmacology studies, and studies involving a variety of specializations and clinical endpoints. A particular strength of the scientific staff is the integration of non-routine evaluations (genomics/gene expression, cell biology, biochemistry, and enzymology) into the conduct of non-clinical toxicology protocols.

=== Inhalation Toxicology ===
IITRI's Inhalation Toxicology Division integrates the efforts of doctoral-level inhalation scientists and engineers with experienced, doctoral-level toxicologists to conduct non-clinical toxicology studies in support of Investigational New Drug (IND) and New Drug (NDA) Applications. Studies are performed in both rodent and non-rodent species.

Nose-only and whole body exposures are performed using metered dose inhalers, nebulizers, atomizers, powder dispensers, and vapor generation systems, with continuous on-line monitoring to document test atmosphere composition. Study endpoints are similar to those performed by scientists of the Toxicology Division, and commonly involve safety evaluations.

Safety Pharmacology studies are performed to determine the effects of drugs and other xeniobiotics on the function of the central nervous, respiratory, cardiovascular, and urinary/renal systems. Cardiovascular safety pharmacology studies are performed using telemetry instrumentation.

=== Microbiology and Molecular Biology ===
Scientists working in IITRI's Microbiology and Molecular Biology Division work in genetic toxicology, immunotoxicology, applied microbiology, genomics and gene expression, and molecular diagnostics.

Genetic Toxicologists at IITRI routinely perform bacterial mutagenesis assays (Ames Tests), mammalian mutagenesis assays (mouse lymphoma and other tests), DNA damage assays (micronucleus and chromosomal aberration assays), and cytotoxicity assays.

Molecular biologists perform a wide range of studies in gene expression, including genomics evaluations using several different platforms.

IITRI has studied immunotoxicology for more than 25 years. In the early 1980s, IITRI scientists were key participants in the original tripartite program (with the NIEHS and the Medical College of Virginia) in which murine immunotoxicology bioassays were developed and validated. Subsequently, IITRI scientists played a major role in the development and validation of the local lymph node assay (LLNA) for the rapid detection of agents that induce hypersensitivity.

IITRI's Microbiology and Molecular Biology Division operates both Biosafety Level-2 and Biosafety Level-3 laboratories for in vitro and in vivo studies, and is approved by the United States Centers for Disease Control and Prevention (CDC) to conduct studies with a broad range of pathogenic agents. This work involves molecular diagnostics, drug and vaccine efficacy evaluations, drug and vaccine safety evaluations, and decontamination studies.

=== Carcinogenesis and Cancer Chemoprevention ===
The focus of research efforts in Carcinogenesis and Cancer Chemoprevention Division is the prevention of cancer by pharmacologic, nutritional, or hormonal interventions. IITRI has done preclinical studies of cancer prevention for more than 30 years, and IITRI scientists have published more than 200 peer-reviewed papers in the field.

Originally focused entirely on the prevention of experimental breast cancer, scientists working in IITRI's Carcinogenesis and Chemoprevention Division have conducted studies directed at mechanisms of carcinogenesis and prevention of cancer in the breast, prostate, lung, colon, urinary bladder, oral cavity, liver, skin, and hematopoietic system, among other organ sites. The earliest studies conducted by this group (in the 1970s) focused on the prevention of cancer by natural and synthetic analogs of vitamin A (retinoids). This work has expanded substantially since that time, and currently involves a wide range of natural products (soy isoflavones and protease inhibitors, tea polyphenols, organic selenium compounds, vitamin D and derivatives), hormones and hormone analogs, and pharmacologic agents originally developed for other indications. Mechanistic studies are performed at the cell, biochemical, and molecular levels, and preclinical drug discovery and development studies involve a wide range of in vitro and in vivo screening, efficacy, and preclinical toxicology programs.

=== Drug Discovery ===
The various research efforts in the foregoing divisions supports Drug Discovery Division with Investigational New Drug (IND) Applications and New Drug Applications (NDA) to the U.S. Food and Drug Administration, as well as submissions to other regulatory agencies. Studies comply with Good Laboratory Practice (GLP) regulations. IITRI's expertise in non-clinical studies also supports the development of drugs for cancer prevention and therapy.

== See also ==
- California Institute of Technology
- Massachusetts Institute of Technology
- McCrone Research Institute
- SRI International
- Association of Independent Technological Universities
- Project A119
- ADME
- End point of clinical trials
- Drug development
- Pharmacodynamics

== References (books) ==
- McCormac, Billy M. (editor); et al. (authors)(1967), (book), Aurora and Airglow, Proceedings of the NATO Advanced Study Institute held at the University of Keele, Staffordshire, England, August 15–26, 1966, p. i [title page]; McCormac as editor, of the Physics Division, IIT Research Institute [p. i], Chicago, Illinois; 1967 [p. ii] Reinhold Publishing Corporation.

== References (journals) ==
- Mehta, Rajendra G.; Murillo, Genoveva; Naithani, Rajesh; & Peng, Xinjian (2010), (journal article), "Cancer Chemoprevention by Natural Products: How Far Have We Come?", Pharmaceutical Research (ISSN 0724-8741), Vol. 27, Issue 6, pp. 950–961; Springer (publisher); 2010 June.
- Morton, David (1998) (journal article), "Armour Research Foundation and the Wire Recorder: How Academic Entrepreneurs Fail", Technology and Culture (ISSN 0040-165X), Vol. 39, No. 2, pp. 213–244; Society for the History of Technology (publisher); 1998 April.
- Sagripanti, Jose-Luis; Rom, Amanda M.; & Holland, Louis E. (2010), (journal article), "Persistence in darkness of virulent alphaviruses, Ebola virus, and Lassa virus deposited on solid surfaces", Archives of Virology (ISSN 0304-8608), Vol. 155, Issue 12, pp. 2035–2039, December 2010.
- Weil, N.A.; & Daniels, I.M. (1964), (journal article), "Analysis of Fracture Probabilities in Nonuniformly Stressed Brittle Materials", Journal of the American Ceramic Society, Vol. 47, Issue 6, pp. 268–274, 1964 June.

== References (newspapers) ==
- Boston Globe, 1980 March 25, p. 1 (Economy); McMillan, Gary (Globe staff); "Four leaders of America's energy business".
- Los Angeles Times, 1942 June 21, p. 17; "Recording of Sound on Wire Thin as Human Hair Developed".

== References (technical literature, & other) ==
- Firestone, Ross F.; & Harada, Yoshiro (1979), (technical report), "Evaluation of the Effects of Solar Radiation on Glass", IIT Research Institute, Chicago, Illinois; for NASA Marshall Space Flight Center; IITRI Project D6139; Final Report No. D6139; 1979 January 31; U.S. Government Accession No. N79-26209.
- Gama, Bazle A.; Xiao, Jia-Run; Haque, Md. J.; Yen, Chian-Fong; & Gillespie, Jr., John W. (2004), (technical paper), "Experimental and Numerical Investigations on Damage and Delamination in Thick Plain Weave S-2 Glass Composites Under Quasi-Static Punch Shear Loading", Army Research Laboratory (ARL), ARL-CR-534, Aberdeen Proving Ground, Maryland; [prepared by] Center for Composite Materials [CCM], University of Delaware, Newark, Delaware, 2004 February; under contract DAAD19-01-2-0001 and DAAD19-01-2-0005; p. 23; [CCM: Gama, Xiao, Haque, Gillespie; MSC (Material Sciences Corporation): Yen].
- Gilligan, J.E.; & Harada, Y. (1976), (technical report), "Development of Space-Stable Thermal Control Coatings for Use on Large Space Vehicles", IIT Research Center, Chicago, Illinois; for NASA Marshall Space Flight Center; 1976 March 15; Report No. IITRI-C6233-57; U.S. Government Accession No. N76-23584.
- Greenbaum, Miles A.; & Wheeler, W. John (1967), (technical paper), "Textile Technology From Aerospace Research", [Prepared under NASA contract by] IIT Research Center, Technology Utilization Center, 1967 June 9; NASA Ref. No. CR97195; U.S. Government Accession No. N68-36655.
- Illinois Institute of Technology (2004), (annual report), 2003 Fiscal Year "Report on Research": "Inventing the Future Together (A Report on Research at IIT) (Highlighting advances in basic and applied research, technology transfer and commercialization."; published by the Graduate College at Illinois Institute of Technology, Chicago, Illinois; copyright 2004.
- Szpakiewicz, Michael; Schatzinger, R.; Jackson, S.; Sharma, B.; Cheng, A.; & Honarpour, Matt (1990), (technical paper), "Selection of a Second Barrier Island Reservoir System for Expanding the Shoreline Barrier Reservoir Model and Refining NIPER Reservoir Characterization Methodology" [Status Report], NIPER-472, National Institute for Petroleum and Energy Research (NIPER), IIT Research Institute [cover sheet i]/IIT Research Center [cover sheet ii], Bartlesville, Oklahoma, 1990 April.
- Zerlaut, Gene A. (letter author); (with contributing personnel) Allen, Mrs. J.; Raziunas, Mr. Victor; Kaye, Dr. Brian; & Katz, Dr. Sidney, (1964), (technical letter report), "Investigation of Light Scattering in Highly Reflecting Pigmented Coatings", "January 1 through March 1, 1964" [quarterly progress letter], 6 pages (pp. 1–4 report letter; pp. 5–6 distribution list), Letter of 1964 March 13; addressed to: Director, National Aeronautics and Space Administration, Attention: Office of Grants and Research Contracts; Report No. IITRI-C6018-7; NASA Ref. No. CR53523; U.S. Government Accession No. N65-16474.
