= Phonograph record =

Disc-shaped analog sound storage medium

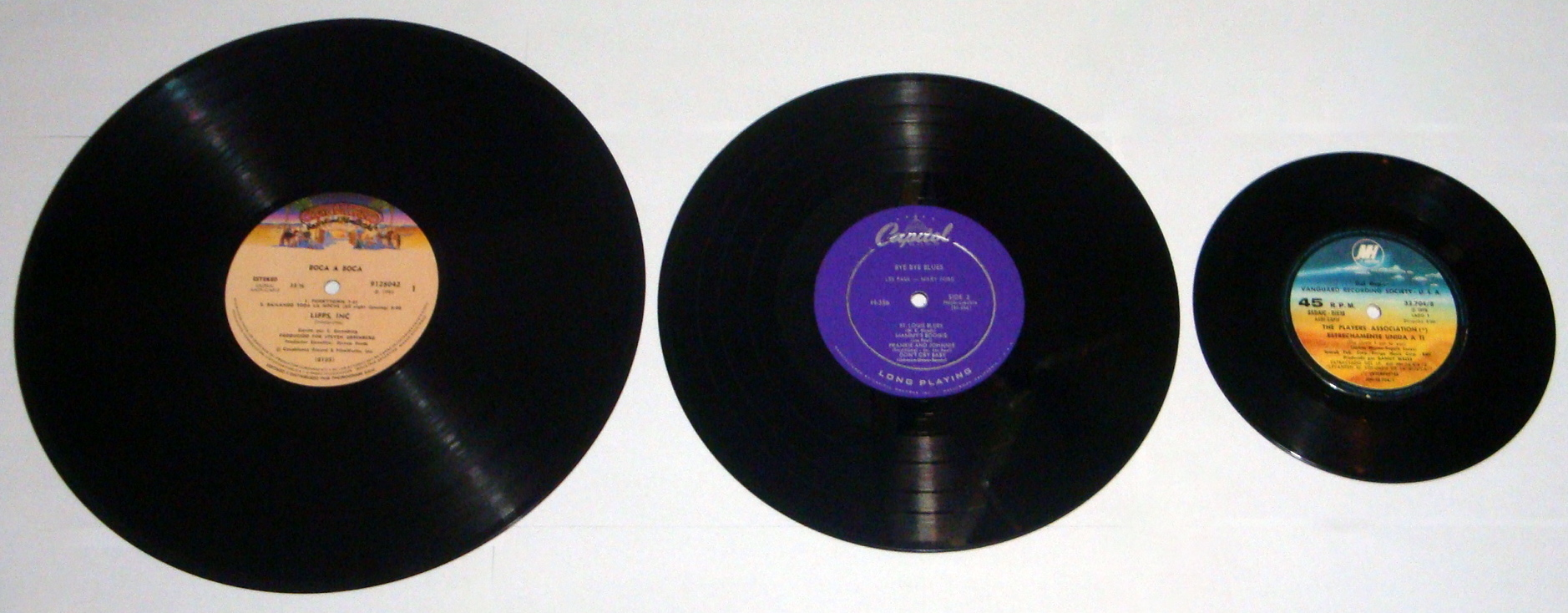
Three vinyl records of different formats, from left to right: a 12 in (300 mm) LP, a 10 in (250 mm) LP, a 7 in (180 mm) single

A phonograph record (also known as a gramophone record, especially in British English) or a vinyl record (for later varieties only) is a disc-shaped analog sound storage medium with an inscribed, modulated spiral groove. The groove usually starts near the outside edge and ends near the center of the disc. The stored sound information is made audible by playing the record on a phonograph (or "gramophone", "turntable", or "record player").

Records have been produced in different formats with playing times ranging from a few minutes to around 30 minutes per side. For about half a century, the discs were commonly made from shellac and these records typically ran at a rotational speed of 78 rpm, giving it the nickname "78s" ("seventy-eights"). This material, "shellac," is made from a natural resin produced by Southeast Asian lac insects , which is made from a natural resin that the female lac bugs leave behind on trees. After being dissolved in alcohol, the resin is processed into shellac.

Regarding the material, there were several reasons why shellac was chosen as a material for 78-rpm records. First, its properties made it suitable for cutting grooves into records. In addition, shellac was resistant to moisture, which made it easier to store the records.

One characteristic of shellac records is that they were more fragile than vinyl records. In addition, 78-rpm records had several other characteristics. 78-rpm records could only hold relatively short recordings. Gramophones had to be operated manually. The needle had to be replaced when it became worn out, and new needles were used to avoid damaging old records.

Unlike 78-rpm records, "Vinyl" records made from polyvinyl chloride (PVC) were introduced in 1948, and by 1958 they became standard, replacing the old 78s and remain so to this day; they have since been produced in various sizes and speeds, most commonly 7 in (180 mm) discs played at 45 rpm (typically for singles, also called 45s ("forty-fives")), and 12 in (300 mm) discs played at 33 1/3 rpm (known as LP's, "long-playing records", typically for full-length albums) – the latter is the most prevalent format today.

== Overview ==
78 rpm video
Video of a 1936 spring-motor-driven 78 rpm acoustic (non-electronic) gramophone playing a shellac record

The phonograph record was the primary medium used for music reproduction throughout the 20th century. It had co-existed with the phonograph cylinder from the late 1880s and had effectively superseded it by around 1912. Records retained the largest market share even when new formats such as the compact cassette were mass-marketed. By the 1980s, digital media, in the form of the compact disc (CD), had gained a larger market share, and the record left the mainstream in 1991. Since the 1990s, records continue to be manufactured and sold on a smaller scale, and during the 1990s and early 2000s were commonly used by disc jockeys (DJs), especially in dance music genres. They were also listened to by a growing number of audiophiles. The phonograph record has made a niche resurgence in the early 21st century, growing increasingly popular throughout the 2010s and 2020s.

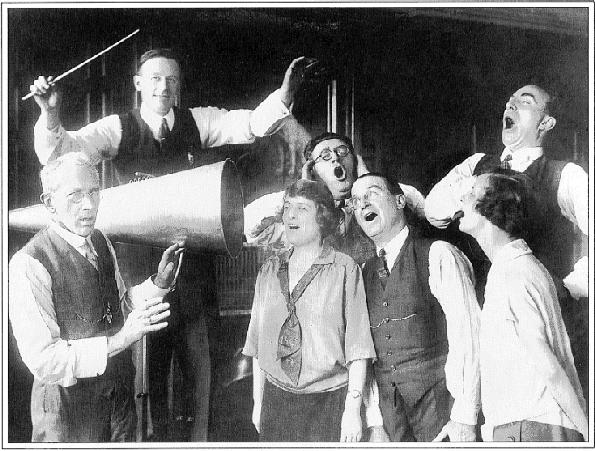
Conductor and cast members of the D'Oyly Carte Opera Company with acoustic recording horn at His Master's Voice, c. 1924

Technicians recording aviator Amy Johnson, Sydney, 1930

Phonograph records are generally described as a single or LP for long playing or their diameter in 12 in (300 mm), 10 in (250 mm), 7 in (180 mm)), the rotational speed in revolutions per minute (rpm) at which they are played (8 1/3, 16 2/3, 33 1/3, 45, 78), and their time capacity, determined by their diameter and speed (LP [long play], 12 in (300 mm) disc, 33 1/3 rpm; EP [extended play], 12 in (300 mm) disc or 7 in (180 mm) disc, 33 1/3 or 45 rpm; Single, 7 in (180 mm) or 10 in (250 mm) disc, 45 or 78 rpm); their reproductive quality, or level of fidelity (high-fidelity, orthophonic, full-range, etc.); and the number of audio channels (mono, stereo, quad, etc.).

=== Naming ===
The various names have included phonograph record (American English), gramophone record (British English), record, vinyl, LP (originally a trademark of Columbia Records), black disc, album, and more informally platter, wax, or liquorice pizza.

== Early development ==
Manufacture of disc records began in the late 19th century, at first competing with earlier cylinder records. Price, ease of use and storage made the disc record dominant by the 1910s. The standard format of disc records became known to later generations as "78s" after their playback speed in revolutions per minute, although that speed only became standardized in the late 1920s. In the late 1940s, new formats pressed in vinyl, the 45-rpm single and 33-rpm long playing LP, were introduced, gradually overtaking the formerly standard "78s" over the next decade. The late 1950s saw the introduction of stereophonic sound on commercial discs.

=== Predecessors ===
The phonautograph was invented by 1857 by Frenchman Édouard-Léon Scott de Martinville. It could not, however, play back recorded sound, as he intended for people to read back the tracings, which he called phonautograms. Prior to this, tuning forks had been used in this way to create direct tracings of the vibrations of sound-producing objects, as by English physicist Thomas Young in 1807.

In 1877, Thomas Edison invented the first phonograph, which etched sound recordings onto phonograph cylinders. Unlike the phonautograph, Edison's phonograph could both record and reproduce sound, via two separate needles, one for each function.

=== The first disc records ===
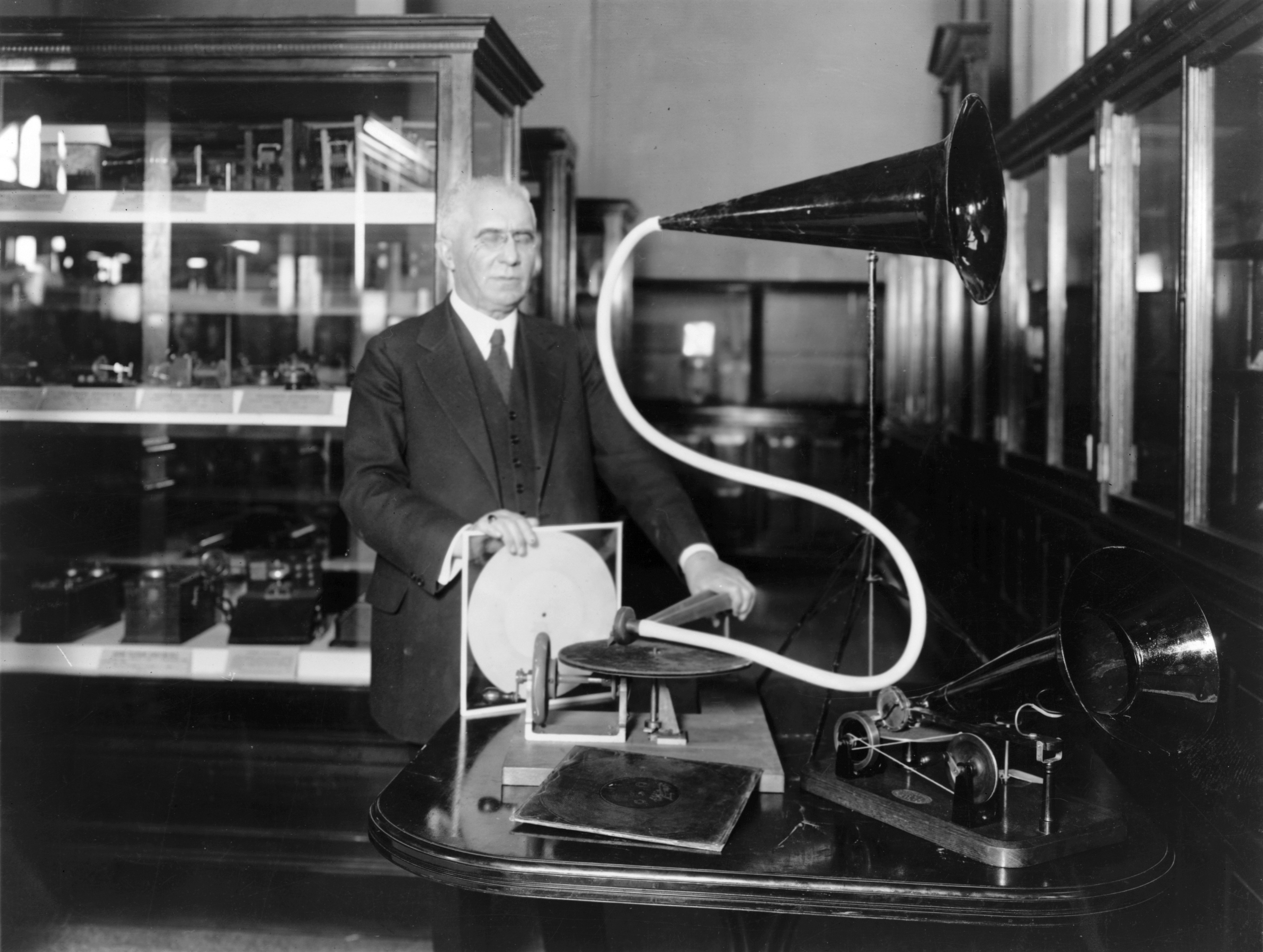
Emile Berliner with disc record gramophone

The first commercially sold disc records were created by Emile Berliner in the 1880s. Emile Berliner improved the quality of recordings while his manufacturing associate Eldridge R. Johnson, who owned a machine shop in Camden, New Jersey, eventually improved the mechanism of the gramophone with a spring motor and a speed regulating governor, resulting in a sound quality equal to Edison's cylinders. Abandoning Berliner's "Gramophone" trademark for legal reasons in the United States, Johnson's and Berliner's separate companies reorganized in 1901 to form the Victor Talking Machine Company in Camden, New Jersey, whose products would come to dominate the market for several decades.

Berliner's Montreal factory, which became the Canadian branch of RCA Victor, still exists. There is a dedicated museum in Montreal for Berliner (Musée des ondes Emile Berliner).

== 78 rpm disc developments ==
=== Early speeds ===
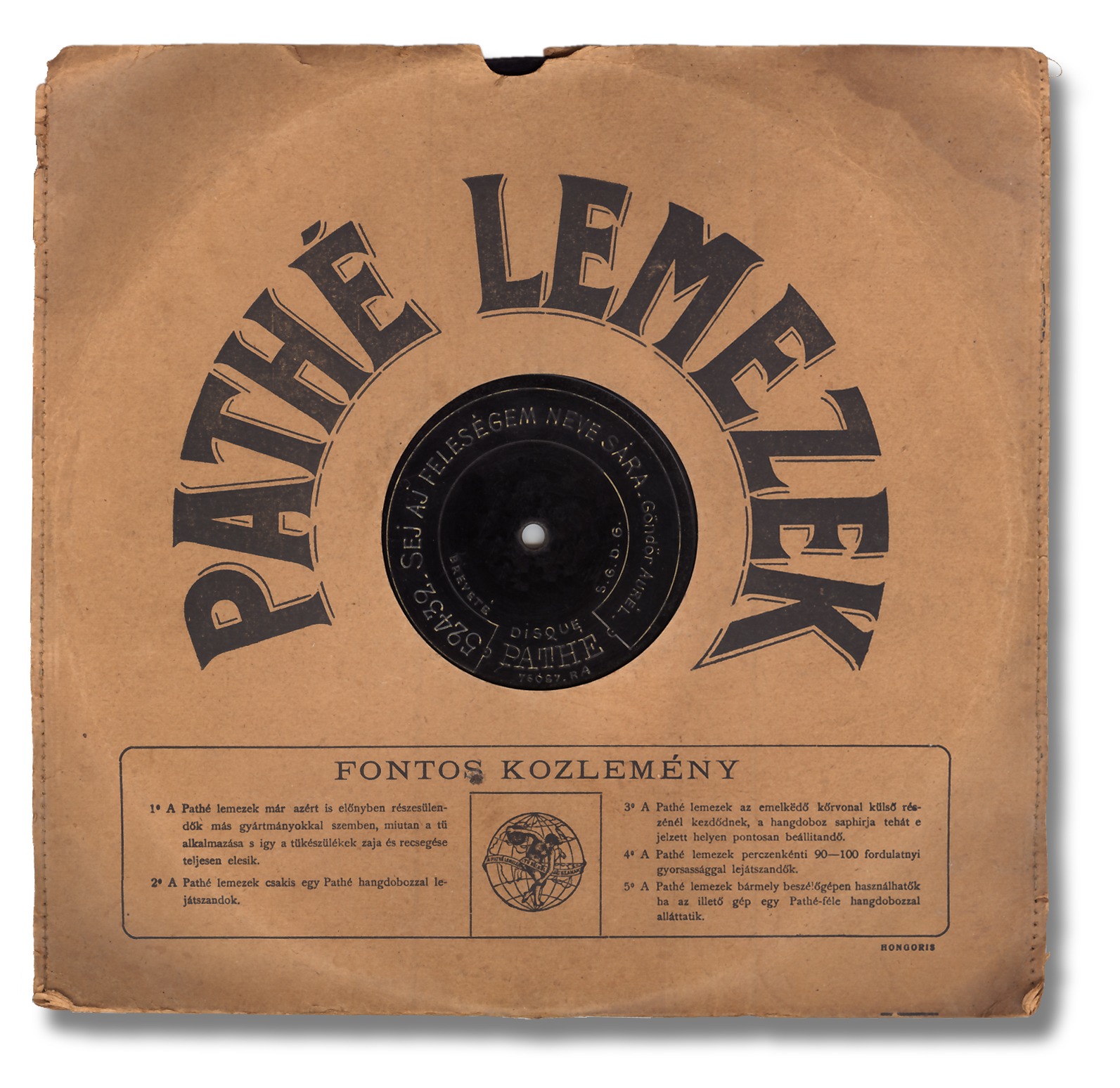
Hungarian Pathé record, 90 to 100 rpm

Early disc recordings were produced in a variety of speeds ranging from 60 to 130 rpm, and a variety of sizes. As early as 1894, Emile Berliner's United States Gramophone Company was selling single-sided 7-inch (180 mm) discs with an advertised standard speed of "about 70 rpm".

One standard audio recording handbook describes speed regulators, or governors, as being part of a wave of improvement introduced rapidly after 1897. A picture of a hand-cranked 1898 Berliner Gramophone shows a governor and says that spring drives had replaced hand drives. It notes that:

The speed regulator was furnished with an indicator that showed the speed when the machine was running so that the records, on reproduction, could be revolved at exactly the same speed...The literature does not disclose why 78 rpm was chosen for the phonograph industry, apparently this just happened to be the speed created by one of the early machines and, for no other reason continued to be used.

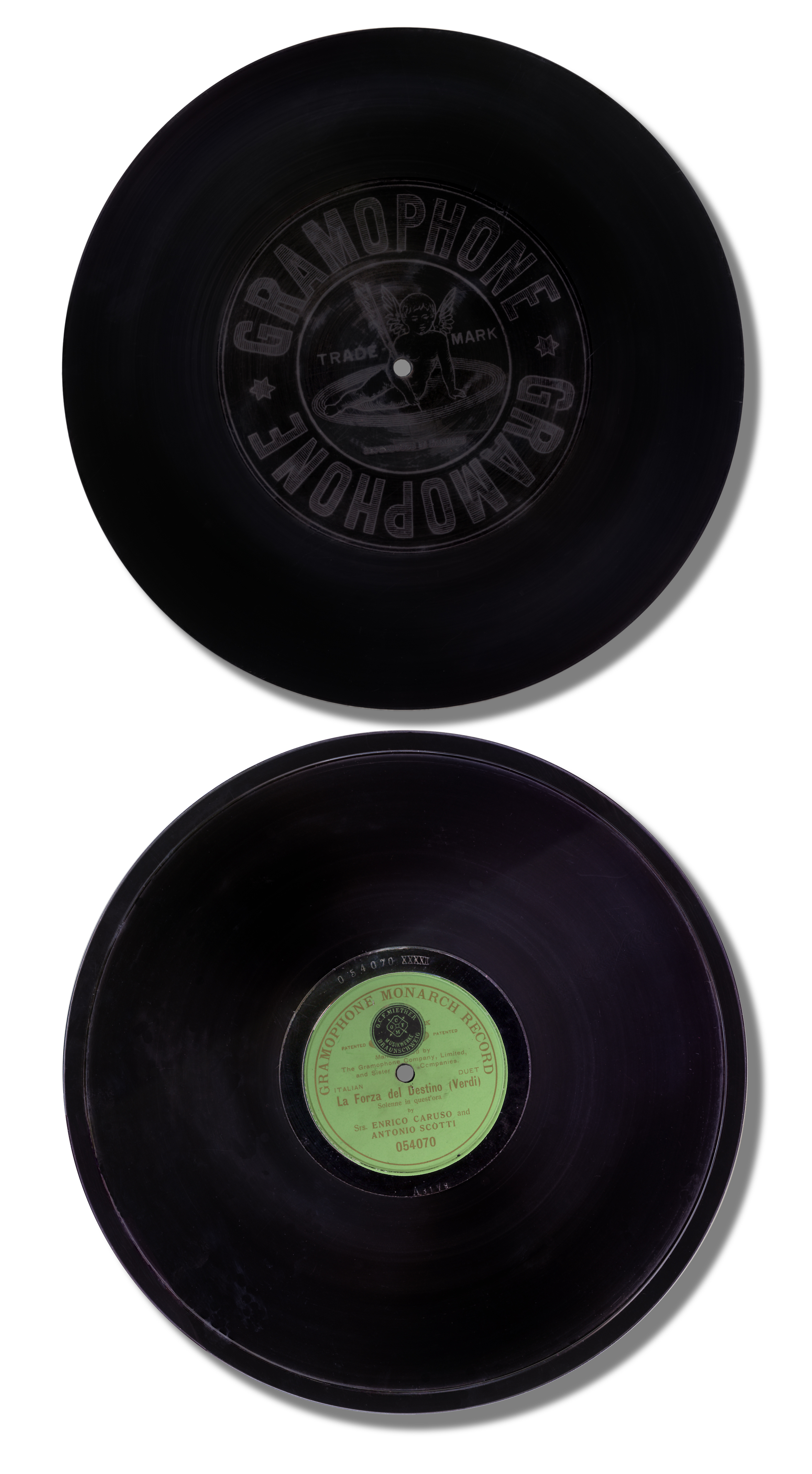
A multinational product: an operatic duet sung by Enrico Caruso and Antonio Scotti, recorded in the US in 1906 by the Victor Talking Machine Company, manufactured c. 1908 in Hanover, Germany, for the Gramophone Company, Victor's affiliate in England

In 1912, the Gramophone Company set 78 rpm as their recording standard, based on the average of recordings they had been releasing at the time, and started selling players whose governors had a nominal speed of 78 rpm. By 1925, 78 rpm was becoming standardized across the industry. However, the exact speed differed between places with alternating current electricity supply at 60 hertz (cycles per second, Hz) and those at 50 Hz. Where the mains supply was 60 Hz, the actual speed was 78.26 rpm: that of a 60 Hz stroboscope illuminating 92-bar calibration markings. Where it was 50 Hz, it was 77.92 rpm: that of a 50 Hz stroboscope illuminating 77-bar calibration markings.

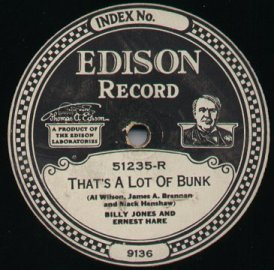
Edison Records Diamond Disc label, early 1920s. Edison Disc Records always ran at 80 rpm.

At least one attempt to lengthen playing time was made in the early 1920s. World Records produced records that played at a constant linear velocity, controlled by Noel Pemberton Billing's patented add-on speed governor.

=== Acoustic recording ===
Early recordings were made entirely acoustically: sound was collected by a horn and piped to a diaphragm, which vibrated the cutting stylus. Sensitivity and frequency range were poor, and frequency response was irregular, giving acoustic recordings an instantly recognizable tonal quality. A singer almost had to put their face in the recording horn. A way of reducing resonance was to wrap the recording horn with tape.

Even drums, if placed properly, could be effectively recorded and heard on even the earliest jazz and military band recordings. The loudest instruments, like drums and trumpets, were positioned further away from the collecting horn. Lillian Hardin Armstrong, a member of King Oliver's Creole Jazz Band, which recorded at Gennett Records in 1923, remembered that at first Oliver and his young second trumpet, Louis Armstrong, stood next to each other and Oliver's horn could not be heard. "They put Louis about 15 ft (5 m) over in the corner, looking all sad."

=== Electrical recording ===
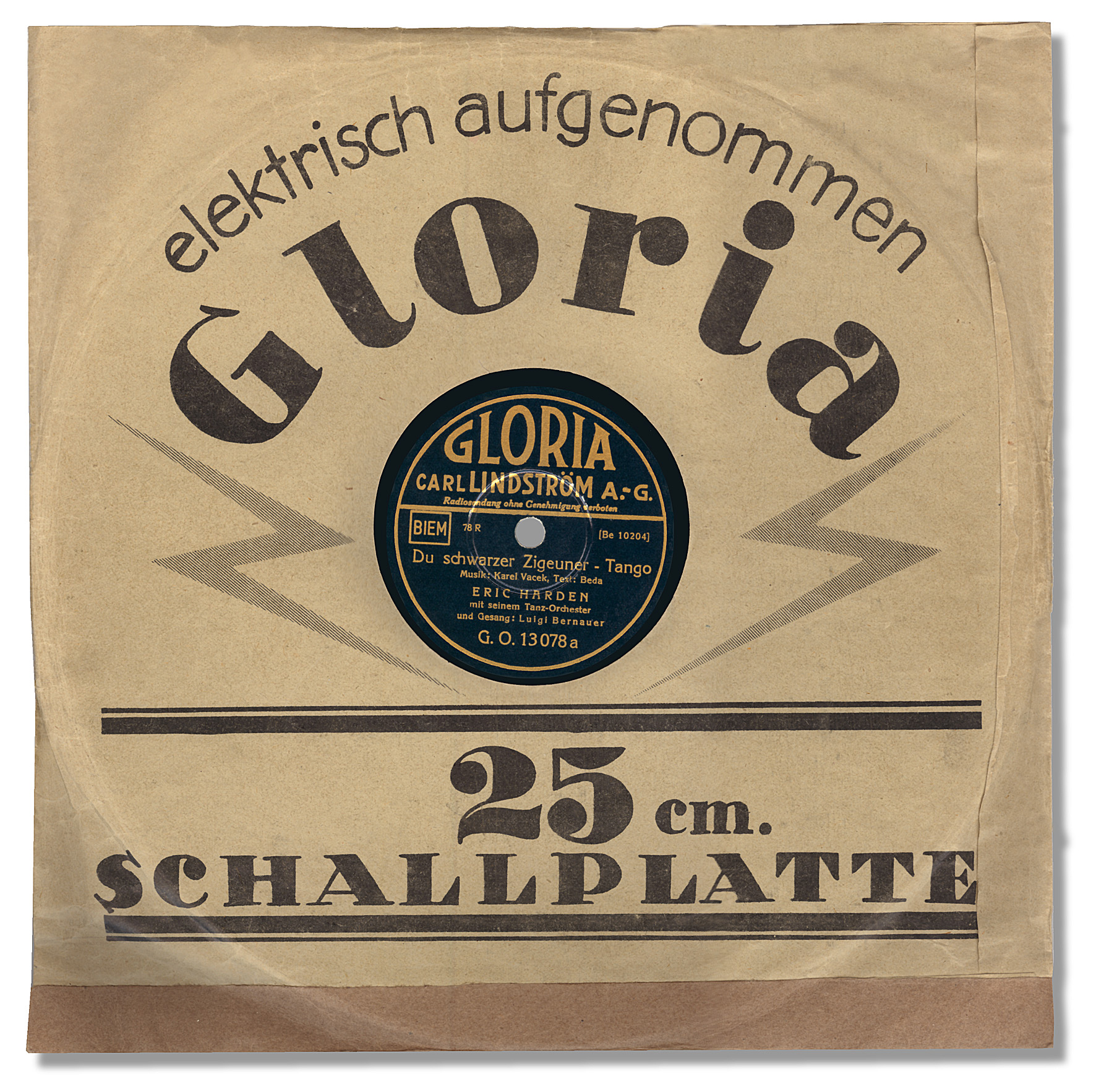
An electronically recorded disc from Carl Lindström AG, Germany, c. 1930

During the first half of the 1920s, engineers at Western Electric, as well as independent inventors such as Orlando Marsh, developed technology for capturing sound with a microphone, amplifying it with vacuum tubes (known as valves in the UK), and then using the amplified signal to drive an electromechanical recording head. Western Electric's innovations resulted in a broader and smoother frequency response, which produced a dramatically fuller, clearer and more natural-sounding recording. Soft or distant sounds that were previously impossible to record could now be captured. Volume was now limited only by the groove spacing on the record and the amplification of the playback device. Victor and Columbia licensed the new electrical system from Western Electric and recorded the first electrical discs during the spring of 1925. The first electrically recorded Victor Red Seal record was Chopin's "Impromptus" and Schubert's "Litanei" performed by pianist Alfred Cortot at Victor's studios in Camden, New Jersey.

A 1926 Wanamaker's ad in The New York Times offers records "by the latest Victor process of electrical recording". It was recognized as a breakthrough; in 1930, a Times music critic stated:

... the time has come for serious musical criticism to take account of performances of great music reproduced by means of the records. To claim that the records have succeeded in exact and complete reproduction of all details of symphonic or operatic performances ... would be extravagant ... [but] the article of today is so far in advance of the old machines as hardly to admit classification under the same name. Electrical recording and reproduction have combined to retain vitality and color in recitals by proxy.

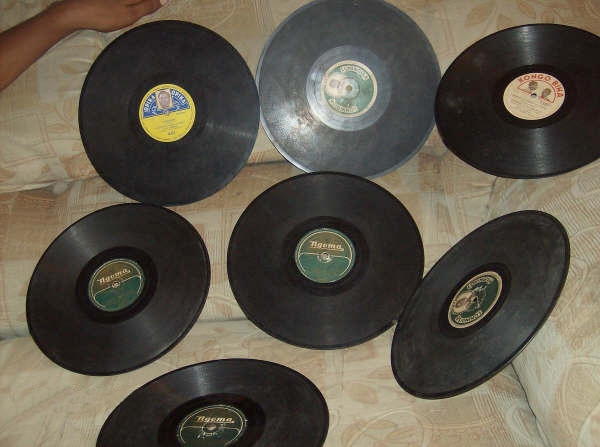
Examples of Congolese 78 rpm records

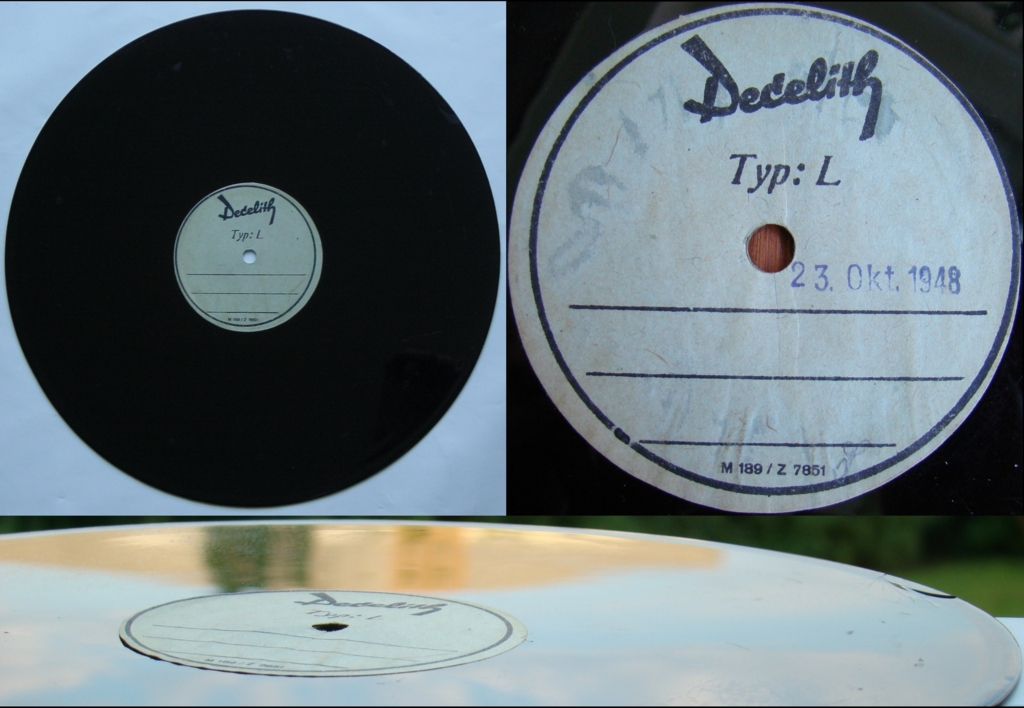
A 10-inch (250 mm) blank for making an individually cut one-off recording made from Decelith, a proprietary PVC-based material produced by a German Company ECW that was used to make commercial flexible blanks prior to World War II

The Orthophonic Victrola had an interior folded exponential horn, a sophisticated design informed by impedance-matching and transmission-line theory, and designed to provide a relatively flat frequency response. Victor's first public demonstration of the Orthophonic Victrola on 6 October 1925, at the Waldorf-Astoria Hotel was front-page news in The New York Times, which reported:

The audience broke into applause ... John Philip Sousa [said]: '[Gentlemen], that is a band. This is the first time I have ever heard music with any soul to it produced by a mechanical talking machine' ... The new instrument is a feat of mathematics and physics. It is not the result of innumerable experiments, but was worked out on paper in advance of being built in the laboratory ... The new machine has a range of from 100 to 5,000 [cycles per second], or five and a half octaves ... The 'phonograph tone' is eliminated by the new recording and reproducing process.

Sales of records plummeted precipitously during the early years of the Great Depression of the 1930s, and the entire record industry in America nearly foundered. In 1932, RCA Victor introduced a basic, inexpensive turntable called the Duo Jr., which was designed to be connected to their radio receivers. According to Edward Wallerstein (the general manager of the RCA Victor Division), this device was "instrumental in revitalizing the industry".

=== 78 rpm materials ===
The production of shellac records continued throughout the 78 rpm era, which lasted until 1948 in industrialized nations.

However, this does not apply to all countries and regions, such as Taiwan. In Taiwan, 78-rpm records continued to be produced and used beyond the period mentioned above. In the mid-1950s, Taiwanese record companies had begun producing 33-rpm vinyl records, which could hold a longer playing time. Although 33-rpm records gradually replaced 78s, 78s survived side by side with 33s for a while. Thus, the transition from 78-rpm records to vinyl records in Taiwan was slower than in industrialized countries. 78-rpm records were used longer than in other regions,and also the timing of transition was varied in different regions.

During the Second World War, the United States Armed Forces produced thousands of 12-inch (300 mm) vinyl 78 rpm V-Discs for use by the troops overseas. After the war, the use of vinyl became more practical as new record players with lightweight crystal pickups and precision-ground styli made of sapphire or an exotic osmium alloy proliferated. In late 1945, RCA Victor began offering "De Luxe" transparent red vinylite pressings of some Red Seal classical 78s, at a de luxe price. Later, Decca Records introduced vinyl Deccalite 78s, while other record companies used various vinyl formulations trademarked as Metrolite, Merco Plastic, and Sav-o-flex, but these were mainly used to produce "unbreakable" children's records and special thin vinyl DJ pressings for shipment to radio stations.

=== Preservation of shellac records ===
Digitization is often used to reduce the handling of fragile discs while maintaining access to contents included in them. Shellac records are generally more fragile than later vinyl records, needing to be carefully preserved. Even though digitization can solve the problem of saving the content, original carriers should be retained whenever possible because future technologies and research may allow improved transfers and analysis. Moreover, the records have historical value, being collected by private collectors and official institutions. Digitization is not the end but the beginning. Digital preservation requires ongoing management, including storage maintenance, metadata management, and migration to newer formats when necessary. Restoration should aim to preserve the integrity of the original recording. Excessive processing may remove historically significant information and reduce its value, being not conducive to retaining the characteristics of the original sound.

=== 78 rpm recording time ===
The playing time of a phonograph record is directly proportional to the available groove length divided by the turntable speed. Total groove length in turn depends on how closely the grooves are spaced, in addition to the record diameter. At the beginning of the 20th century, the early 7-inch (180 mm) discs played for two minutes, the same as cylinder records. The 10-inch (250 mm) disc, introduced by Victor in January 1901, increased the playing time to three and a half minutes. The short-lived 14-inch (360 mm) record was introduced by Victor in the spring of 1903, the 12-inch (300 mm) disc in the summer of 1903 and the 8-inch (200 mm) disc in 1906, all increasing the playing time and fidelity over the 7-inch (180 mm) format. Even before the introduction of 14-inch (360 mm), 12-inch (300 mm) and 8-inch (200 mm), the 10-inch (250 mm) rapidly overtook sales of the 7-inch (180 mm). Because the standard 10-inch (250 mm) 78 rpm record could hold about 3.5 minutes of sound per side, most popular recordings were limited to that duration. For example, when King Oliver's Creole Jazz Band, including Louis Armstrong on his first recordings, recorded 13 sides at Gennett Records in Richmond, Indiana, in 1923, one side was 2:09 and four sides were 2:52–2:59.

In January 1938, Milt Gabler started recording for Commodore Records, and to allow for longer continuous performances, he recorded some 12-inch (300 mm) discs. Eddie Condon explained: "Gabler realized that a jam session needs room for development." The first two recordings did not take advantage of their capability: "Carnegie Drag" was 3m 15s; "Carnegie Jump", 2m 41s. But at the second session, on 30 April, the two 12-inch (300 mm) recordings were longer: "Embraceable You" was 4m 05s; "Serenade to a Shylock", 4m 32s. Another way to overcome the time limitation was to issue a selection extending to both sides of a single record. Vaudeville stars Gallagher and Shean recorded "Mr. Gallagher and Mr. Shean", written by themselves or, allegedly, by Bryan Foy, as two sides of a 10-inch (250 mm) 78 in 1922 for Victor. Longer musical pieces were released as a set of records. In 1903 The Gramophone Company in England made the first complete recording of an opera, Verdi's Ernani, on 40 single-sided discs.

In 1940, Commodore released Eddie Condon and his Band's recording of "A Good Man Is Hard to Find" in four parts, issued on both sides of two 12-inch (300 mm) 78s. The limited duration of recordings persisted from their advent until the introduction of the LP record in 1948. In popular music, the time limit of 3 1/2 minutes on a 10-inch (250 mm) 78 rpm record meant that singers seldom recorded long pieces. One exception is Frank Sinatra's recording of Rodgers and Hammerstein's "Soliloquy", from Carousel, made on 28 May 1946. Because it ran 7m 57s, longer than both sides of a standard 78 rpm 10-inch (250 mm) record, it was released on Columbia's Masterwork label (the classical division) as two sides of a 12-inch (300 mm) record.

In the 78 era, classical-music and spoken-word items generally were released on the longer 12-inch (300 mm) 78s, about 4–5 minutes per side. For example, on 10 June 1924, four months after the 12 February premier of Rhapsody in Blue, George Gershwin recorded an abridged version of the seventeen-minute work with Paul Whiteman and His Orchestra. It was released on two sides of Victor 55225 and ran for 8m 59s.

=== Record albums ===
"Record albums" were originally booklets containing collections of multiple disc records of related material, the name being related to photograph albums or scrap albums. (Conversely, a "single" was a solitary disc as a unit unto itself.) German record company Odeon pioneered the album in 1909 when it released the Nutcracker Suite by Tchaikovsky on four double-sided discs in a specially designed package. It was not until the LP era that an entire album of material could be included on a single record.

=== 78 rpm releases in the microgroove era ===
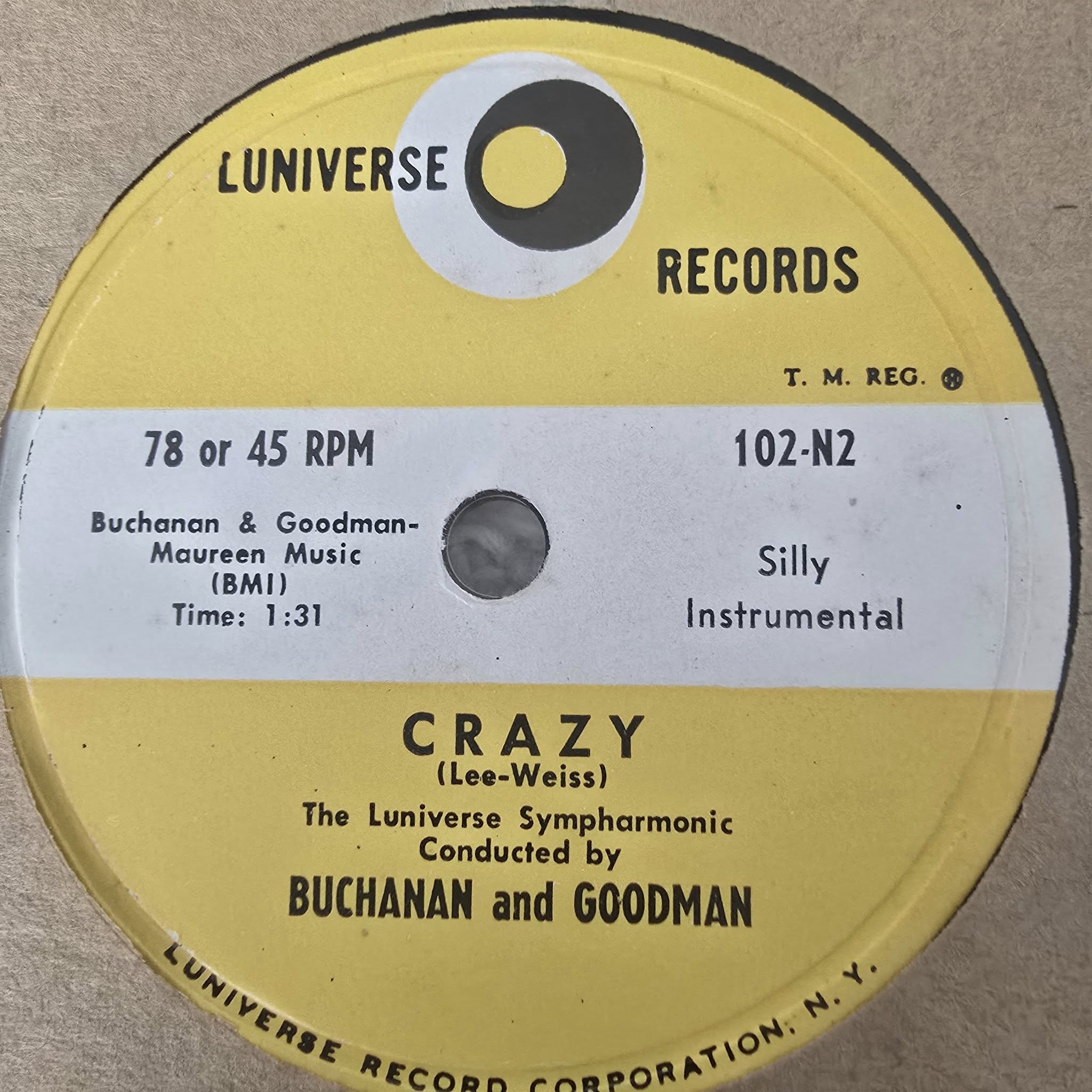
Crazy by Bill Buchanan and Dickie Goodman, a "silly instrumental" to be played at either 78 or 45 rpm

In 1968, when the hit movie Thoroughly Modern Millie was inspiring revivals of Jazz Age music, Reprise planned to release a series of 78 rpm singles from their artists on their label at the time, called the Reprise Speed Series. Only one disc actually saw release, Randy Newman's "I Think It's Going to Rain Today", a track from his self-titled debut album (with "The Beehive State" on the flipside). Reprise did not proceed further with the series due to a lack of sales for the single, and a lack of general interest in the concept.

In 1978, guitarist and vocalist Leon Redbone released a promotional 78 rpm single featuring two songs ("Alabama Jubilee" and "Please Don't Talk About Me When I'm Gone") from his Champagne Charlie album.

In the same vein of Tin Pan Alley revivals, R. Crumb & His Cheap Suit Serenaders issued a number of 78 rpm singles on their Blue Goose record label. The most familiar of these releases is probably R. Crumb & His Cheap Suit Serenaders' Party Record (1980, issued as a "Red Goose" record on a 12-inch (300 mm) single), with the double-entendre "My Girl's Pussy" on the "A" side and the X-rated "Christopher Columbus" on the "B" side.

In the 1990s, Rhino Records issued a series of boxed sets of 78 rpm reissues of early rock and roll hits, intended for owners of vintage jukeboxes. The records were made of vinyl, however, and some of the earlier vintage 78 rpm jukeboxes and record players (the ones that were pre-war) were designed with heavy tone arms to play the hard slate-impregnated shellac records of their time. These vinyl Rhino 78s were softer and would be destroyed by old juke boxes and old record players, but play well on newer 78-capable turntables with modern lightweight tone arms and jewel needles.

As a special release for Record Store Day 2011, Capitol re-released The Beach Boys single "Good Vibrations" in the form of a 10-inch 78 rpm record (b/w "Heroes and Villains"). More recently, The Reverend Peyton's Big Damn Band has released their tribute to blues guitarist Charley Patton Peyton on Patton on both 12-inch (300 mm) LP and 10-inch (250 mm) 78s.

== New sizes and materials after World War II ==
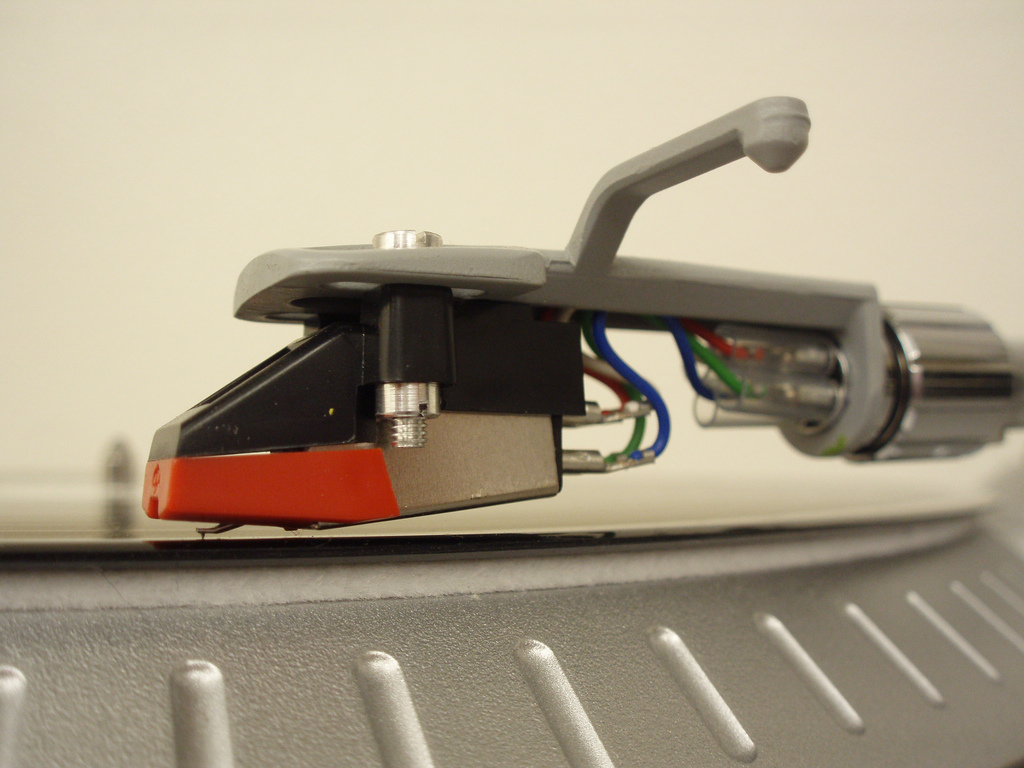
A 10-inch (250 mm) LP being played. The stylus is in contact with the surface.

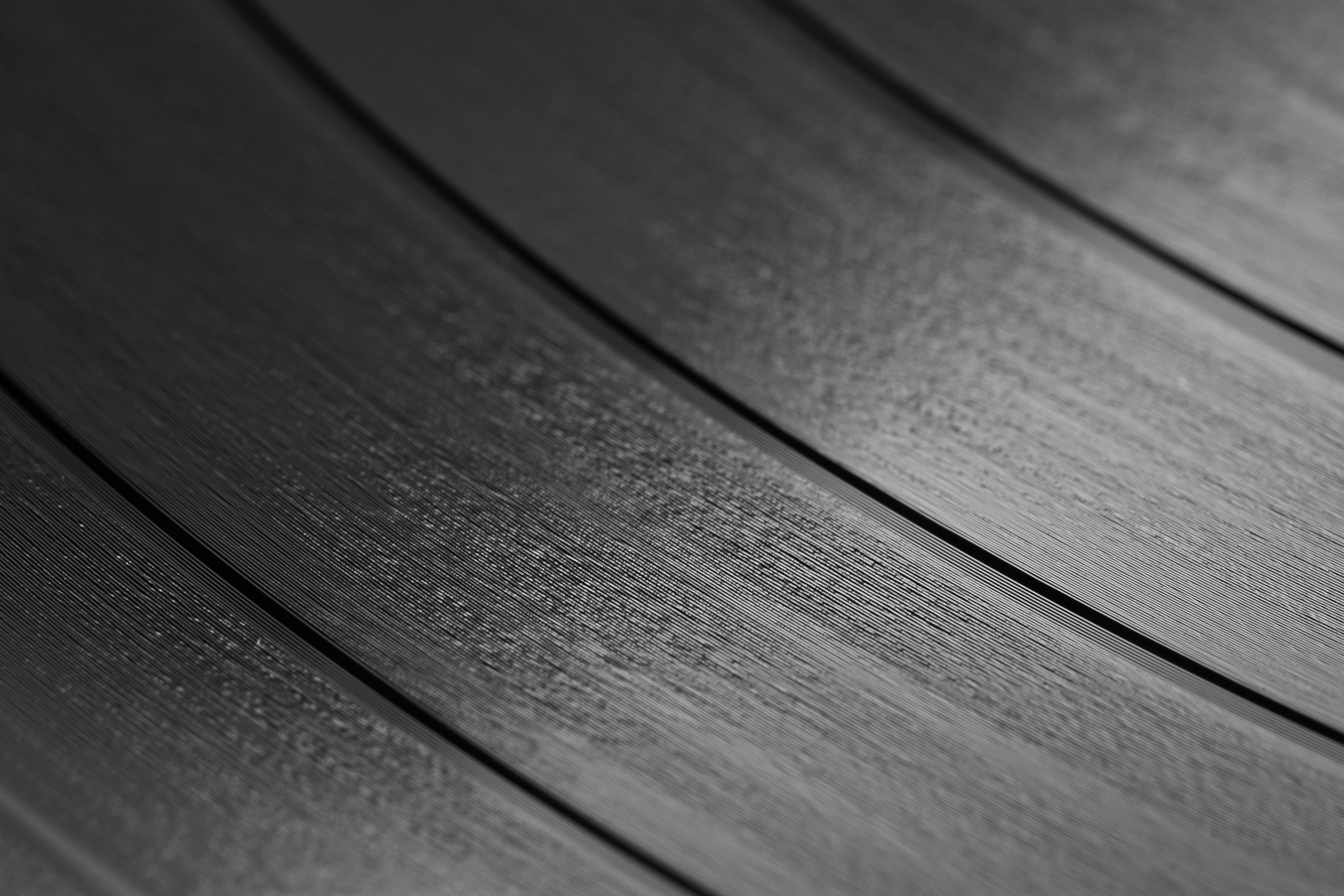
Grooves on a modern 33 1/3 rpm record

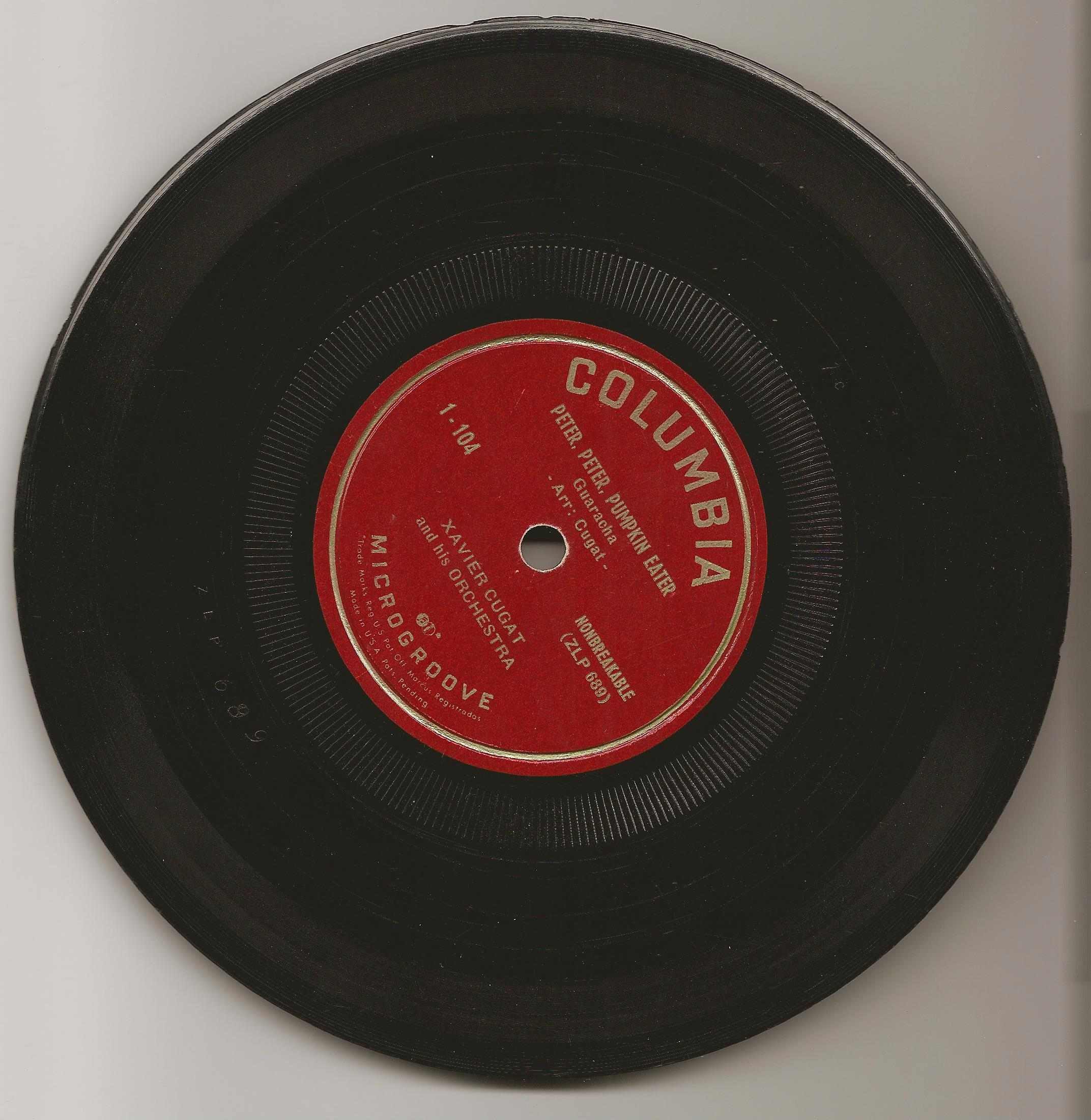
Uncommon Columbia 7-inch (180 mm) vinyl 33 1/3 rpm microgroove ZLP from 1948

CBS Laboratories had long been at work for Columbia Records to develop a phonograph record that would hold at least 20 minutes per side.

Research began in 1939, was suspended during World War II, and then resumed in 1945. Columbia Records unveiled the LP at a press conference in the Waldorf-Astoria on 21 June 1948, in two formats: 10 inches (250 mm) in diameter, matching that of 78 rpm singles, and 12 inches (300 mm) in diameter.

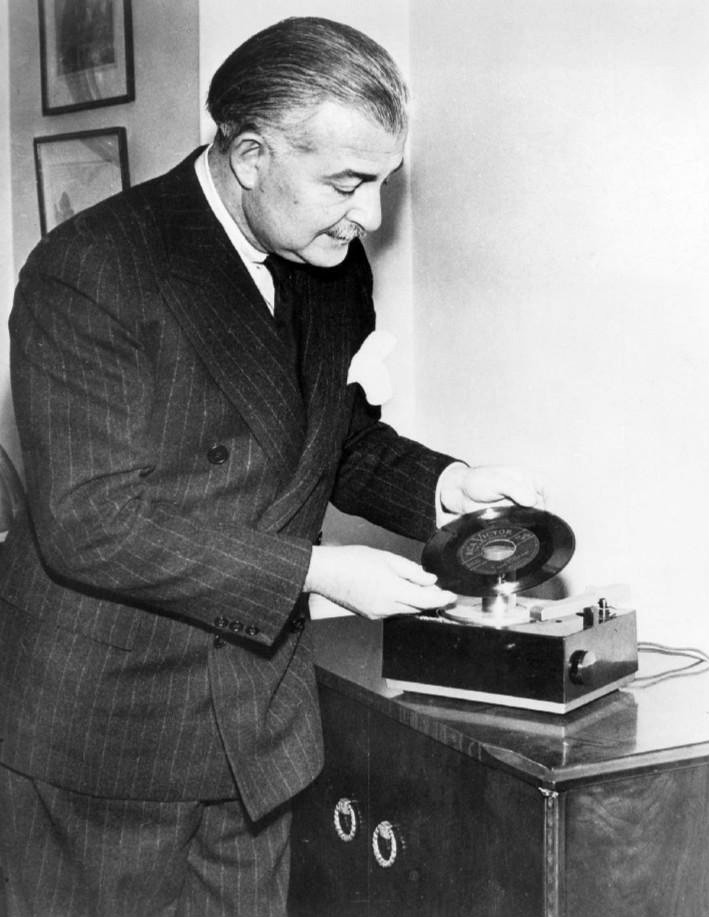
Boston Pops conductor Arthur Fiedler demonstrating the new RCA Victor 45 rpm player and record in February 1949

Unwilling to accept and license Columbia's system, in February 1949, RCA Victor released the first 45 rpm single, 7-inch (180 mm) in diameter with a large center hole. The 45 rpm player included a changing mechanism that allowed multiple disks to be stacked, much as a conventional changer handled 78s. Also like 78s, the short playing time of a single 45 rpm side meant that long works, such as symphonies and operas, had to be released on multiple 45s instead of a single LP, but RCA Victor claimed that the new high-speed changer rendered side breaks so brief as to be inconsequential. Early 45 rpm records were made from either vinyl or polystyrene. They had a playing time of eight minutes.

At first the two systems were marketed in competition, in what was called "The War of the Speeds".

=== Speeds ===
==== Shellac era ====
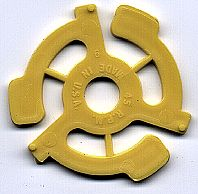
Columbia and RCA Victor's competition extended to equipment. Some turntables included spindle size adapters, but other turntables required snap-in inserts like this one to adapt Victor's larger 45 rpm spindle size to the smaller spindle size available on nearly all turntables. Shown is one popular design in use for many years.

The older 78 rpm format continued to be mass-produced alongside the newer formats using new materials in decreasing numbers until the summer of 1958 in the U.S., and in a few countries, such as the Philippines and India (both countries issued recordings by the Beatles on 78s), into the late 1960s. For example, Columbia Records' last reissue of Frank Sinatra songs on 78 rpm records was an album called Young at Heart, issued in November 1954.

==== Microgroove and vinyl era ====
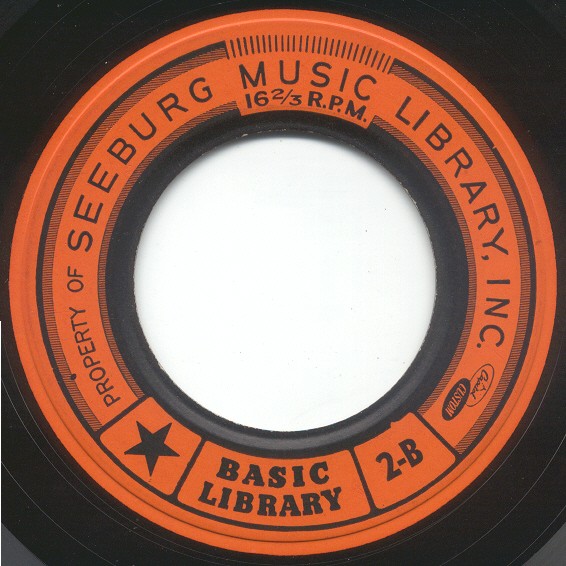
1959 Seeburg 16 rpm record (label only)

Columbia and RCA Victor each pursued their R&D secretly.

The commercial rivalry between RCA Victor and Columbia Records led to RCA Victor's introduction of what it had intended to be a competing vinyl format, the 7-inch (180 mm)) 45 rpm disc, with a much larger center hole. For a two-year period from 1948 to 1950, record companies and consumers faced uncertainty over which of these formats would ultimately prevail in what was known as the "War of the Speeds" (see also Format war). In 1949 Capitol and Decca adopted the new LP format and RCA Victor gave in and issued its first LP in January 1950. The 45 rpm size was gaining in popularity, too, and Columbia issued its first 45s in February 1951. By 1954, 200 million 45s had been sold.

Eventually the 12-inch (300 mm) 33 1/3 rpm LP prevailed as the dominant format for musical albums, and 10-inch (250 mm) LPs were no longer issued. The last Columbia Records reissue of any Frank Sinatra songs on a 10-inch LP record was an album called Hall of Fame, CL 2600, issued on 26 October 1956, containing six songs, one each by Tony Bennett, Rosemary Clooney, Johnnie Ray, Frank Sinatra, Doris Day, and Frankie Laine.

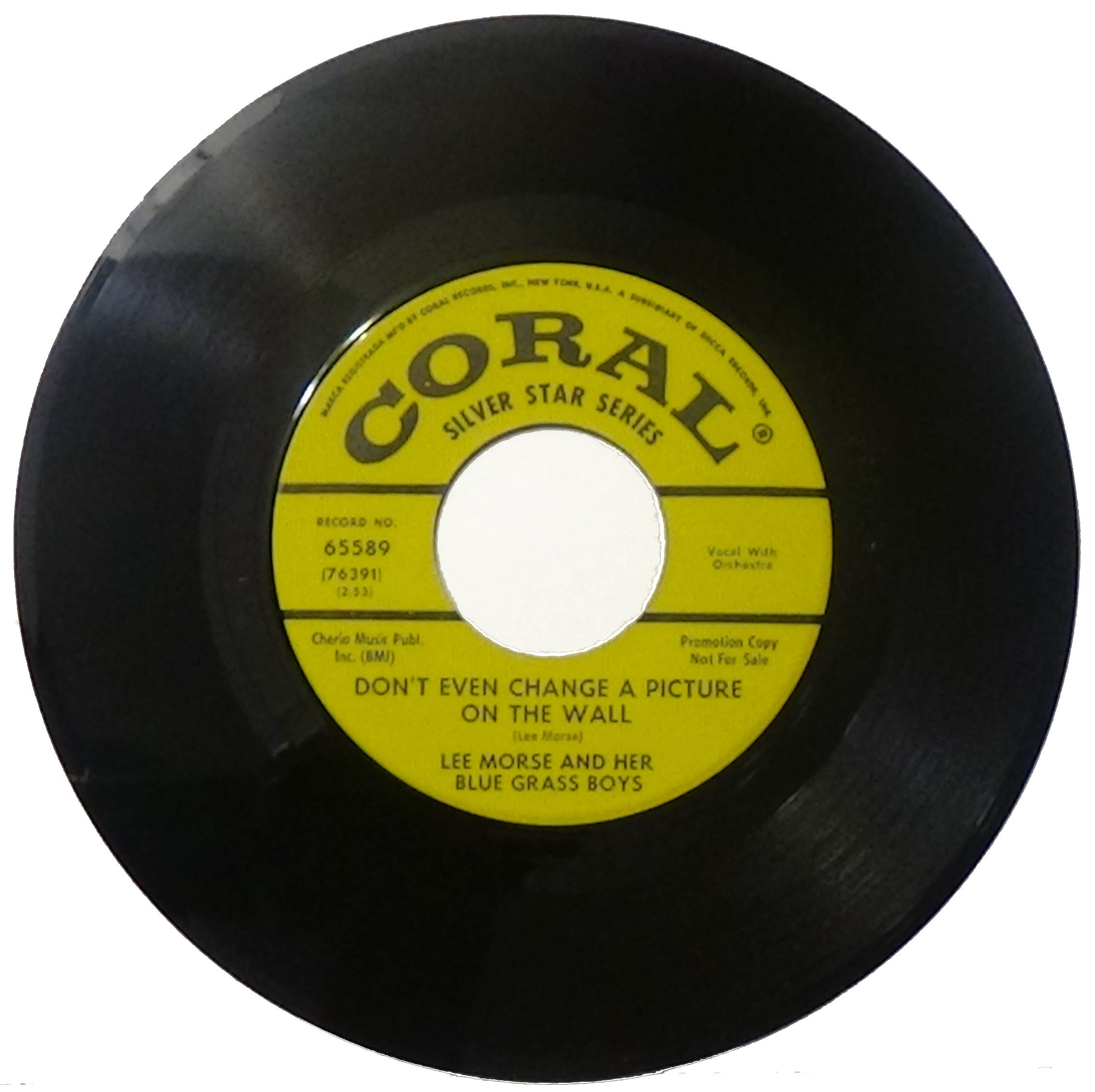
45 rpm vinyl record from 1965

The 45 rpm discs also came in a variety known as extended play (EP), which achieved up to 10–15 minutes play at the expense of attenuating (and possibly compressing) the sound to reduce the width required by the groove. EP discs were cheaper to produce and were used in cases where unit sales were likely to be more limited or to reissue LP albums on the smaller format for those people who had only 45 rpm players. LP albums could be purchased one EP at a time, with four items per EP, or in a boxed set with three EPs or twelve items. The large center hole on 45s allows easier handling by jukebox mechanisms. EPs were generally discontinued by the late 1950s in the U.S. as three- and four-speed record players replaced the individual 45 players. One indication of the decline of the 45 rpm EP is that the last Columbia Records reissue of Frank Sinatra songs on 45 rpm EP records, called Frank Sinatra (Columbia B-2641) was issued on 7 December 1959.

The Seeburg Corporation introduced the Seeburg Background Music System in 1959, using a 16 2/3 rpm 9-inch (230 mm) record with 2-inch (51 mm) center hole. Each record held 40 minutes of music per side, recorded at 420 grooves per inch.

From the mid-1950s through the 1960s, in the U.S. the common home record player or "stereo" (after the introduction of stereo recording) would typically have had these features: a three- or four-speed player (78, 45, 33 1/3, and sometimes 16 2/3 rpm); with changer, a tall spindle that would hold several records and automatically drop a new record on top of the previous one when it had finished playing, a combination cartridge with both 78 and microgroove styli and a way to flip between the two; and some kind of adapter for playing the 45s with their larger center hole. The adapter could be a small solid circle that fit onto the bottom of the spindle (meaning only one 45 could be played at a time) or a larger adapter that fit over the entire spindle, permitting a stack of 45s to be played.

RCA Victor 45s were also adapted to the smaller spindle of an LP player with a plastic snap-in insert known as a 45 rpm adapter. These inserts were commissioned by RCA president David Sarnoff and were invented by Thomas Hutchison.

Capacitance Electronic Discs were videodiscs invented by RCA, based on mechanically tracked ultra-microgrooves (9541 grooves per inch) on a 12-inch (300 mm) conductive vinyl disc.

=== High fidelity ===
The term "high fidelity" was coined in the 1920s by some manufacturers of radio receivers and phonographs to differentiate their better-sounding products claimed as providing "perfect" sound reproduction. The term began to be used by some audio engineers and consumers through the 1930s and 1940s. After 1949 a variety of improvements in recording and playback technologies, especially stereo recordings, which became widely available in 1958, gave a boost to the "hi-fi" classification of products, leading to sales of individual components for the home such as amplifiers, loudspeakers, phonographs, and tape players. High Fidelity and Audio were two magazines that hi-fi consumers and engineers could read for reviews of playback equipment and recordings.

=== Stereophonic sound ===
Decoding the left channel

A stereophonic phonograph provides two channels of audio, one left and one right. This is achieved by adding another vertical dimension of movement to the needle in addition to the horizontal one. As a result, the needle now moves not only left and right, but also up and down. But since those two dimensions do not have the same sensitivity to vibration, the difference needs to be evened out by having each channel take half its information from each direction by turning the channels 45 degrees from horizontal.

As a result of the 45-degree turn and some vector addition, it can be demonstrated that out of the new horizontal and vertical directions, one would represent the sum of the two channels, and the other representing the difference. Record makers decide to pick the directions such that the traditional horizontal direction codes for the sum. As a result, an ordinary mono disk is decoded correctly as "no difference between channels", and an ordinary mono player would simply play the sum of a stereophonic record without too much loss of information.

In 1957 the first commercial stereo two-channel records were issued first by Audio Fidelity followed by a translucent blue vinyl on Bel Canto Records, the first of which was a multi-colored-vinyl sampler featuring A Stereo Tour of Los Angeles narrated by Jack Wagner on one side, and a collection of tracks from various Bel Canto albums on the back.

=== Noise reduction systems ===
A similar scheme aiming at the high-end audiophile market, and achieving a noise reduction of about 20 to 25 dB(A), was the Telefunken/Nakamichi High-Com II noise reduction system being adapted to vinyl in 1979. A decoder was commercially available but only one demo record is known to have been produced in this format.

Other noise-reduction systems for vinyl records were dbx and CX.

Yet another noise reduction system for vinyl records was the UC compander system developed by Zentrum Wissenschaft und Technik (ZWT) of Kombinat Rundfunk und Fernsehen (RFT). The system deliberately reduced disk noise by 10 to 12 dB(A) only to remain virtually free of recognizable acoustical artifacts even when records were played back without an UC expander. In fact, the system was undocumented yet introduced into the market by several East German record labels since 1983. Over 500 UC-encoded titles were produced without an expander becoming available to the public. The only UC expander was built into a turntable manufactured by Phonotechnik Pirna/Zittau.

The availability of encoded disks in any of these formats stopped in the mid-1980s.

== Formats ==
=== Types of records ===
The usual diameters of the holes on an EP record are 0.286 inches (7.26 mm).

Sizes of records in the United States and the UK are generally measured in inches, e.g. 7-inch records, which are generally 45 rpm records. LPs were 10-inch records at first, but soon the 12-inch size became by far the most common. Generally, 78s were 10-inch, but 12-inch and 7-inch and even smaller were made—the so-called "little wonders".

=== Standard formats ===
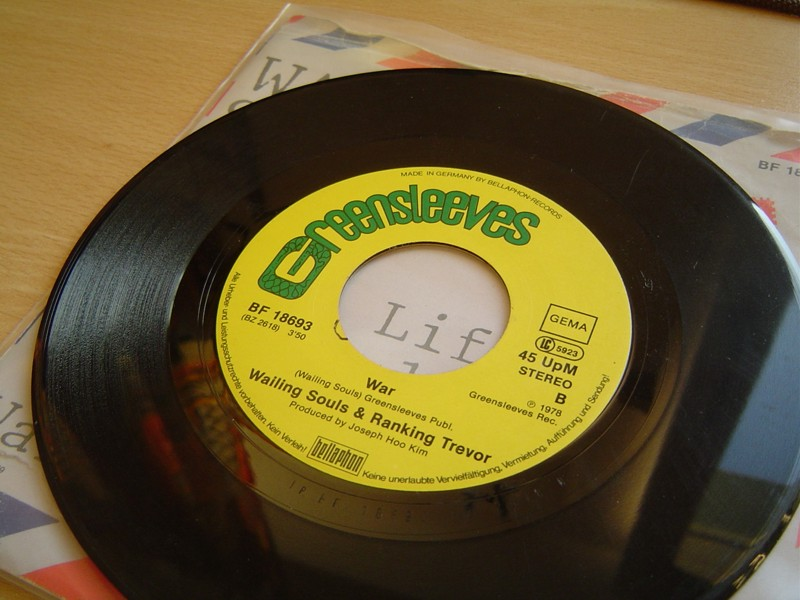
A standard wide-hole 7-inch vinyl record from 1978 on its sleeve

Diameter	Finished Diameter (Note: Original hole diameters were ±0.286 in (7.3 mm) ±0.001 in (0.025 mm) for 33 1/3 and 78.26 rpm records, and 0.504 in (12.8 mm) ˜±0.002 in (0.051 mm) for 45 rpm records.)	Name	Revolutions per minute	Approximate duration (minutes) per side
16 in (410 mm)	15 15/16″ ±3/32″	Transcription disc	33 1/3	15
12 in (300 mm)	11 7/8″ ±1/32″	LP (Long Play)	33 1/3	22
12 in (300 mm)	11 7/8″ ±1/32″	Maxi Single, 12-inch single	45	15
12 in (300 mm)	11 7/8″ ±1/32″	Single	78	4–5
10 in (250 mm)	9 7/8″ ±1/32″	LP (Long Play)	33 1/3	12–15
10 in (250 mm)	9 7/8″ ±1/32″	EP (Extended Play)	45	9–12
10 in (250 mm)	9 7/8″ ±1/32″	Single	78	3
7 in (180 mm)	6 7/8″ ±1/32″	EP (Extended Play)	33 1/3 (Note: Columbia pressed many 7-inch 33 1/3 rpm vinyl singles in 1949, but they were dropped in early 1950 due to the popularity of the RCA Victor 45.)	7
7 in (180 mm)	6 7/8″ ±1/32″	EP (Extended Play)	45	8
7 in (180 mm)	6 7/8″ ±1/32″	Single	45	5 1/3

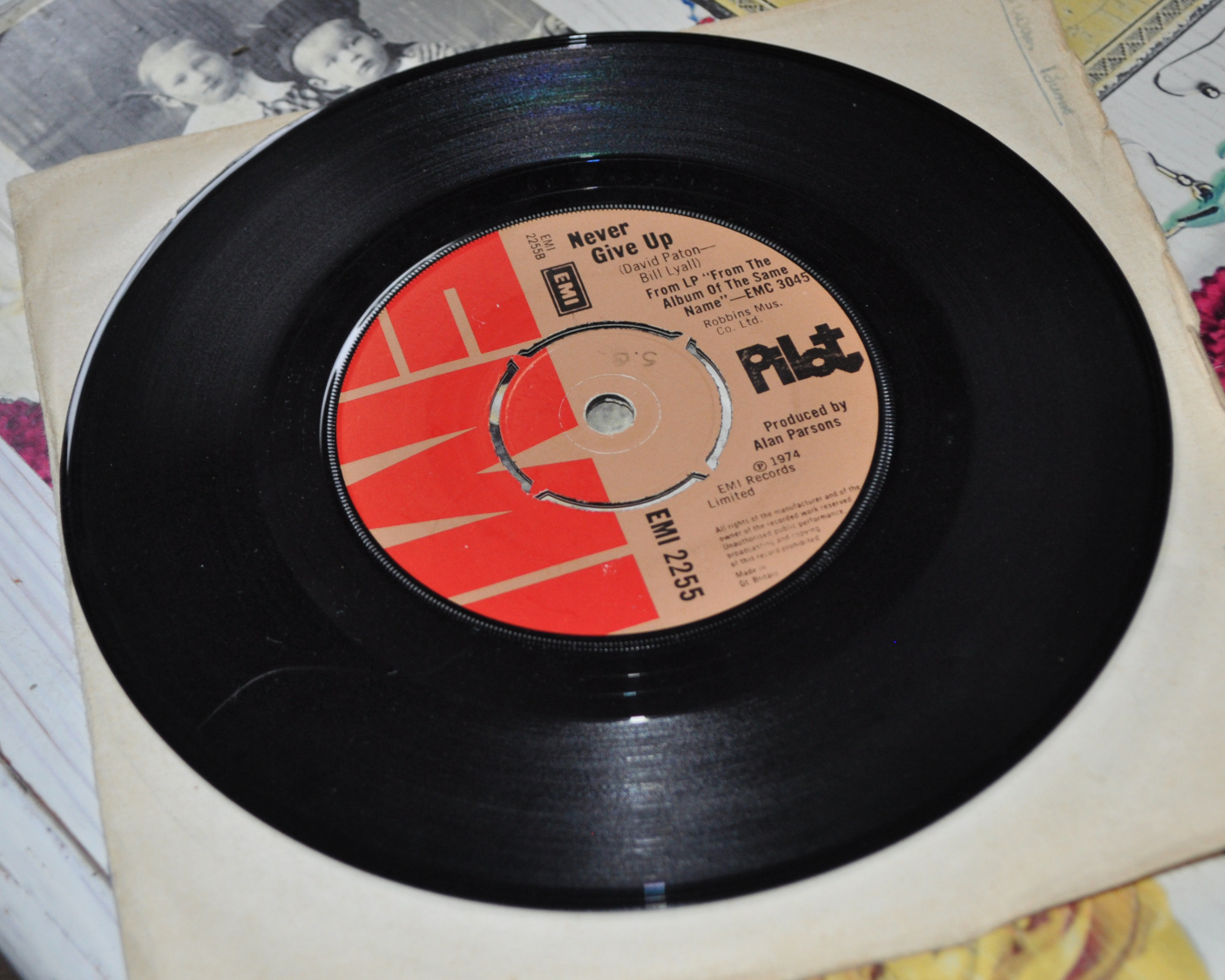
Example of 7″ EMI single with notched center hole

=== Less common formats ===
Flexi discs were thin flexible records that were distributed with magazines and as promotional gifts from the 1960s to the 1980s.

In March 1949, as RCA Victor released the 45, Columbia released several hundred 7-inch, 33 1/3 rpm, small-spindle-hole singles. This format was soon dropped as it became clear that the RCA Victor 45 was the single of choice and the Columbia 12-inch LP would be the album of choice. The first release of the 45 came in seven colors, based on the genre/type of music featured on the record: black 47-xxxx popular series, yellow 47-xxxx juvenile series, green (teal) 48-xxxx country series, deep red 49-xxxx classical series, bright red (cerise) 50-xxxx blues/spiritual series, light blue 51-xxxx international series, dark blue 52-xxxx light classics. Most colors were soon dropped in favor of black because of production problems. However, yellow and deep red were continued until about 1952. The first 45 rpm record created for sale was "PeeWee the Piccolo" RCA Victor 47-0147 pressed in yellow translucent vinyl at the Sherman Avenue plant, Indianapolis on 7 December 1948, by R. O. Price, plant manager.

In the 1950s and 1960s Ribs were created within Soviet Union countries as a result of cultural censorship. These black market records were of banned music, printed onto x-ray films scavenged from hospital bins.

In the 1970s, the government of Bhutan produced now-collectible postage stamps on playable vinyl mini-discs.

=== Recent developments ===
In 2018, an Austrian startup, Rebeat Innovation GmBH, received US$4.8 million in funding to develop high definition vinyl records that purport to contain longer play times, louder volumes and higher fidelity than conventional vinyl LPs. Rebeat Innovation, headed by CEO Günter Loibl, has called the format 'HD Vinyl'. The HD process works by converting audio to a digital 3D topography map that is then inscribed onto the vinyl stamper via lasers, resulting in less loss of information. Many critics have expressed skepticism regarding the cost and quality of HD records.

In May 2019, at the Making Vinyl conference in Berlin, Loibl unveiled the software "Perfect Groove" for creating 3D topographic audio data files. The software provides a map for laser engraving for HD Vinyl stampers. The audio engineering software was created with mastering engineers Scott Hull and Darcy Proper, a four-time Grammy winner. The demonstration offered the first simulations of what HD Vinyl records are likely to sound like, ahead of actual HD vinyl physical record production. Loibl discussed the software "Perfect Groove" at a presentation titled "Vinyl 4.0 The next generation of making records" before offering demonstrations to attendees.

In 2025, Tiny Vinyl of Nashville, Tennessee began a partnership with Target to sell 4-inch (100 mm) vinyl records, which were cheaper than full-size records. However, former AC Entertainment executive Jesse Mann, who partnered with toy industry executive Neil Kohler, admitted the audio quality was not the same. The records had been produced for several years by Nashville's GZ Media.

== Structure ==
Comparison of several forms of disk storage showing tracks (tracks not to scale); green denotes start and red denotes end. * Some CD-R(W) and DVD-R(W)/DVD+R(W) recorders operate in ZCLV, CAA or CAV modes.

Increasingly from the early 20th century, and almost exclusively since the 1920s, both sides of the record have been used to carry the grooves. Occasional records have been issued since then with a recording on only one side.

In the 1980s, Columbia records briefly issued a series of less expensive one-sided 45 rpm singles.

Since its inception in 1948, vinyl record standards for the United States follow the guidelines of the Recording Industry Association of America (RIAA).

=== Vinyl weight ===
The stability of a vinyl record being played can be significantly affected by the relative weight of the material. Full-size 12-inch (30 cm) 33 rpm LP records can weigh anywhere from 80 to 200 grams, depending on the material and its thickness, with a weight of around 180 grams usually considered ideal. The preferred weight for 7-inch (18 cm) 45 rpm singles is 50 grams.

For lighter records, record clamps or record weights can be used to help hold the record down on the turntable. A record clamp is actually screwed down for a positive lock, whereas a record weight is a puck that simply sits on top of the center of the record.

=== Vinyl quality ===
The composition of vinyl used to press records (a blend of polyvinyl chloride and polyvinyl acetate) has varied considerably over the years. Virgin vinyl is preferred, but during the 1970s energy crisis, as a cost-cutting move, much of the industry began reducing the thickness and quality of vinyl used in mass-market manufacturing. Sound quality suffered, with increased ticks, pops, and other surface noises. RCA Records marketed their lightweight LP as Dynaflex, which, at the time, was considered inferior by many record collectors.

It became commonplace to use recycled vinyl. New or "virgin" heavy/heavyweight (180–220 g) vinyl is commonly used for modern audiophile vinyl releases in all genres. Many collectors prefer to have heavyweight vinyl albums, which have been reported to have better sound than normal vinyl because of their higher tolerance against deformation caused by normal play.

Following the vinyl revival of the 21st century, select manufacturers adopted bioplastic-based records due to concerns over the environmental impact of widespread PVC use.

== Limitations ==
=== Shellac ===
One problematic aspect of shellac was that the size of the disks tended to be larger because they were limited to 80–100 grooves per inch (3.1–3.9 grooves /mm) due to the risk of groove collapse at greater densities, whereas vinyl could have up to 260 grooves per inch (10 grooves /mm) and maintain the stability of the medium.

=== Vinyl ===
Although vinyl records are strong and do not break easily, vinyl is soft and scratches can ruin the record. It readily acquires a static charge, attracting dust that is difficult to remove completely. Dust and scratches cause clicks and pops on audio playback. In extreme cases, they can cause the needle to skip over a series of grooves, or cause the needle to skip backward, creating a "locked groove" that repeats over and over. This is the origin of the phrase "like a broken record" or "like a scratched record", which describes a person or thing that repeats itself.

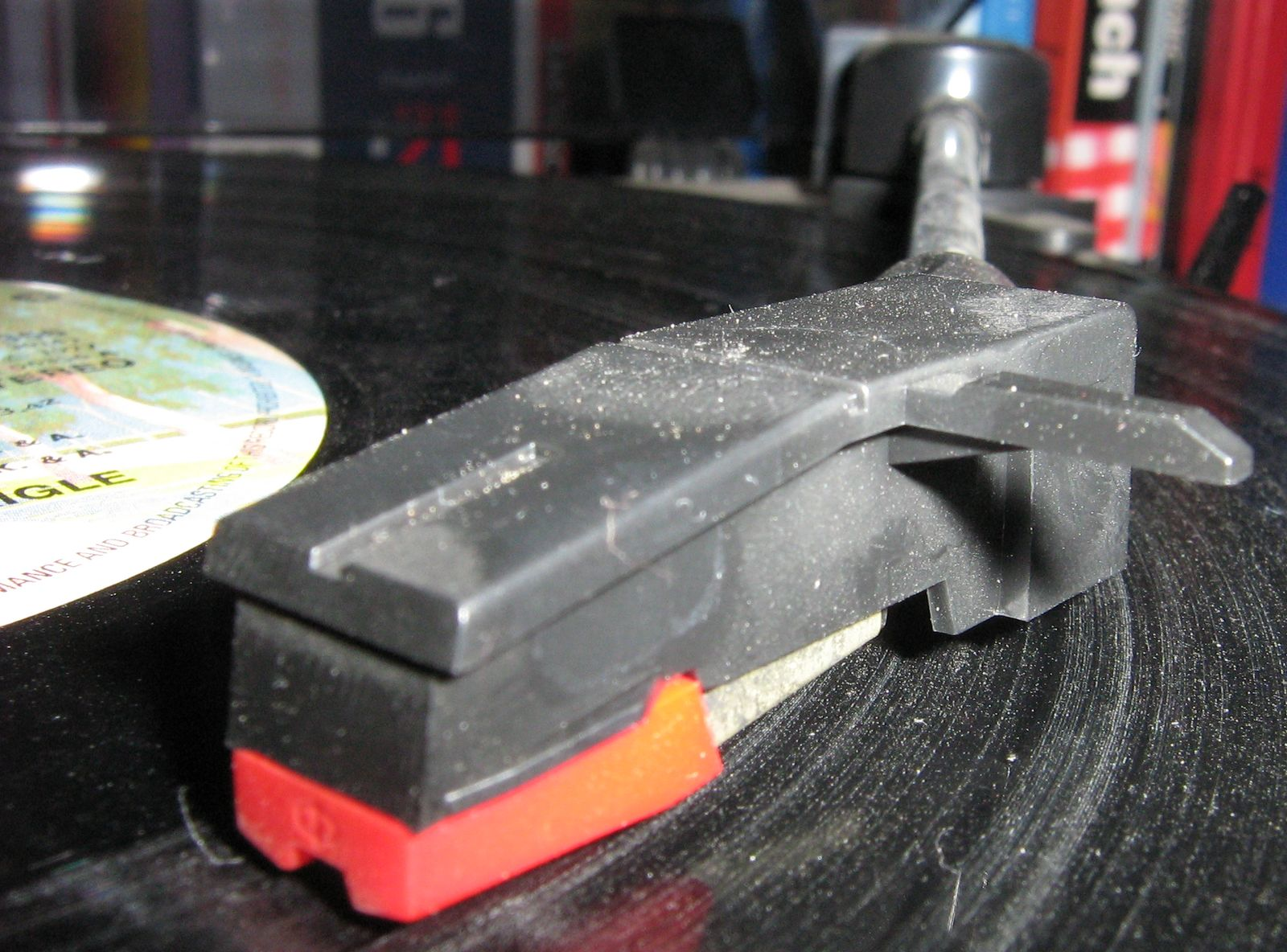
A dusty/scratched vinyl record being played. The dust settles into the grooves.

A further limitation of the gramophone record is that fidelity declines as playback progresses: there is more vinyl per second available for fine reproduction of high frequencies at the large-diameter beginning of the groove than exist at the smaller diameters close to the end of the side. At the start of a groove on an LP, 510 mm of vinyl per second travels past the stylus; at the end of the groove, it is 200–210 mm per second – less than half the linear resolution.

There is controversy about the relative quality of CD sound and LP sound when the latter is heard under the best conditions (see Comparison of analog and digital recording). One technical advantage with vinyl is that if correctly handled and stored, it can be playable for decades and possibly centuries, which is longer than some versions of the optical CD. For vinyl records to be playable for years to come, they need to be handled with care and stored properly. Guidelines for proper vinyl storage include not stacking records on top of each other, avoiding heat or direct sunlight, and placing them in a temperature-controlled area to prevent warping. Collectors often store their records in a variety of boxes, cubes, shelves and racks.

=== Sound fidelity ===
At the time of the introduction of the compact disc (CD) in 1982, the stereo LP pressed in vinyl continued to suffer from a variety of limitations:

The stereo image was not made up of fully discrete left and right channels; each channel's signal coming out of the cartridge contained a small amount of the signal from the other channel, with more crosstalk at higher frequencies. High-quality disc cutting equipment was capable of making a master disc with 30–40 dB of stereo separation at 1,000 Hz, but the playback cartridges had lesser performance of about 20 to 30 dB of separation at 1000 Hz, with separation decreasing as frequency increased, such that at 12 kHz the separation was about 10–15 dB. A common modern view is that stereo isolation must be higher than this to achieve a proper stereo soundstage. However, in the 1950s the BBC determined in a series of tests that only 20–25 dB is required for the impression of full stereo separation.

Thin, closely spaced spiral grooves that allow for increased playing time on a 33 1/3 rpm microgroove LP lead to a tinny pre-echo warning of upcoming loud sounds. The cutting stylus unavoidably transfers some of the subsequent groove wall's impulse signal into the previous groove wall. It is discernible by some listeners throughout certain recordings, but a quiet passage followed by a loud sound allows anyone to hear a faint pre-echo of the loud sound occurring 1.8 seconds ahead of time.

=== LP vs. CD ===
Audiophiles have differed over the relative merits of the LP versus the CD since the digital disc was introduced. Digital sampling can theoretically completely reproduce a sound wave within a given range of frequencies if the sampling rate is high enough. Vinyl's drawbacks, however, include surface noise, less resolution due to a lower dynamic range, and greater sensitivity to handling. Modern anti-aliasing filters and oversampling systems used in digital recordings have eliminated perceived problems observed with early CD players.

There is a theory that vinyl records can audibly represent higher frequencies than compact discs, though most of this is noise and not relevant to human hearing. According to Red Book specifications, the compact disc has a frequency response of 20 Hz up to 22,050 Hz, and most CD players measure flat within a fraction of a decibel from at least 0 Hz to 20 kHz at full output. Due to the distance required between grooves, it is not possible for an LP to reproduce as low frequencies as a CD. Additionally, turntable rumble and acoustic feedback obscures the low-end limit of vinyl but the upper end can be, with some cartridges, reasonably flat within a few decibels to 30 kHz, with gentle roll-off. Carrier signals of Quad LPs popular in the 1970s were at 30 kHz to be out of the range of human hearing. The average human auditory system is sensitive to frequencies from 20 Hz to a maximum of around 20,000 Hz. The upper and lower frequency limits of human hearing vary per person. High frequency sensitivity decreases as a person ages, a process called presbycusis.

== Preservation ==
Gramophone records are gradually degraded by each playback, and are best preserved by transferring the recording onto other media and playing the records as rarely as possible. They need to be stored on edge, and do best under environmental conditions that most humans would find comfortable. The longevity and optimal performance of vinyl records can be improved through certain accessories and cleaning supplies. Slipmats provide a soft and cushioned surface between the record and the turntable platter, minimizing friction and damage to the vinyl surface.

Where old disc recordings are considered to be of artistic or historic interest, from before the era of tape or where no tape master exists, archivists play back the disc on suitable equipment and record the result, typically onto a digital format, which can be manipulated to remove analog flaws without any further damage to the source recording. For example, Nimbus Records uses a specially built horn record player to transfer 78s. For accurate transfer, professional archivists carefully choose the correct stylus shape and diameter, tracking weight, equalisation curve and other playback parameters and use high-quality analogue-to-digital converters.

As an alternative to playback with a stylus, a record can be read optically, processed with software to calculate an equivalent stylus velocity, and thereby converted to a digital format. This technique sometimes allows for reconstruction of broken or otherwise damaged discs.

== Popularity and current status ==
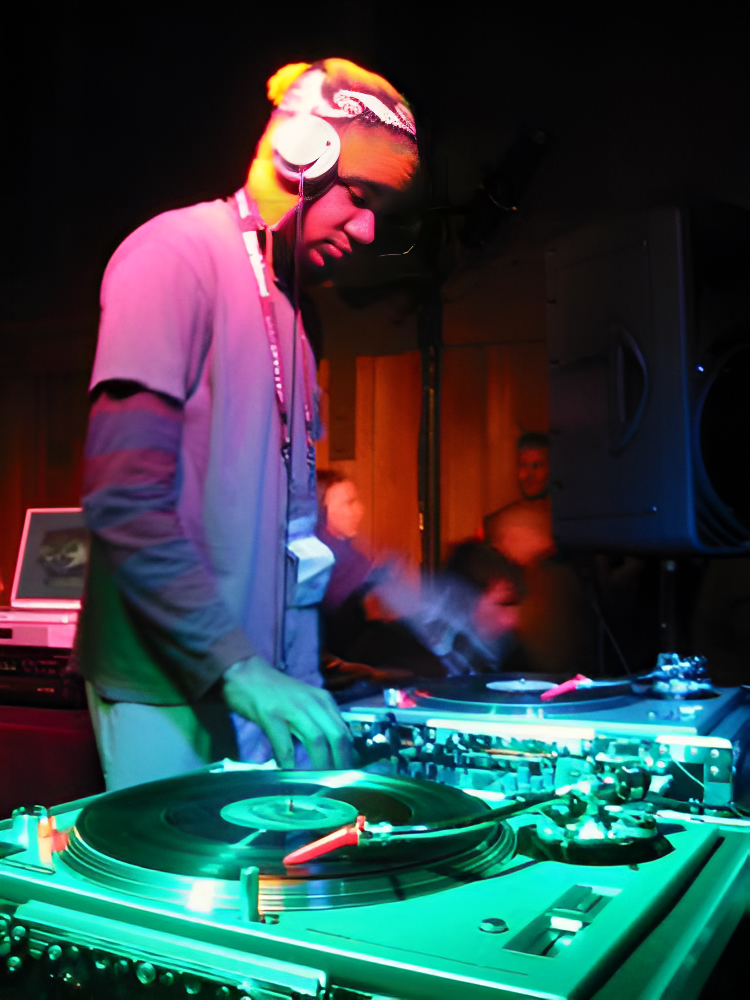
A DJ mixing vinyl records with a DJ mixer at the Sundance Film Festival in 2003

Groove recordings, first designed in the final quarter of the 19th century, held a predominant position for nearly a century—withstanding competition from reel-to-reel tape, the 8-track cartridge, and the compact cassette. The widespread popularity of Sony's Walkman was a factor that contributed to the vinyl's lessening usage in the 1980s.

In 1988, the compact disc surpassed the gramophone record in unit sales. Vinyl records experienced a sudden decline in popularity between 1988 and 1991, when the major label distributors restricted their return policies, which retailers had been relying on to maintain and swap out stocks of relatively unpopular titles. First the distributors began charging retailers more for new products if they returned unsold vinyl, and then they stopped providing any credit at all for returns. Retailers, fearing they would be stuck with anything they ordered, only ordered proven, popular titles that they knew would sell, and devoted more shelf space to CDs and cassettes. Record companies also removed many vinyl titles from production and distribution, further undermining the availability of the format and leading to the closure of pressing plants. This rapid decline in the availability of records accelerated the format's decline in popularity, and is seen by some as a deliberate ploy to make consumers switch to CDs, which unlike today, were more profitable for the record companies.

The more modern CD format held numerous advantages over the record such as its portability, digital audio and its elimination of background hiss and surface noise, instant switching and searching of tracks, longer playing time, lack of continuous degradation (most analog formats wear out as they get played), programmability (e.g. shuffle, repeat), and ability to be played on and copied to a personal computer. In spite of their flaws, records continued to have enthusiastic supporters, partly due to a preference of its "warmer" sound and its larger sleeve artwork. Records continued to be format of choice by disc jockeys in dance clubs during the 1990s and 2000s due to its better mixing capabilities.

=== Revival era ===
A niche resurgence of vinyl records began in the late 2000s, mainly among rock fans. The Entertainment Retailers Association in the United Kingdom found in 2011 that consumers were willing to pay on average £16.30 (€19.37, US$25.81) for a single vinyl record, as opposed to £7.82 (€9.30, US$12.38) for a CD and £6.80 (€8.09, US$10.76) for a digital download. The resurgence accelerated throughout the 2010s, and in 2015 reached $416 million revenue in the US, their highest level since 1988. As of 2017, it comprised 14% of all physical album sales. According to the RIAA's midyear report in 2020, phonograph record revenues surpassed those of CDs for the first time since the 1980s.

In 2021, Taylor Swift sold 102,000 copies of her ninth studio album Evermore on vinyl in one week. The sales of the record beat the largest sales in one week on vinyl since Nielsen started tracking vinyl sales in 1991. The sales record was previously held by Jack White, who sold 40,000 copies of his second solo release, Lazaretto, on vinyl in its first week of release in 2014.

Approximately 180 million LP records are produced annually at global pressing plants, as of 2021.

=== Present production ===
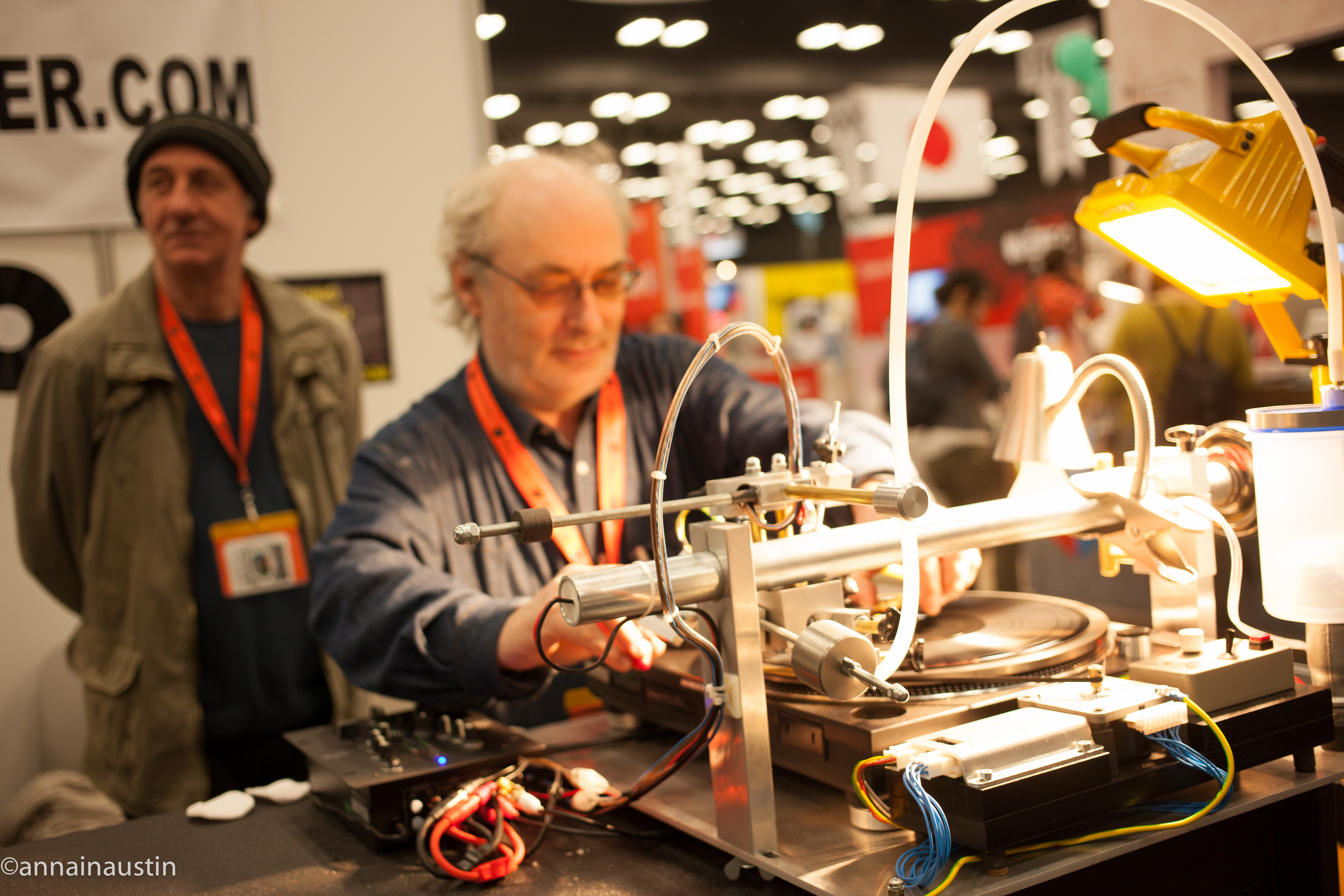
Vinyl record making demonstration at SXSW 2014

As of 2017, 48 record pressing facilities exist worldwide. The increased popularity of the record has led to the investment in new and modern record-pressing machines. Only two producers of lacquer master discs remained: Apollo Masters in California, and MDC in Japan. According to the Apollo Masters website, as of 2015 their future was still uncertain. Hand Drawn Pressing opened in 2016 as the world's first fully automated record pressing plant.

== Less common recording formats ==
=== VinylVideo ===
VinylVideo is a format to store a low resolution black and white video on a vinyl record alongside encoded audio.

=== Capacitance Electronic Disc ===
Another example is the Capacitance Electronic Disc, a color video format, with slightly higher video quality than VHS.

== See also ==
- Album cover
- Apollo Masters Corporation fire
- Conservation and restoration of vinyl discs
- The New Face of Vinyl: Youth's Digital Devolution (photo documentary)
- Pocket Disc
- Sound recording and reproduction
