= Acetate disc =

Type of phonograph record

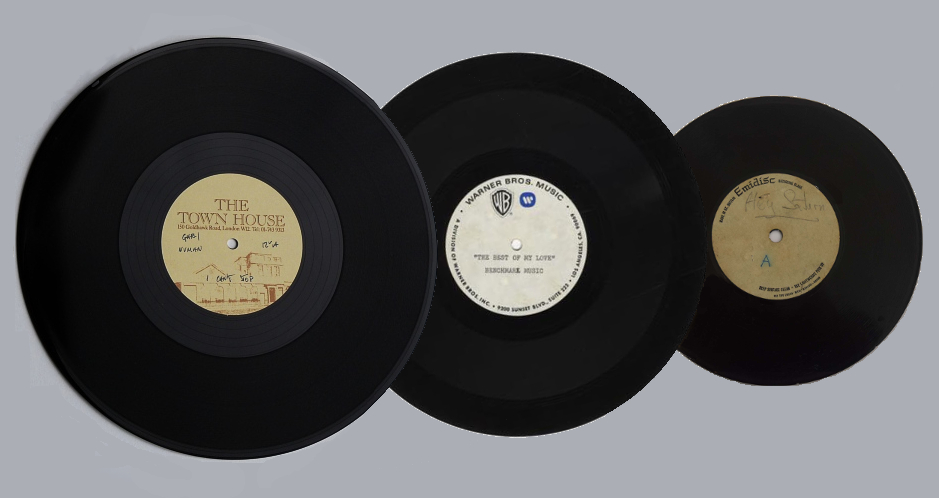
Acetates of 12", 10", 7" sizes

An acetate disc (also known as a lacquer, test acetate, dubplate, or transcription disc) is a type of phonograph record generally used from the 1930s to the late 1950s for recording and broadcast purposes.

Lacquer-coated discs are used for the production of records. Unlike ordinary vinyl records, which are quickly formed from lumps of plastic by a mass-production molding process, a lacquer master or acetate (instantaneous record) is created by using a recording lathe to cut an audio-signal-modulated groove into its surface – a sequential operation requiring expensive, delicate equipment and expert skill for good results.

In addition to their use in the creation of masters, lacquers were widely used for many purposes before magnetic tape recorders became common, and in the modern era they are used by dance music DJs. They were used in radio broadcasting to archive live broadcasts, pre-record local programming, delay network feeds for broadcast at a later time, and provide programming "from home" on the Armed Forces Radio Network. They were used extensively in Jamaica by sound system operators in the late 1940s and 1950s. Acetates were often used as "demos" of new recordings by artists and record labels. Some acetates are highly prized for their rarity, especially when they contain unpublished material.

== Physical characteristics ==
Despite their name, modern "acetate" discs do not contain any acetate. They consist of an aluminum disc with a coating of nitrocellulose lacquer with acetone added to make a varnish. Glass was often used for the substrate during World War II, when aluminum was in short supply. The production process results in a disc that is different in several ways from the vinyl records sold to customers at retail. Most noticeably, vinyl records are comparatively lightweight and flexible, while lacquers are rigid and considerably heavier because of their metal cores.

Lacquers commonly come in three sizes: 10-inch (25 cm) discs for singles and 14-inch (36 cm) discs for albums as well as 12-inch (30 cm) discs for LP references and for 10" master cuts. The record's sleeve is typically nothing more than a generic cover from the manufacturing company and the disc's label is similarly plain, containing only basic information about the content (title, artist, playing time, and so on), which is usually typed but may be hand-written.

Although once produced in a wide range of sizes (from less than 7 inches (18 cm) to more than 16 inches (41 cm) in diameter) and sometimes with glass core discs, the examples most commonly encountered today are 10, 12 or 14 inches (25, 30 or 36 cm) in diameter.

Blank discs were traditionally produced in several different grades, with the best and costliest grade featuring the sturdiest core, the thickest coating and the most perfectly flawless mirror-like surfaces. These top-quality blanks were intended for cutting the master discs that, once silver-coated, would be electrodeposited with nickel in order to electroform parts used in making stampers (negative profile metal moulds) for pressing ordinary records. Lower-quality blanks were considered adequate for non-critical uses such as tests and demo discs. Lower-grade blanks were formerly made for home use by amateurs and may be very thin and flexible, may have a cardboard rather than a metal or glass base, and may have noticeably dull or slightly orange-peel-textured surfaces.

In addition to the usual central spindle hole, there is traditionally at least one drive hole in the label area, meant to be engaged by a special pin that prevents the disc from slipping on the turntable during the recording process if the lathe does not have a vacuum turntable. Drive holes are often hidden by labels applied after the recording was cut, but they can usually be detected by careful inspection of the label or by holding the disc up to a light bright enough to penetrate the labels. Drive holes are no longer standard on lacquer masters, only on "dubs", because the additional holes can interfere with the electroforming process and professional mastering lathes use vacuum turntables that hold the workpiece (lacquer disc) in place with suction. One pump usually provides suction for both the turntable and the chip tube that pulls away the fine string of nitrocellulose lacquer removed by the groove-cutting stylus.

Acetate discs are made for special purposes, almost never for sale to the general public. They can be played on any normal record player but will suffer from wear more quickly than vinyl, since the lacquer does not have the same properties as that of vinyl.

== Production ==
Acetates are usually made by dubbing from a master recording in another medium, such as magnetic tape. In the vinyl record manufacturing process, a lacquer master disc is cut and electroforming is used to make negative metal molds from it; certain molds are converted into stampers, can be used to press thousands of vinyl copies of the master. Within the vinyl record industry, lacquers, sometimes called 'acetates' or 'refs', are also used for evaluating the quality of the tape-to-disc transfer. They were once a favored medium for comparing different takes or mixes of a recording, and if pressed vinyl copies of an impending new release were not yet available, acetates were used for getting preview copies into the hands of important radio disc jockeys.

Acetates were produced in very small quantities using elementary cutting machines. The majority of discs found on the market were not labelled or marked, as distributing studios would only at most have their name and address written on the disc. It was generally up to the recipients to write the song title or name of the artist onto the disc by hand.

On February 6, 2020, news broke of a fire at the Apollo Masters manufacturing plant in Banning, California. The plant produces Lacquer discs used in vinyl production with the fire completely destroying the manufacturing facility. The manufacturing facility is one of only two in the world, the other being Public Record (the lacquers of which are labeled MDC – the name of their principal distributor, based in Japan). This led to industry experts fearing that the vinyl production supply chain would be put under stress with heavy demand and only one factory worldwide.

== Uses ==
Lacquers were generally used from the 1930s to the late 1950s for recording and broadcast purposes and see limited use as of 2009. Lacquers have not always been used solely as a means of evaluating a tape-to-disc transfer or cutting the final master disc. They were used for many purposes before magnetic tape recorders became common, and in the modern era they are used by dance music DJs. They were used extensively in Jamaica by sound system operators in the late 1940s and 1950s. Acetates were often used as "demos" of new recordings by artists and record labels.

=== Disc mastering ===
In preparation for a record pressing, acetates are used for quality control prior to the production of the stampers, from which retail copies of the record will be pressed. The purpose of the test acetate(s) (called, 'reference disks') in the mastering process is to allow the artist, producer, engineer, and other interested parties to check the quality of the tape-to-disc recording process and make any necessary changes to ensure that the audio fidelity of the master disc will be as close as possible to that of the original master tape. The actual stamper sets can be made either from oversized lacquers or from DMM blanks (see Direct Metal Mastering).

=== Direct recording ===
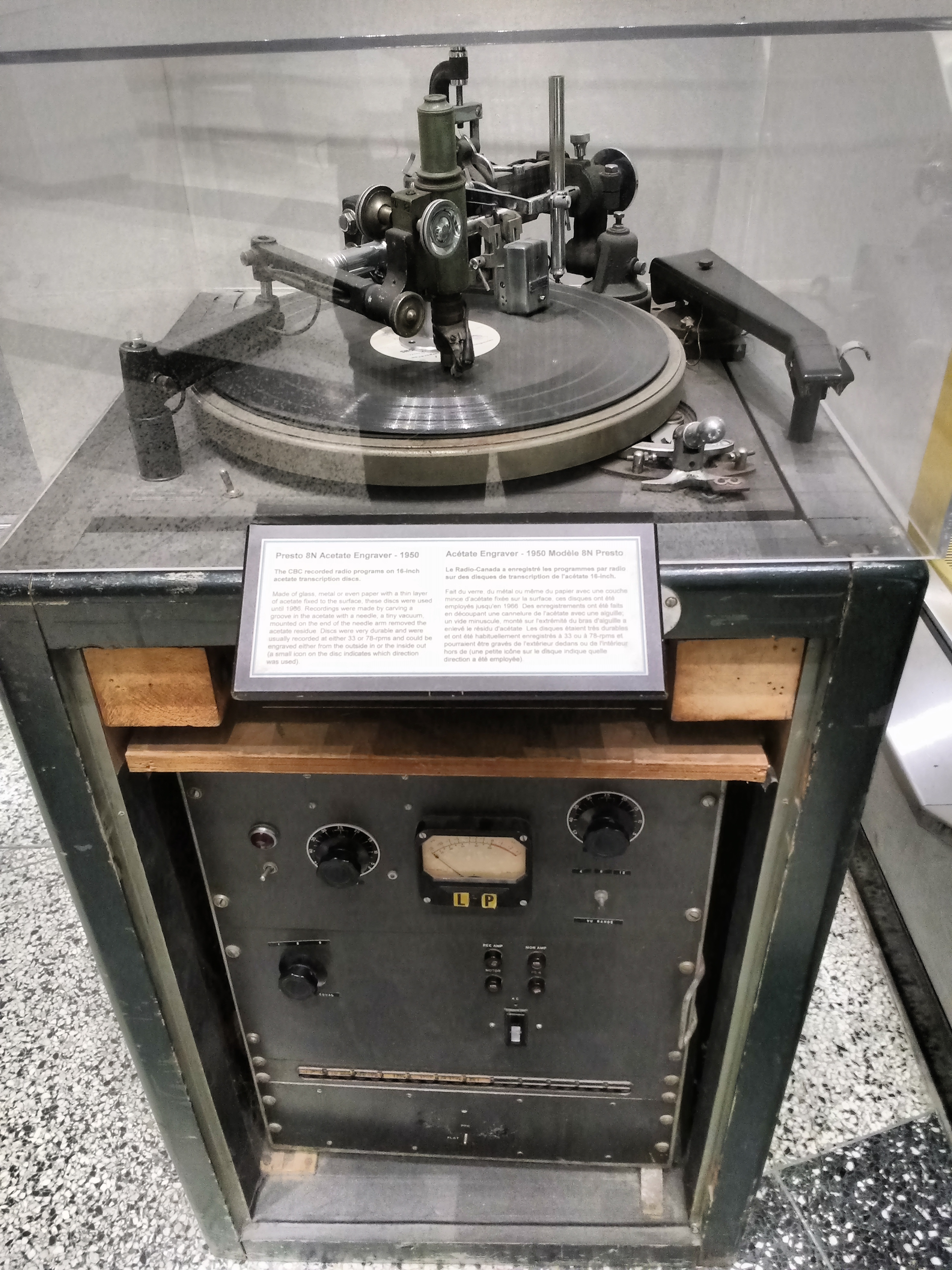
Presto 8N Acetate disc engraver (1950) used by the Canadian Broadcasting Corporation to record radio programs

Before the introduction of magnetic tape for mastering, disc recording was done "live" (see direct to disc recording), although sometimes intermediate disc-to-disc editing procedures were involved. Before lacquer discs were adopted for the purpose, the master recording was cut into a disc of wax-like material that was too soft to be played non-destructively and had to be used as a mandrel on which to electroform a metal stamper, which was in turn used to make playable pressings. Acetate blanks allowed high-quality playable records to be produced "instantaneously".

Acetates were used in radio broadcasting to archive live broadcasts, pre-record local programming, delay network feeds for broadcast at a later time, and provide programming "from home" on the Armed Forces Radio Network. (In many cases, the AFRN disc is the only form in which a classic radio show has survived.) 16-inch (41 cm) discs recorded at 33 1/3 rpm were used for these one-off "electrical transcriptions" beginning in the mid-1930s.

Disc recorders designed for amateur home use began appearing on the market around 1940, but their high prices limited sales, and then World War II brought their production to a halt. After the war, the popularity of such recorders greatly increased. It was not unusual for a carnival, circus, amusement park, or transit hub to offer disc recording in a booth for a modest fee. Countless discs were cut at parties and family gatherings, both for immediate amusement value and to preserve audio "snapshots" of these events and of the voices of relatives and friends. Schoolchildren and adults alike used them to practice speeches, amateur musical efforts were immortalized, and snippets of radio broadcasts were captured, all limited by the three- or four-minute maximum playing time of the 78 rpm large-groove format which was still standard for all home-use records. The home recorders typically had two tone arms, one for recording and the other for playback, and a red light to indicate recording was taking place. One problem with the process was the "string" of cut material that followed the recording tone arm as the groove was cut. This "string" could interfere with the recording process and required manual intervention to remove.

This relatively bulky equipment, and the bulky discs, were hauled to remote locations such as Yugoslavia (see Milman Parry) or the Mississippi Delta (see Archive of American Folk Song) by ethnographers, linguists, and musical researchers. Substantial collections of these recordings are available to researchers at academic and national libraries, as well as museums.

During the very early tape era, around 1950, acetate discs and portable disc recorders competed with magnetic tape as a location-recording medium, both for broadcast and semi-pro use, but tape's several advantages quickly won the contest. Recording services hired to record weddings and other private events routinely captured them on tape, but because most homes of the 1950s and early 1960s were not equipped to play tapes, while nearly everyone had a record player, typically the recording was dubbed to disc and supplied to the client in that form and the original tape was recycled. Acetate discs are inherently less durable than some types of magnetic tape, and have the disadvantage of not being physically editable; unlike tape, acetates cannot be cut and spliced.

=== Black and dance music ===
In the dance music world, DJs cut new or otherwise special tracks on acetates, in order to test crowd response and find potential hits. This practice started as early as in the 1960s in Jamaica, between soundsystems, as a way of competing and drawing bigger crowds. These discs are known as dubplates. Dubplates were used by reggae soundsystems worldwide, and later adopted by producers of various dance music genres, most notably drum and bass and dubstep. Trading dubplates between different DJs is an important part of DJ culture. Actual acetate dubplates are declining in popularity, and being increasingly replaced by CDs and vinyl emulation software for reasons of weight, durability and overall cost.

== Value ==
Due to their rarity, some acetates can command high prices at auction. Brian Epstein's collection of Beatles acetates fetched between $1,000 and $10,000 per disc, with a rare one reaching £77,500 at auction. An acetate from The Velvet Underground, containing music that would later appear on their first album The Velvet Underground & Nico, sold in 2006 for $25,200. An acetate of Elvis Presley's "That's All Right" sold for $82,393.60 in 2013. The only known copy of Presley's first recording—a 78 rpm acetate from 1953 featuring "My Happiness" backed with "That's When Your Heartaches Begin"—sold for $300,000 at a Graceland auction in 2015.

== See also ==
- Direct metal mastering
- Ribs (recordings)
