= The New Face of Vinyl: Youth's Digital Devolution =

The New Face of Vinyl: Youth's Digital Devolution is a 2011 photo documentary project that explores the vinyl revival, a newfound interest in vinyl records by youth. The project was co-created by two Baldwin-Wallace College students Benjamin Meadors and Owen M. McCafferty II.

== Project summary ==
The New Face of Vinyl explores in detail the cultural and social impacts of the recent rise in popularity of vinyl records by young people, primarily aged 15 to 25.

The two project creators Ben and Owen are scheduled to travel to New York City, Cleveland, Chicago, Portland, and San Francisco to photograph young record collectors and record store owners and create a narrative within a photo-documentary book in order to record what they call a "digital devolution". However, the possibility of including Los Angeles and Nashville have been proposed by the two authors.

== Project history ==
According to a recent interview Ben Meadors, a Cleveland freelance photographer, was looking to expand his photographic portfolio by photographing young college students using their record players. After photographing writer and fellow Baldwin-Wallace College student Owen McCafferty, the two decided to create the project which would explore the newfound interest in vinyl and have it published in a book. The two created a project site on Kickstarter.com to collect funding which was fully funded on 31 July 2011.

== Current progress ==
Owen and Ben have announced that the project is set to visit New York City and Chicago sometime in December 2011.

== Authors ==
The project was first created by Cleveland freelance photographer Benjamin Meadors of Ben Meadors Photography. Meadors is currently an MBA student at Baldwin Wallace University in Berea, Ohio. His clients include Baldwin Wallace University and PlayhouseSquare in Cleveland, Ohio.

The co-creator, Owen M. McCafferty II is a freelance writer and studies Entrepreneurship, and English at Baldwin Wallace University. According to his personal website: "On a personal level, Mr. McCafferty enjoys many hobbies including stage managing at Cleveland theatres and collecting records....He is a self-confessed audiophile and an active gay rights supporter. Openly gay, Mr. McCafferty advocates his support of organizations like the Human Rights Campaign and the AIDS Taskforce of Greater Cleveland. After graduation from Baldwin Wallace University, Mr. McCafferty plans to pursue careers in New York City and London, UK."
