= Apollo Masters Corporation fire =

Fire of lacquer disc manufacturing plant

Apollo Masters Corp. Fire
- Date: February 6, 2020
- Duration: 3:00:00
- Venue: Apollo Masters Corporation
- Location: 101 W. Lincoln St. Banning, California, USA; 33.9221°N 116.8773°W
- Cause: Undetermined
- Outcome: Temporary closure of Apollo Masters
- Deaths: None
- Injuries: None

The Apollo Masters Corporation fire occurred on February 6, 2020, in Banning, California. Apollo Masters was the only U.S. based manufacturing plant for producing lacquer discs used in pressing vinyl records. The destruction of the plant caused a ripple effect throughout the vinyl record industry, as it left only one operating lacquer plant in the world.

== The fire ==
The fire began just before 8 a.m., setting off three fire alarms and five or six explosions from within the building. The cause of the fire is presently undetermined. The inferno required eighty-two firefighters to extinguish it, spanning a total of three hours. Despite this, Banning High School which was not too far from the incident was not evacuated, and no staff nor students were harmed. In addition, while the building suffered complete destruction, none of the employees were injured.

== Effect on record industry ==
Before the fire, Apollo Masters was one of two factories worldwide to manufacture lacquer discs to be shipped to vinyl mastering studios. There, the blank lacquer would be cut from the master tape or digital source recording to produce a master from which metal molds are produced, for use in pressing the vinyl records. With the destruction of Apollo Masters, producing lacquer discs fell solely to a small Japanese company, MDC (ja). This caused a significant strain on the industry, as Apollo Masters was responsible for 70-85% of lacquer production. As a result of the strain, orders became backlogged and delayed, with priority falling to countries with bigger volumes of orders, such as the United Kingdom and the United States. Rebuilding of the facility is uncertain, as it would require hazardous waste remediation and navigating California's environmental laws.

With a decrease in lacquer production, some vinyl pressing plants turned to alternate means of producing records, including direct metal mastering, a costly method of producing records with copper instead of lacquer.

The fire also brought together the vinyl industry community, resulting in the creation of Vinyl Record Manufacturers Association of North America (VRMA), devoted to strengthening the industry. Around fifty companies are involved with the association, working together to increase the amount of lacquer production plants and prevent a repeat of any event similar to the Apollo Masters fire.
