= Hogarth Roundabout =

Roundabout and road junction in England

Coordinates: 51°29′13″N 0°15′09″W

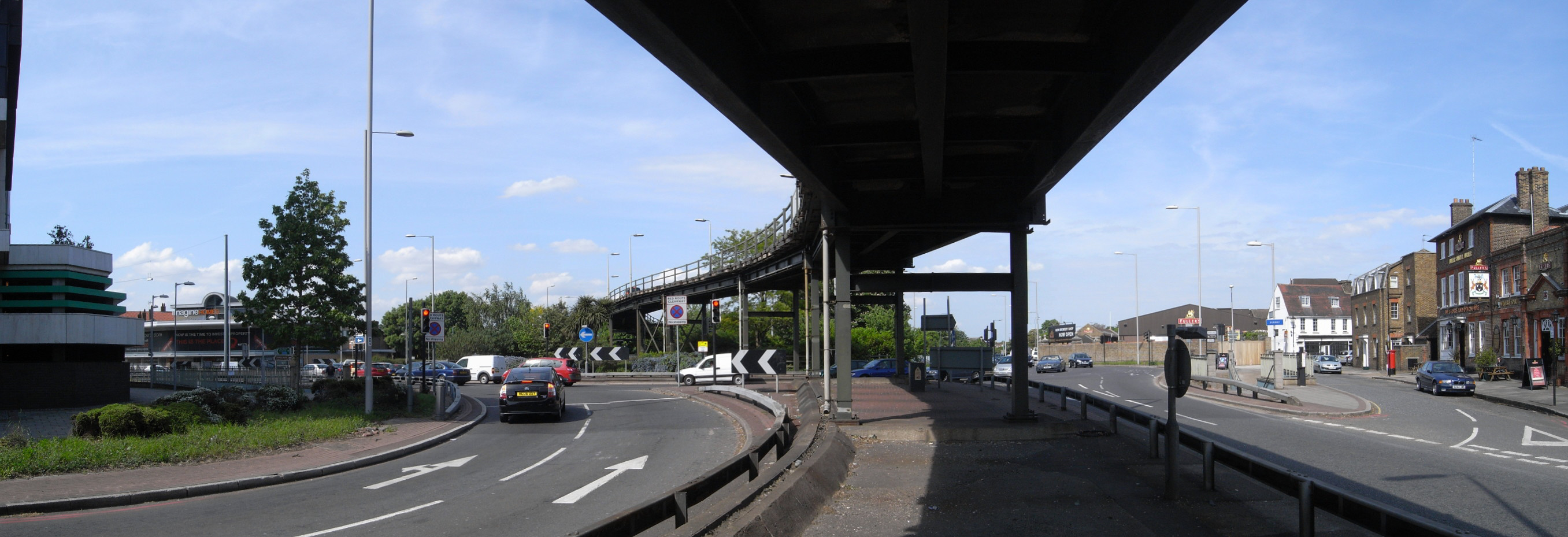
Hogarth Roundabout looking north from the A316

The Hogarth Roundabout is a major roundabout situated in Chiswick in west London. It connects the A4 Great West Road and the A316 Great Chertsey Road, two of the nine main radial roads to or from the city. (Note: The others are the A2, A20, A23, A3, A47 (for M1), A1, and A12 (for M11)) The final section of the A316 is Dorchester Grove (which becomes Chiswick Lane) to the north; the local road Church Street leads south to the conserved and affluent Old Chiswick riverside area.

The centre part of the roundabout is surfaced with grass and trees, and is crossed by a one-way flyover for eastbound traffic.

== Roundabout ==
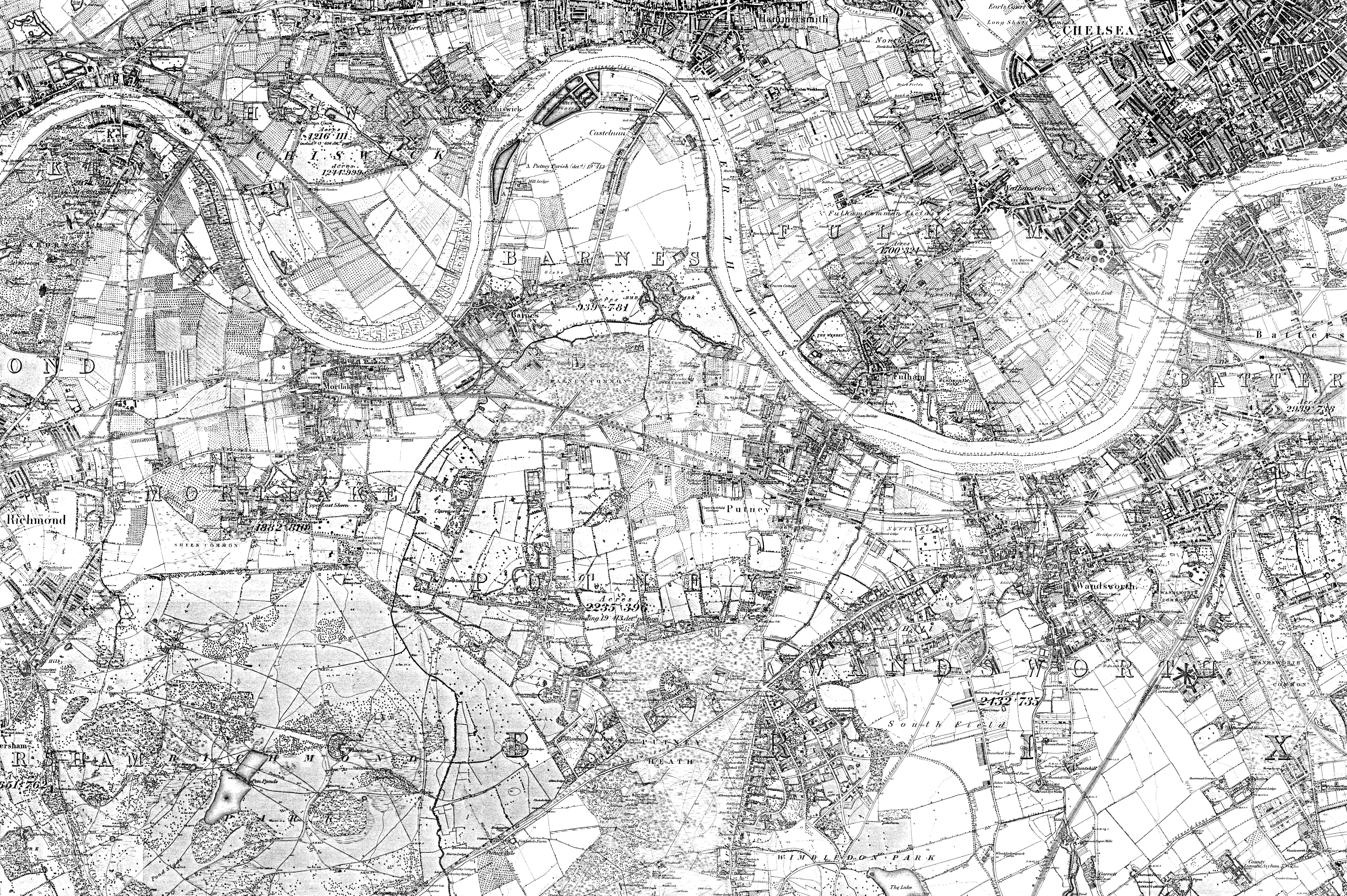
The site in about 1880. Click for broader map and to enable varied magnification. The roads leading east, southwest and west: much expanded since. The dots represent trees.

The roundabout is named after the eighteenth-century painter William Hogarth whose home Hogarth's House is behind a long high wall to the west of the junction. The eastern approach abuts the Griffin Brewery of Fuller, Smith and Turner where beer has been brewed since 1654. The south side has the 18th-century George and Devonshire pub. Another pub by the roundabout, the Mawson Arms on Chiswick Lane, was sold along with the brewery to Asahi in 2019.

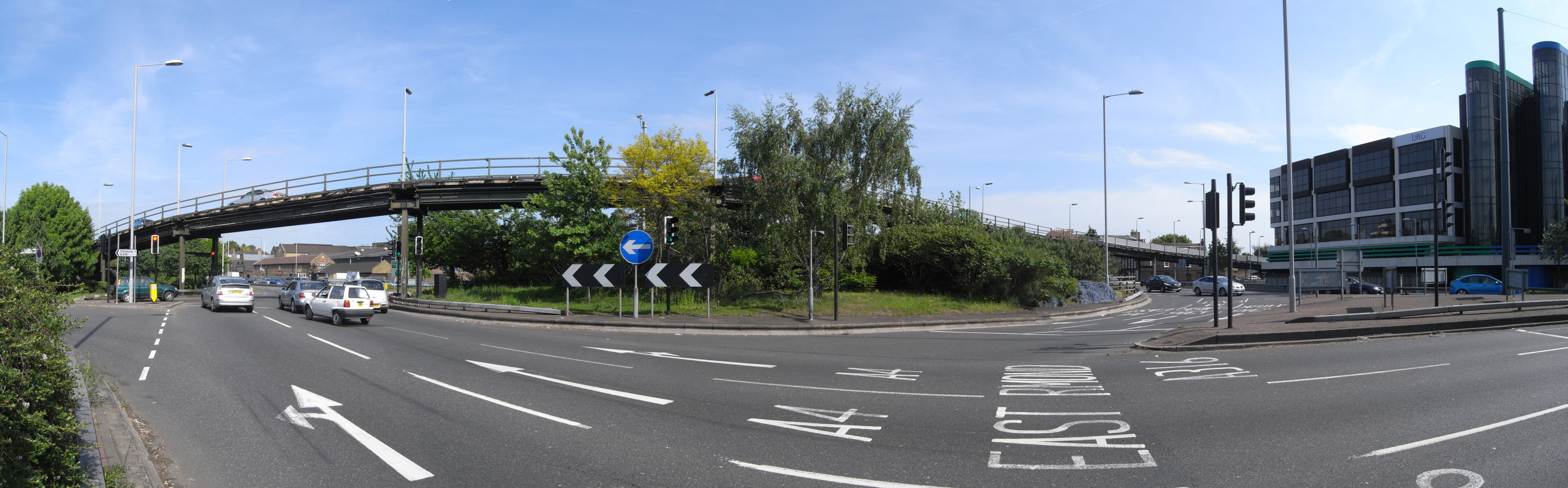
Hogarth Roundabout looking east and south

The junction is important for road transport as it lies on the only direct route to Heathrow Airport from the City and the West End.

== Flyover ==
The junction is noteworthy for the single-lane flyover to ease some eastbound traffic from the A316 onto the A4. It was built as a temporary measure in 1971, using the Bridgway format devised and offered to highway authorities by Marples Ridgeway Ltd.

The flyover was quickly put together with a cheap steel frame and was designed to last no more than a few years. The central span has pairs of diagonal cross-braces to give the structure strength and help protect it against strong winds. The junction was included in the plans for the London Ringways, which were shelved in the latter years of the 20th century. Had these been completed a more durable structure would have been put in place.

On 29 October 2013, after stormy winds the previous day, Transport for London inspectors discovered defects and closed the flyover, declaring it unsafe. Garrett Emmerson stated that its engineers identified a degradation in the concrete deck of the flyover. Traffic flow was therefore reduced, with peak time queues back to the Hammersmith flyover to the east and similarly to the west.

Following on from this closure a major refurbishment, incorporating a new deck, surface and parapets, allowed the flyover to reopen and confirmed its permanent status. The work was completed in September 2014, at a total cost of £3 million.

As of April 2024 vehicles using the flyover are limited to 2.0 metres (6.6 ft) width and 3.0 metric tons (3.0 long tons; 3.3 short tons) gross weight.
