= Old Chiswick =

Village in London

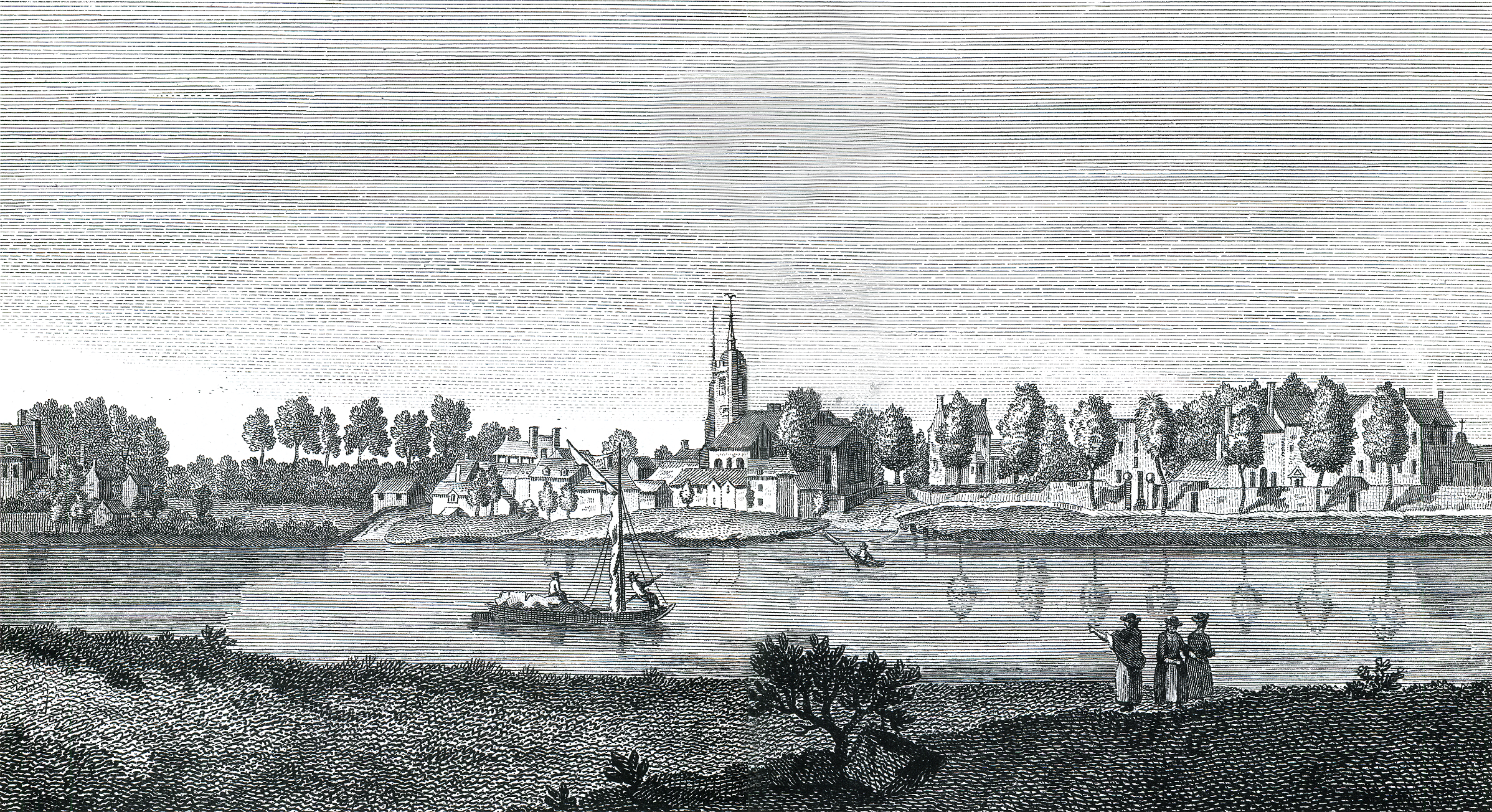
Chiswick from the river, in Walter Harrison's History of London, c. 1775

Old Chiswick is the area of the original village beside the river Thames for which the modern district of Chiswick is named. The village grew up around St Nicholas Church, founded c. 1181 and named for the patron saint of fishermen. The placename was first recorded c. 1000 as Ceswican ('Cheese farm'). In the Middle Ages the villagers lived by fishing, boatbuilding, and handling river traffic. The surrounding area was rural until the late 19th century.

The village's main street, Church Street, includes the half-timbered former Burlington Arms pub from the 15th century, and the former Lamb Tap pub. The old Post Office was once the home of Jean-Jacques Rousseau. The riverside street, Chiswick Mall, grew from humble beginnings to a row of grand houses, including Walpole House, from the 17th century onwards. The street still floods on high spring tides. Behind the riverfront is the Griffin Brewery, the only survivor of the five malthouses in Chiswick in 1736. Nearby is the 18th century Chiswick Square, the houses in brown brick with red dressings, and the Arts and Crafts Gothic St Mary's Convent.

The village was once the home of the Chiswick Press, where William Morris had some of his books printed. John I. Thornycroft & Company founded their shipyard at Church Wharf at the west end of Chiswick Mall in 1864, building the first naval destroyer, HMS Daring, there in 1893.

== Geography ==
Imagemap with clickable links. Infographic of Old Chiswick, based on c. 1880 Ordnance Survey map. "Chiswick New Town" has started to spread to the north.

Old Chiswick occupies a roughly rectangular area between the river Thames with Chiswick Mall running beside it to the southeast, Church Street to the southwest, Chiswick Lane South to the northeast, and Mawson Lane (now beside the Great West Road) to the northwest, while Chiswick Square is off Burlington Lane, to the west of Church Street. The small island of Chiswick Eyot lies off the downstream half of Chiswick Mall, a street that still floods on high spring tides.

Not far away to the west are Hogarth's House and Chiswick House and Gardens; they are not in the Old Chiswick Conservation Area. Of the other constituent medieval villages of modern Chiswick, Strand-on-the-Green lies to the west; Little Sutton and Turnham Green to the north. The area is in the London Borough of Hounslow; to the northeast is Hammersmith Mall; across the river is Barnes.

== History ==
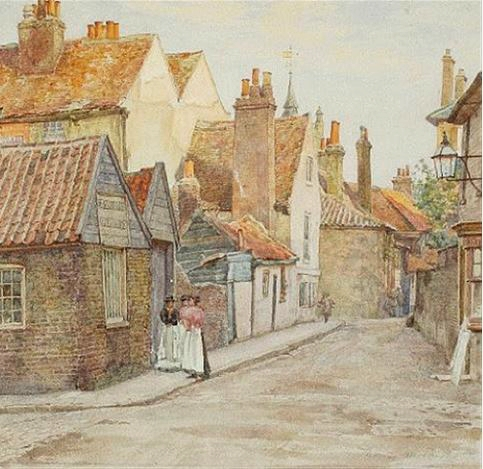
Watercolour A Vanished Corner of Old Chiswick, Thomas Matthews Rooke, 1896

The name "Chiswick" was first recorded c. 1000 as Ceswican, with the meaning from Old English of "cheese farm". Between 1600 and 1900 the area of the old village was known as "Chiswick town" or locally as "the town". By 1980 the usual name for the area was "Old Chiswick".

Old Chiswick was a definable place with a recorded population by 1590. The community lived beside and from the river; in 1458, the church was dedicated to Saint Nicholas, who was the patron saint of fishermen. The village had a ferry, and people made their living by fishing, boatbuilding, and handling river traffic. The risk of flooding from the tidal river kept the fields of the Chiswick peninsula free of housing until 1900.

=== St Nicholas Church ===
St Nicholas Church, Chiswick was founded c. 1181. Most of the current church dates from 1882 to 1884, when it was rebuilt to a design by the Gothic Revival architect John Loughborough Pearson, except for the surviving west tower, which was built for William Bordall (vicar 1416–1435). There are some fine 18th century wall-mounted monuments in the tower, and an exceptional one in the south chapel to Sir Thomas Chaloner, 1615. The alabaster sculpture portrays Chaloner, chamberlain to king James I; he and his wife are kneeling at a prayer desk under a curtained canopy, held open by men in boots.

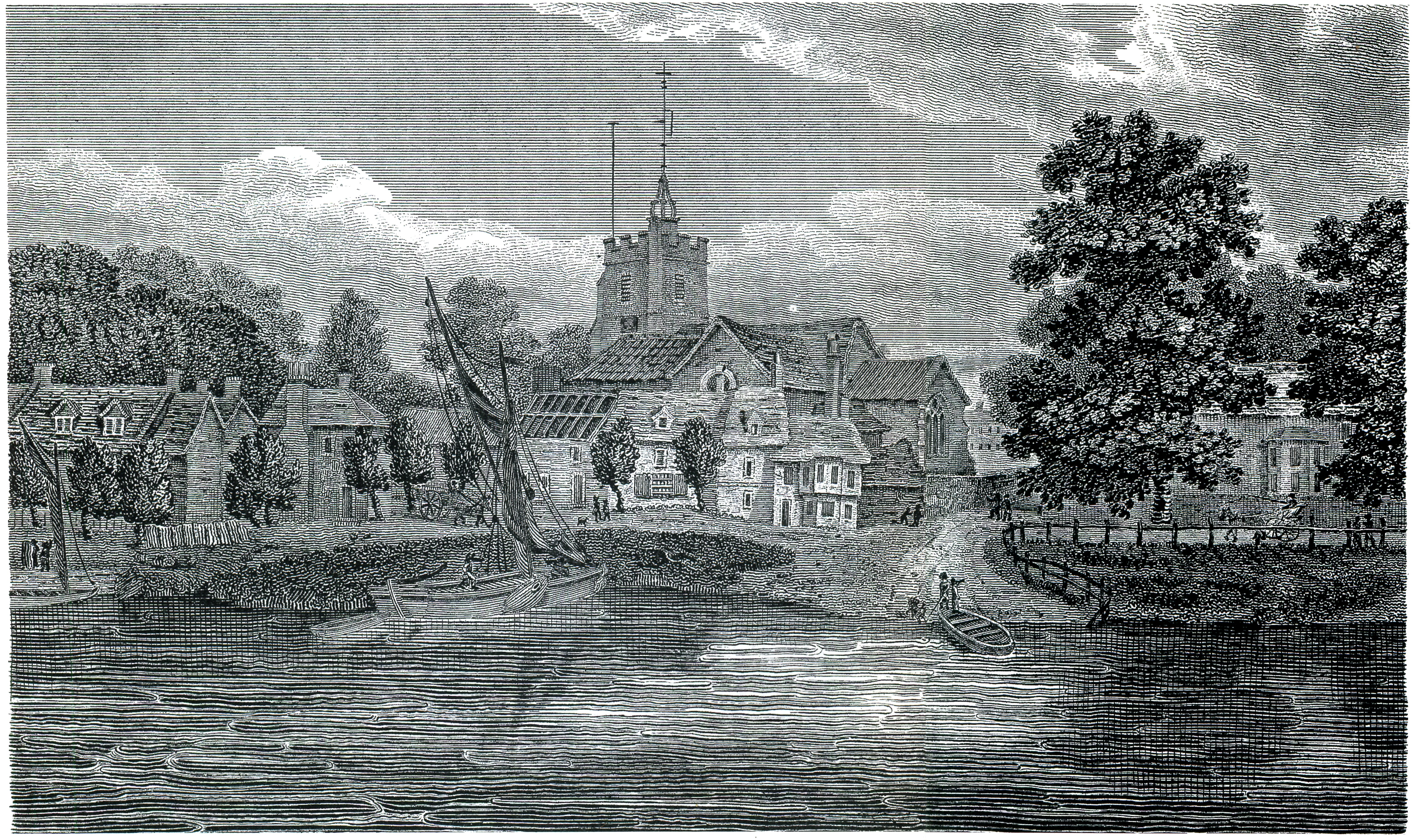
Engraving by Robert Blemmell after Jacob Schnebbelie, 1807, showing the church before its Victorian era rebuilding, and the fisherman's village, Slut's Hole, that stood below it

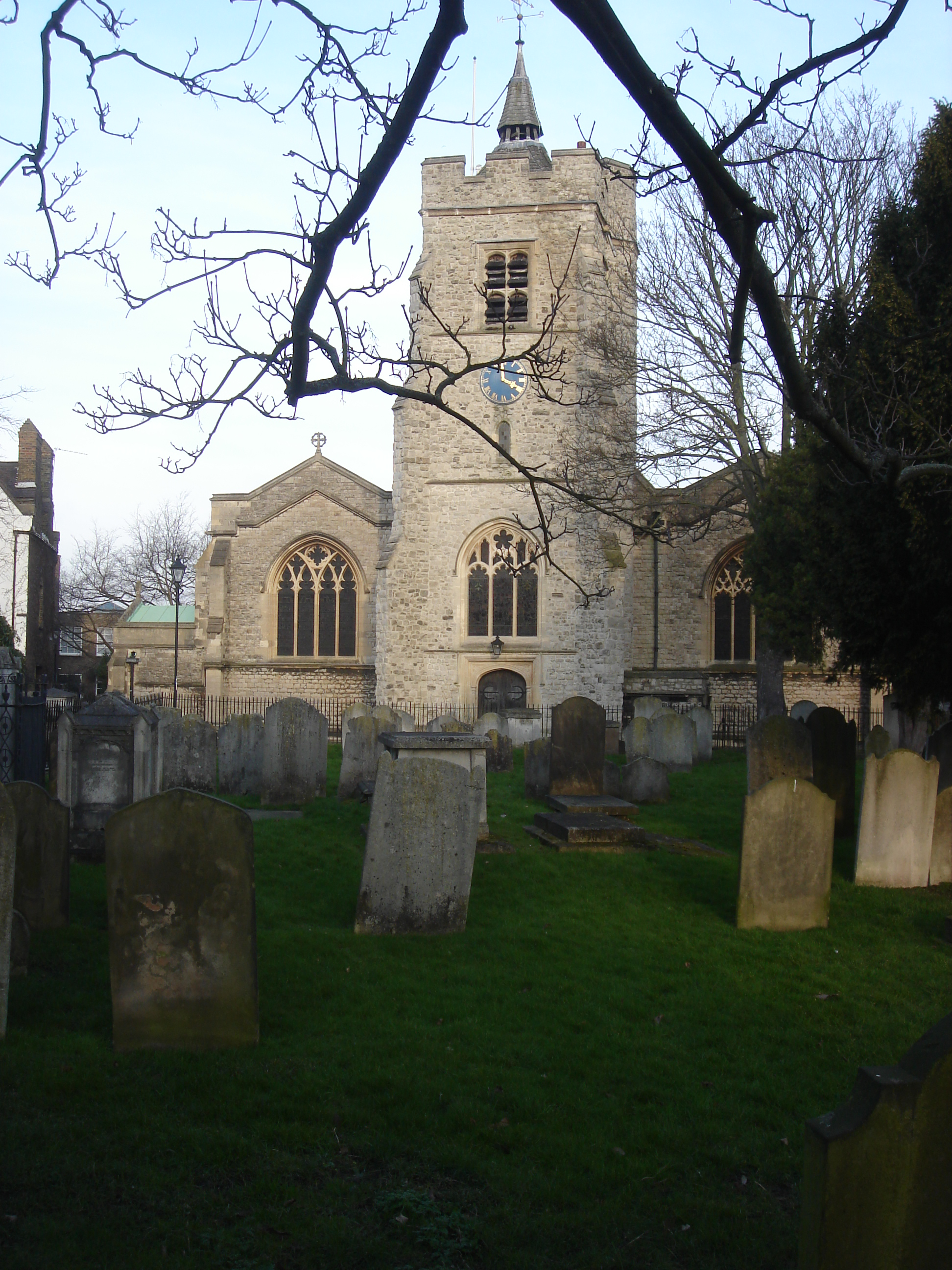
St Nicholas, Chiswick, rebuilt 1882–1884, with early 15th-century tower

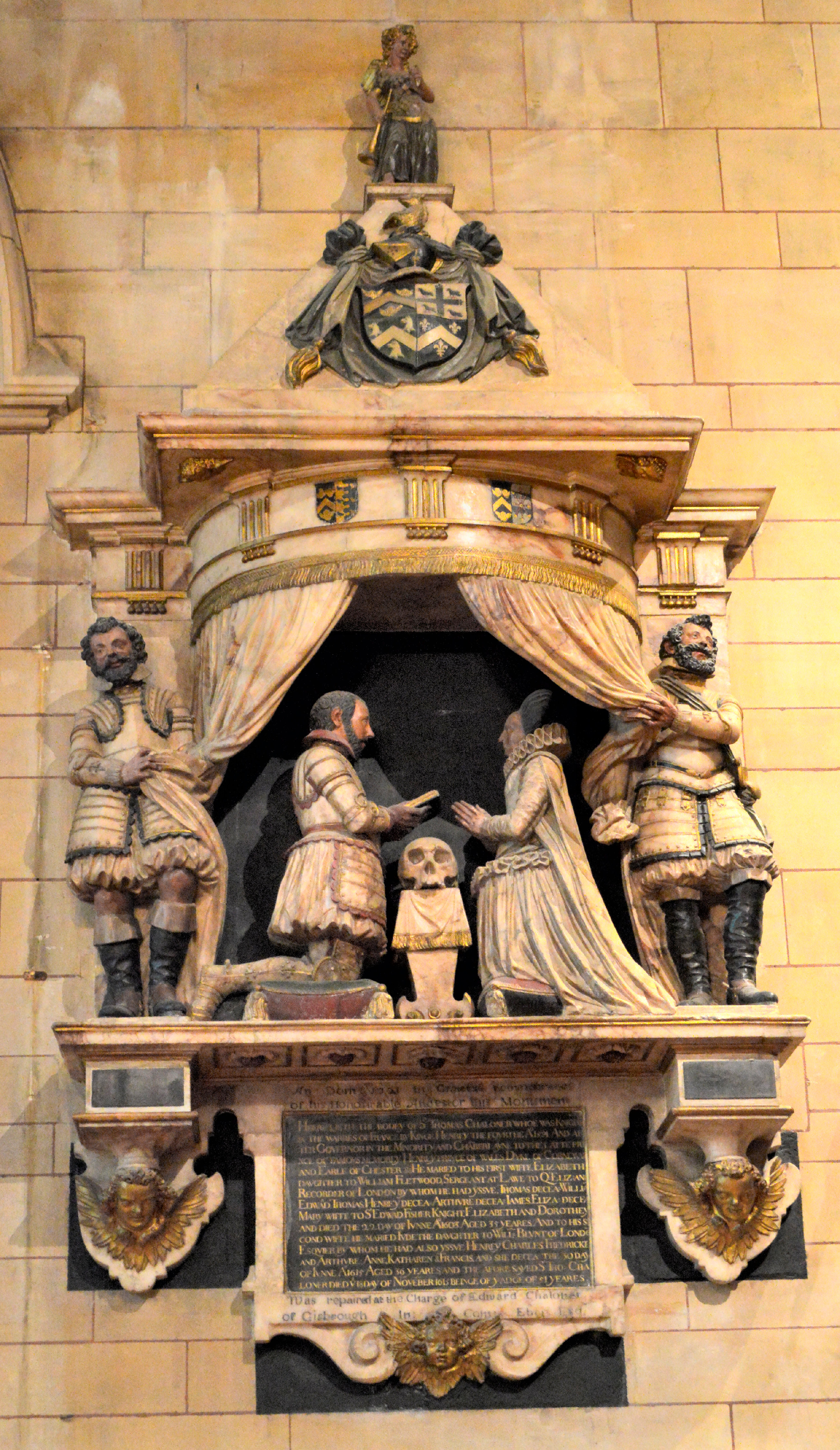
Monument of Sir Thomas Chaloner, 1615

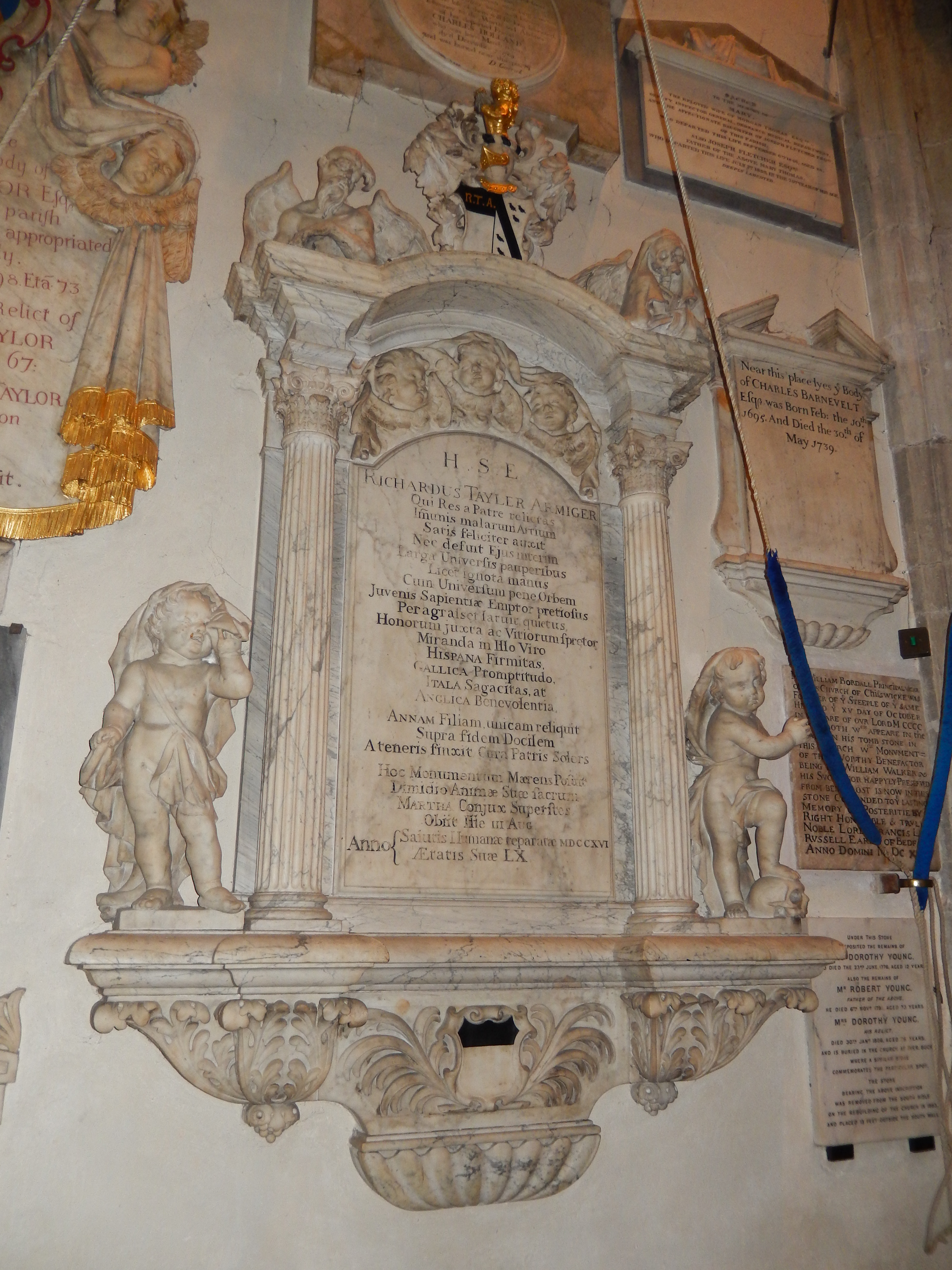
Richard Tayler memorial 1716, in the church tower

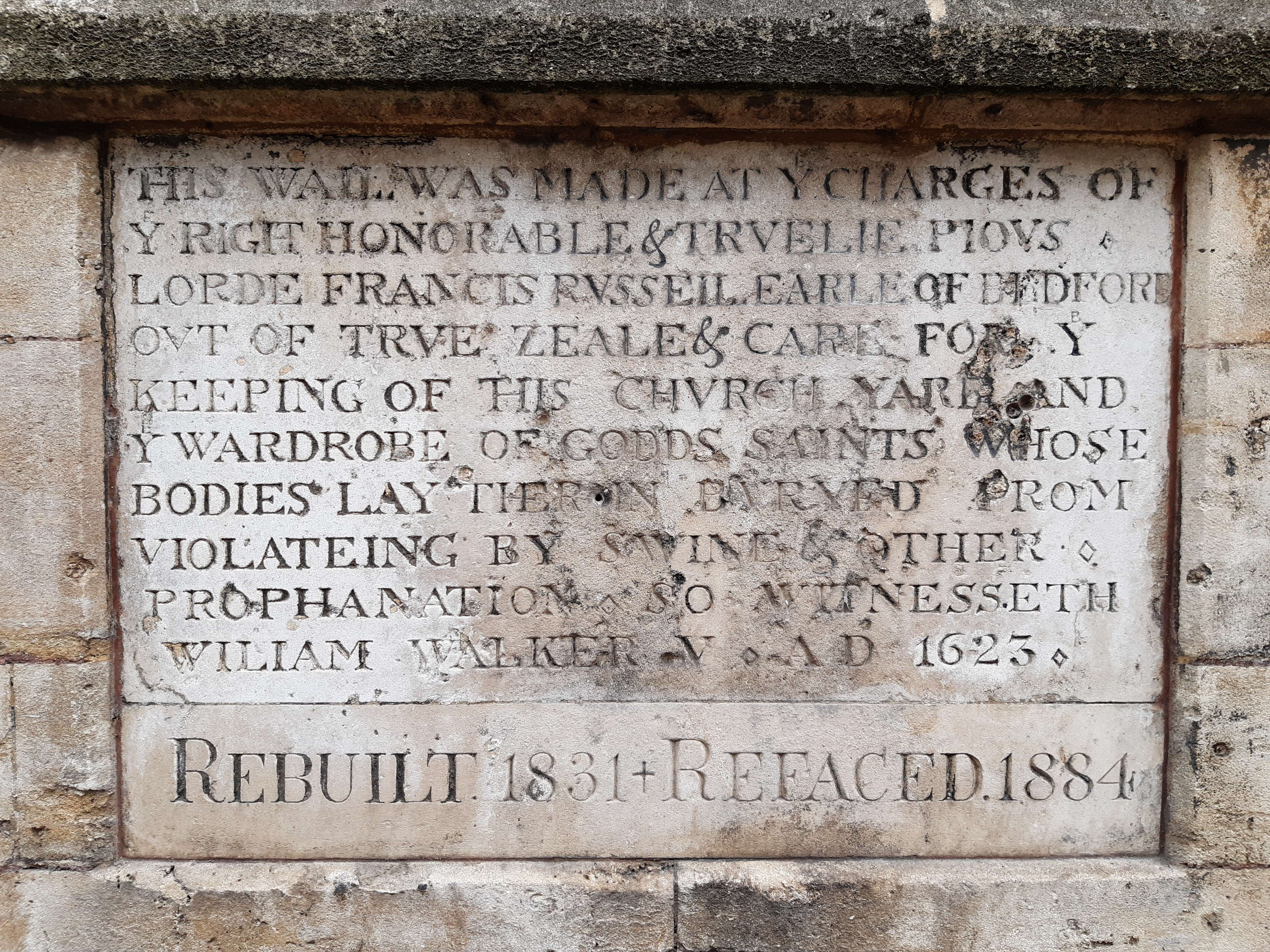
Stone recording St Nicholas Churchyard wall rebuilt 1623, 1831, 1884

=== Church Street ===
The village of Chiswick grew up around the church. Church Street runs northwest from the corner with Chiswick Mall, by the slipway down to the river, past the church which is on the west of the street, up to the junction with Burlington Lane and the Hogarth Roundabout. The oldest surviving secular building is the former Burlington Arms pub, a half-timbered 15th-century building, now a private house; it closed in 1924. The former Lamb Tap pub, closed in 1909, was just to its north. Leading off Church Street westwards is an "informally landscaped intimate cul-de-sac", Pages Yard, with four 2-storey Grade II cottages from the 17th century. The old Post Office was once home to the Enlightenment philosopher Jean-Jacques Rousseau.

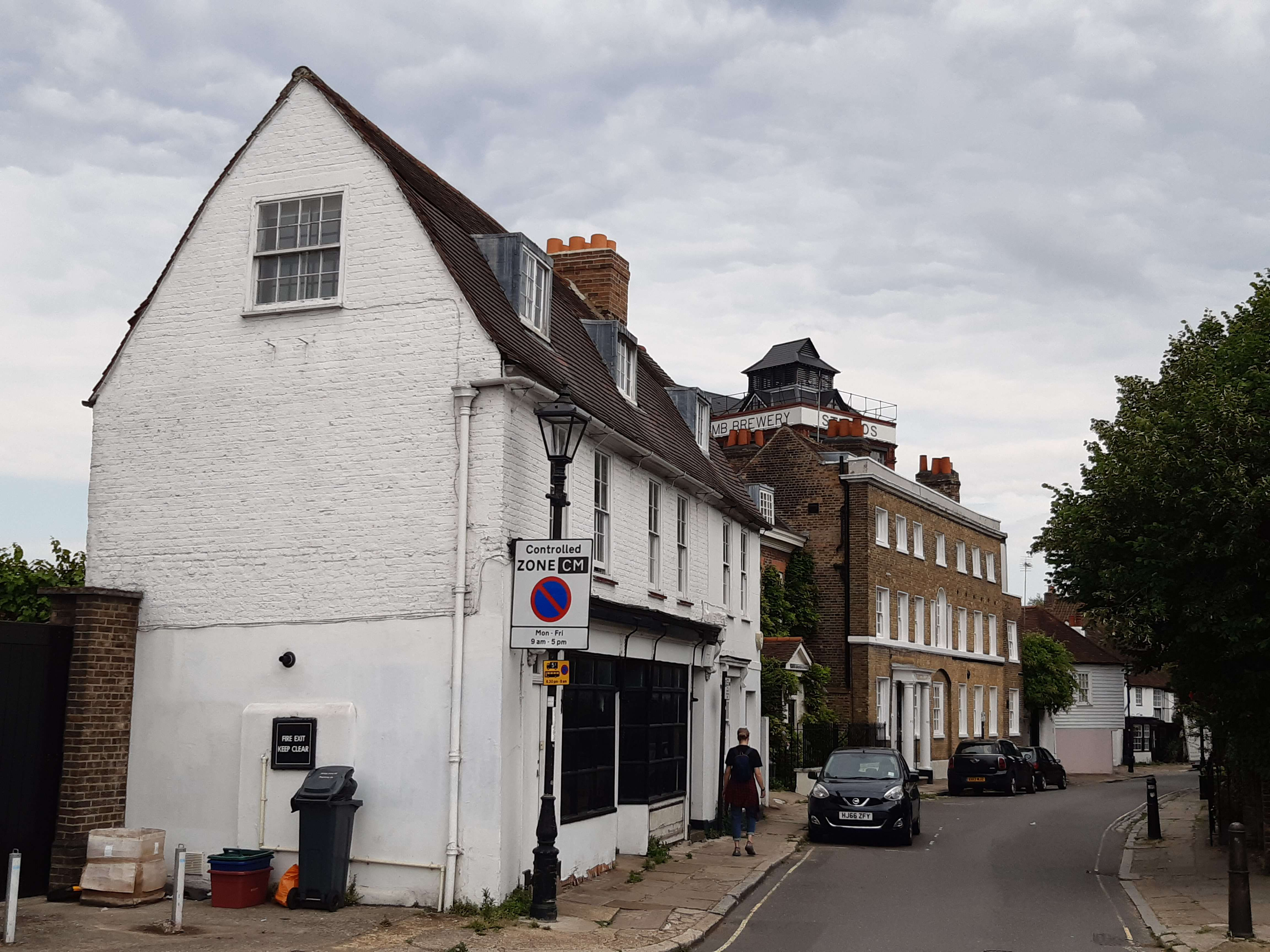
Church Street from the north, with the former post office where Jean-Jacques Rousseau had lodgings, 18th century

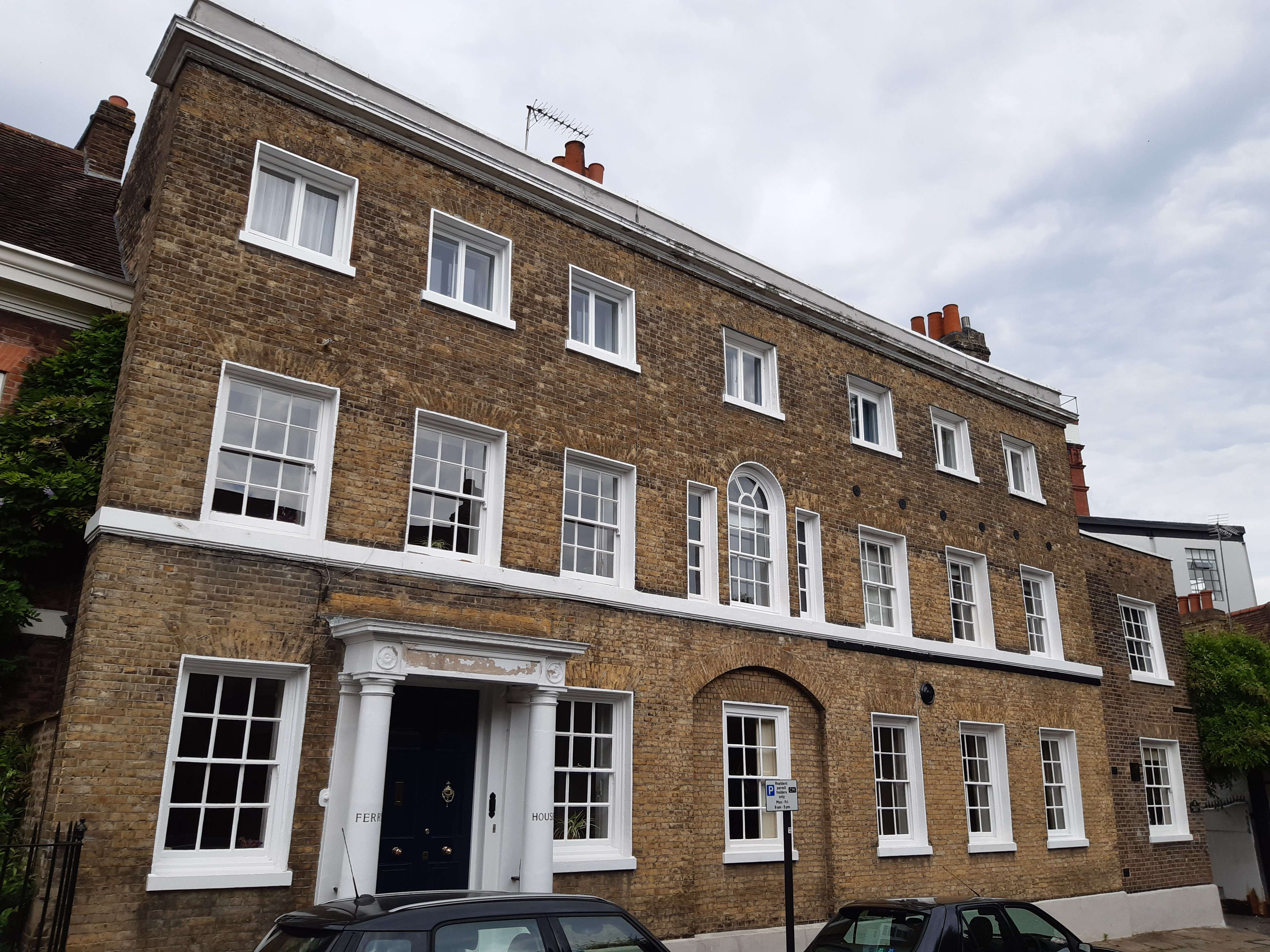
Ferry House, 18th century

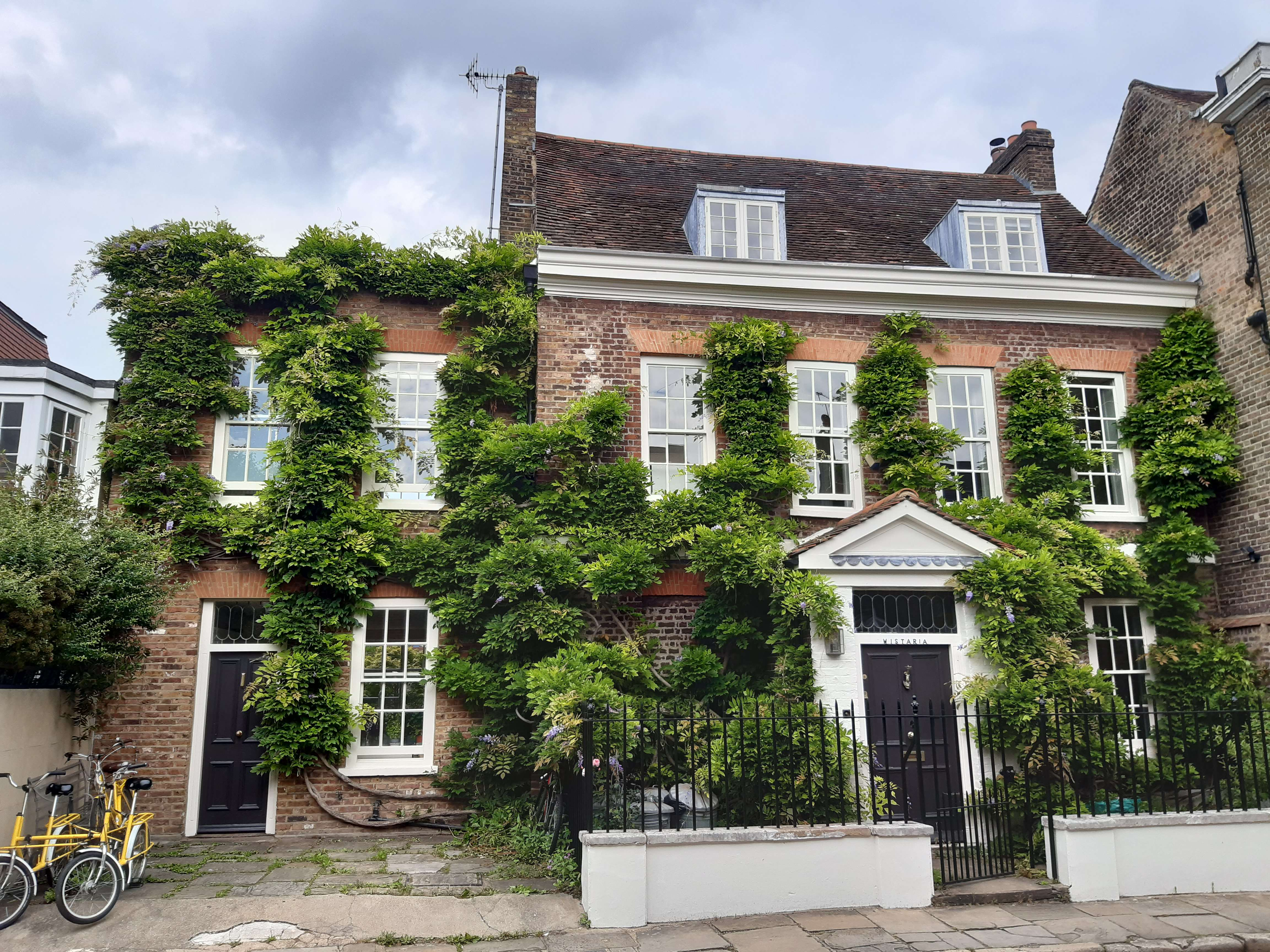
Wistaria House, 18th century

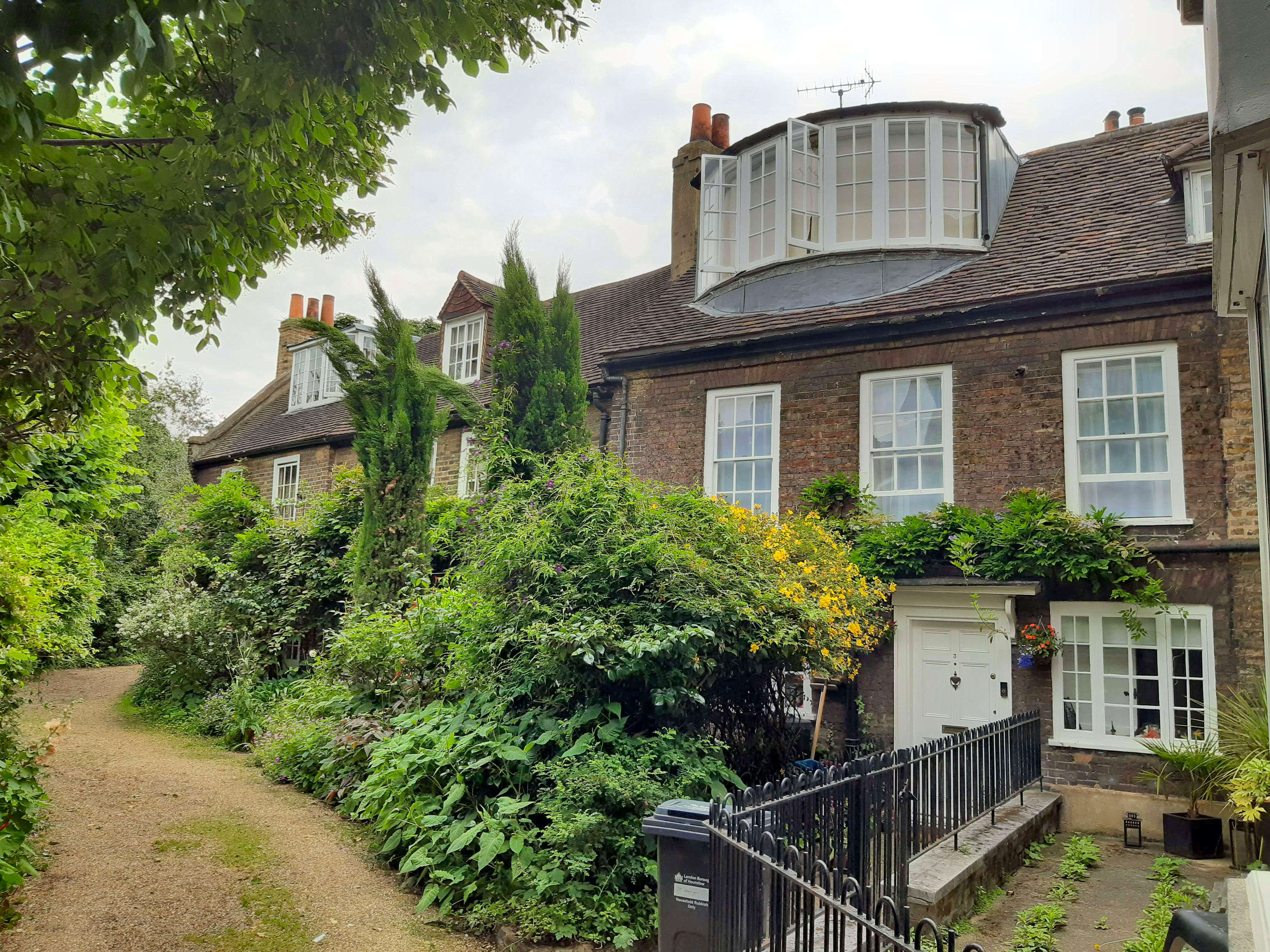
Pages Yard, 17th century

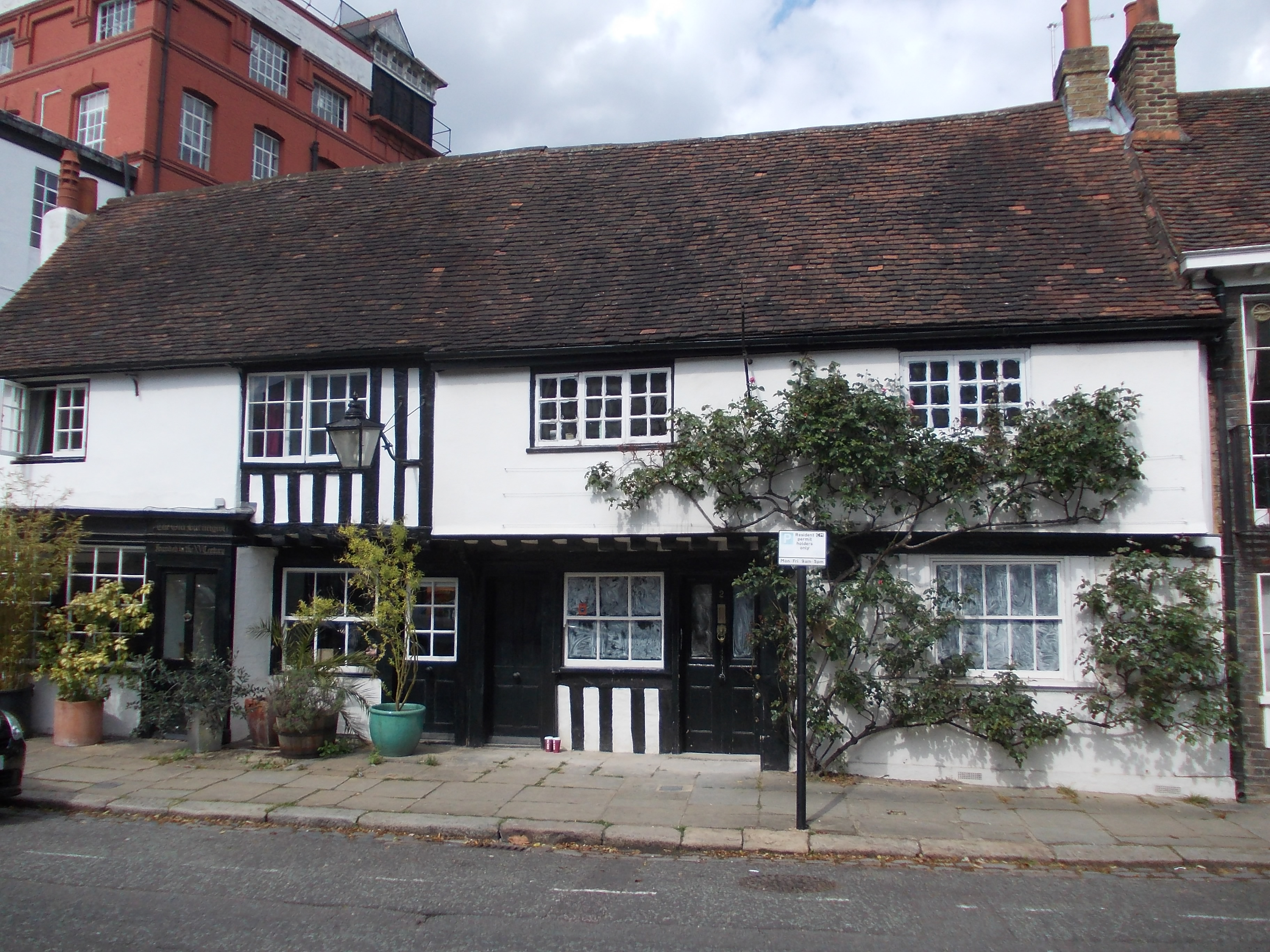
The former Burlington Arms, 15th century

=== Chiswick Mall ===
Chiswick Mall is a riverside street running downstream from St Nicholas Church. It is largely occupied by a series of grand houses, built by the wealthy to take advantage of its riverside setting. The largest and one of the finest is the Grade I listed Walpole House.

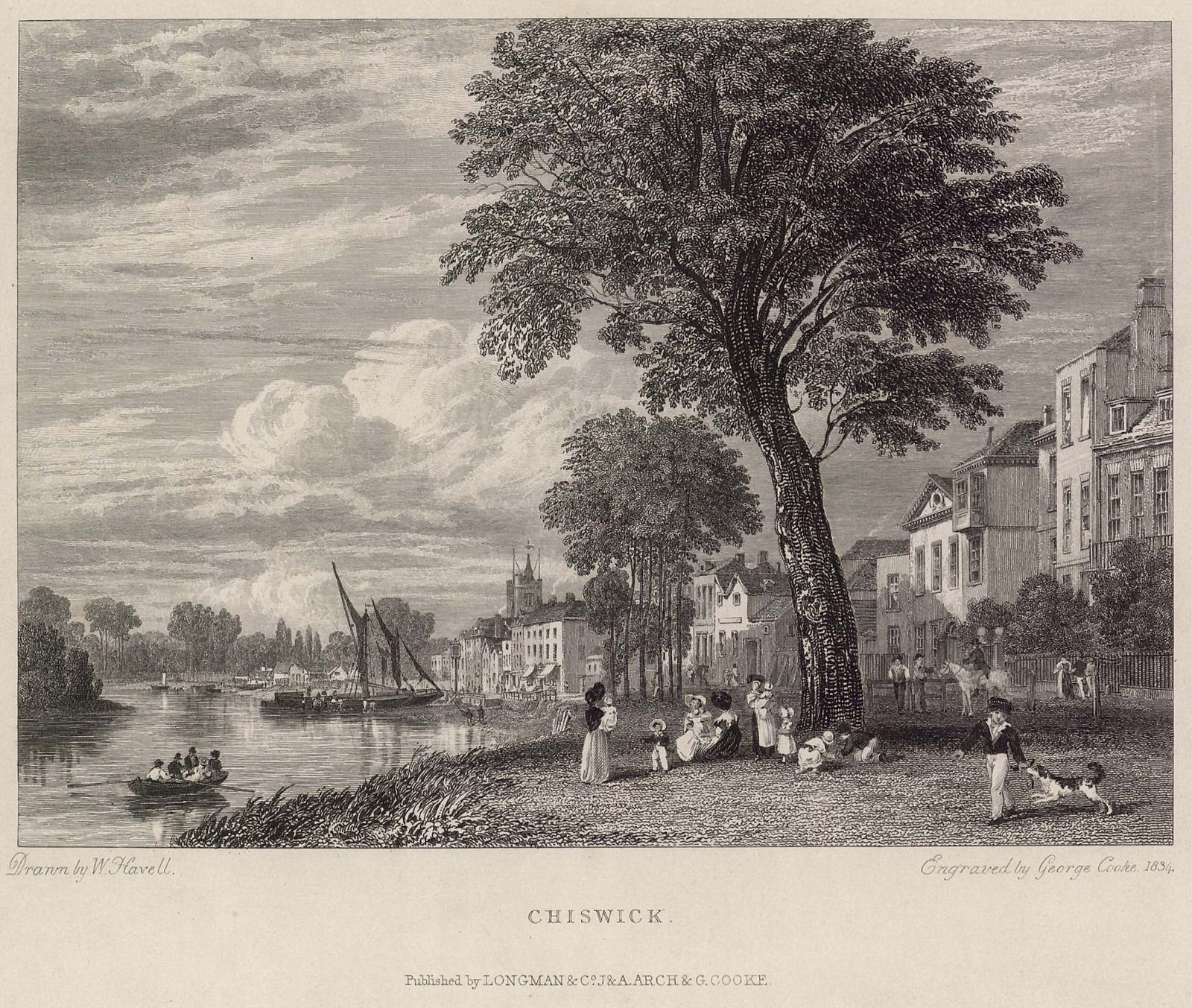
Engraving by George Cooke after William Havell, 1834. Looking upriver; a boat is unloading goods near some small shops.

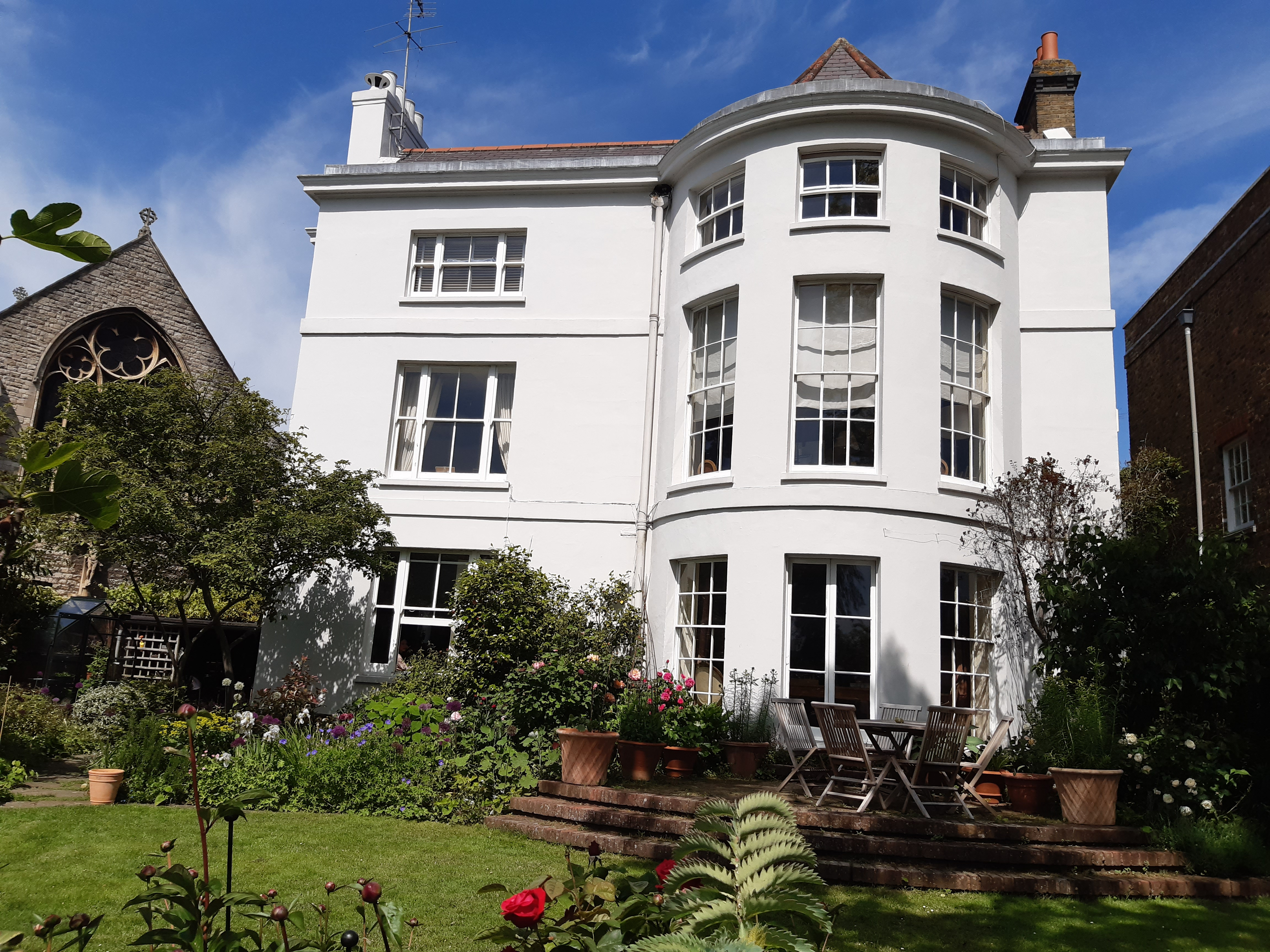
The Old Vicarage, with St Nicholas Church on the left

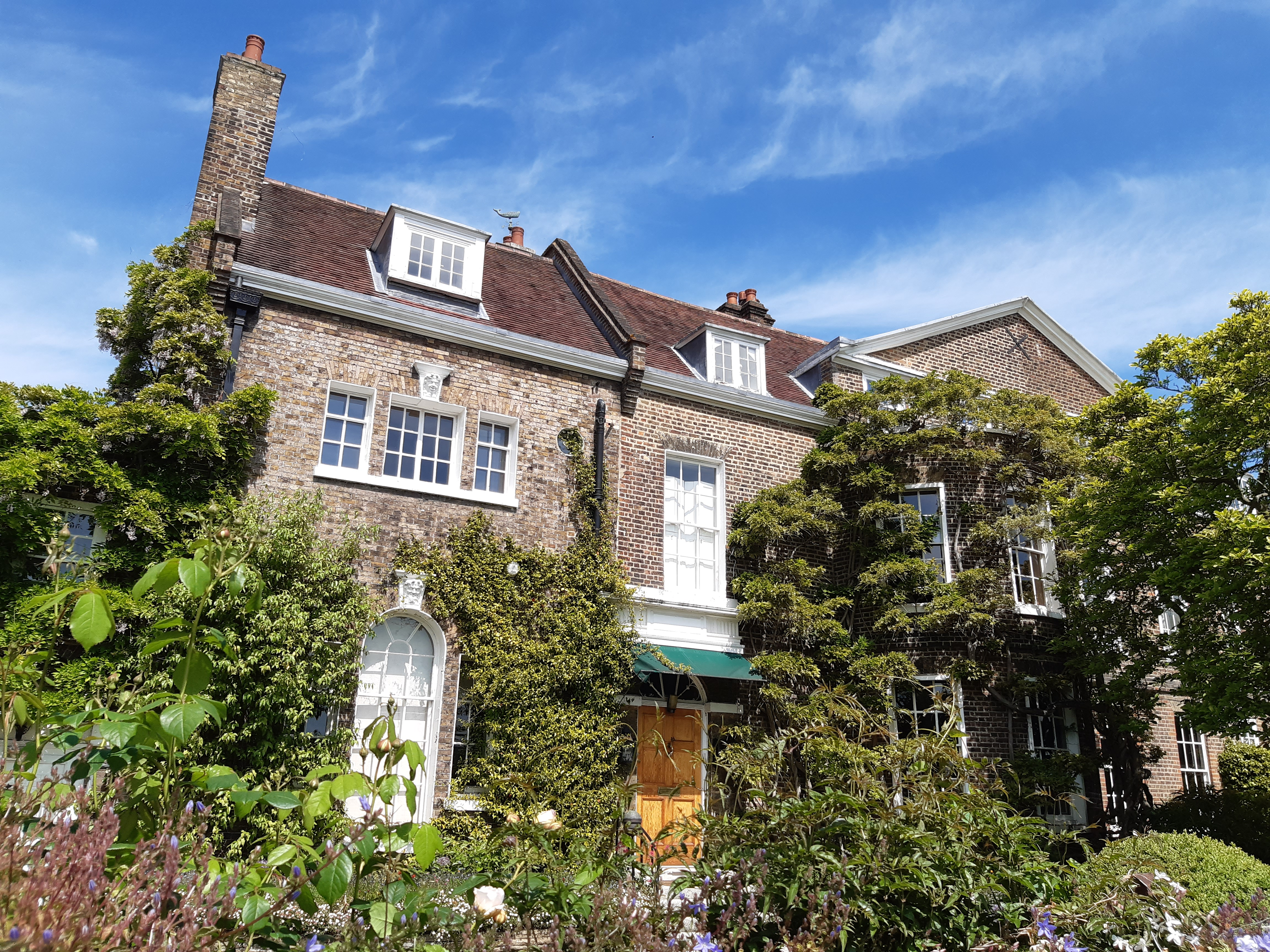
Bedford House

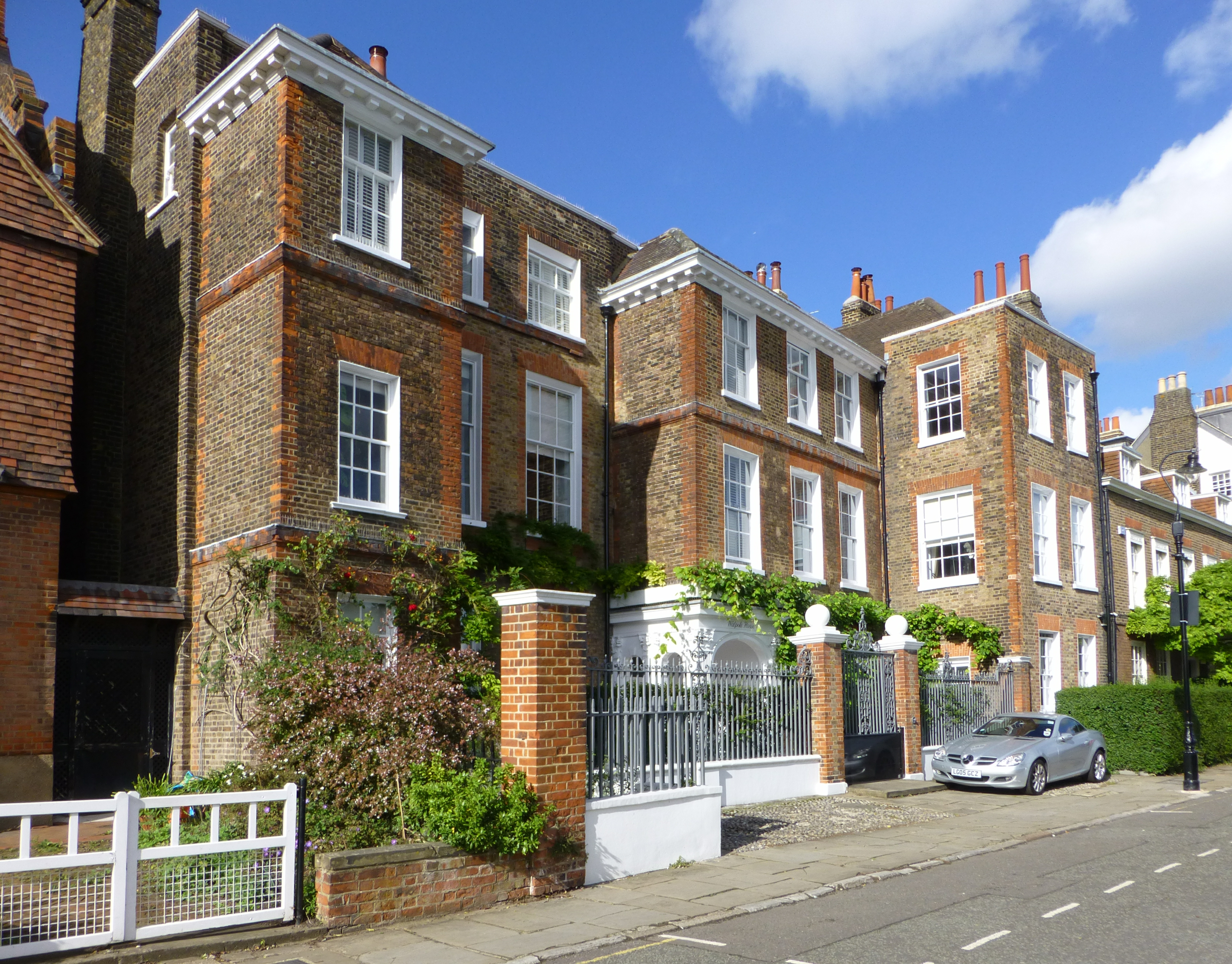
Walpole House, the largest of the grand houses on Chiswick Mall

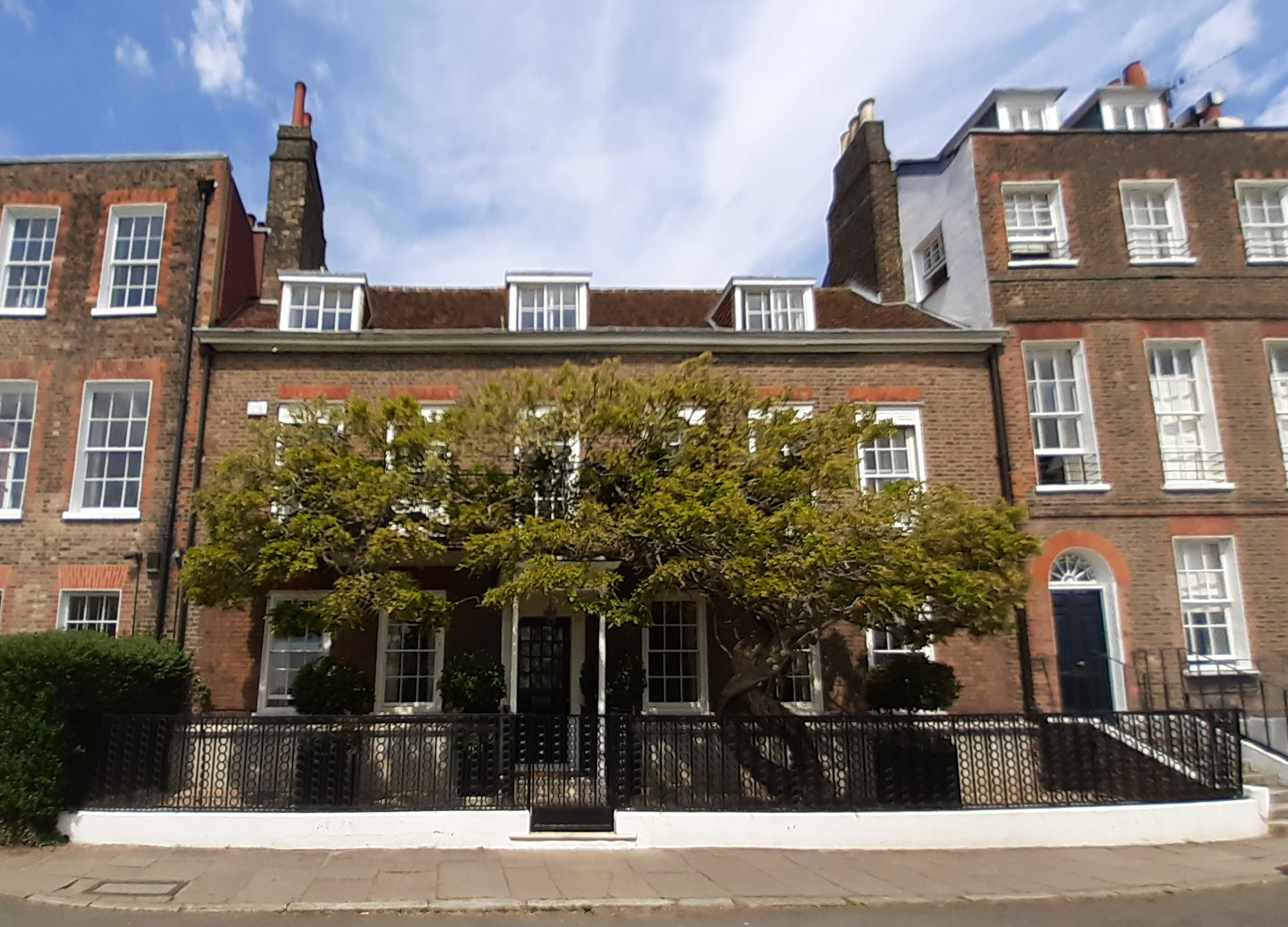
Strawberry House, with Morton House on right

=== Chiswick Square ===
Just off Burlington Lane, between the George and Devonshire and St Mary's Convent, is Chiswick Square, one of the smallest squares in London. It is paved, and has a formal arrangement of walls and flowerbeds. Facing the square's entrance is the large 3-storey Grade II listed Boston House, built in 1740, behind its wrought-iron railings at the end. It was refaced later in the 18th century by Viscount Boston with brown brick and red dressings. When the house was sold in 1772 it was described as "the great house and offices ... with a great parlour hung with green Embos'd Paper and Prints compleat". It became a young ladies' school, possibly (along with Walpole House) helping to inspire Thackeray to feature such a school in his novel Vanity Fair; after that it became Nazareth House with Catholic nuns. Either side of the square are houses of dark brick, built c. 1680. A plaque in the square states that "into this garden Thackeray in Vanity Fair describes Becky Sharp as throwing the dictionary".

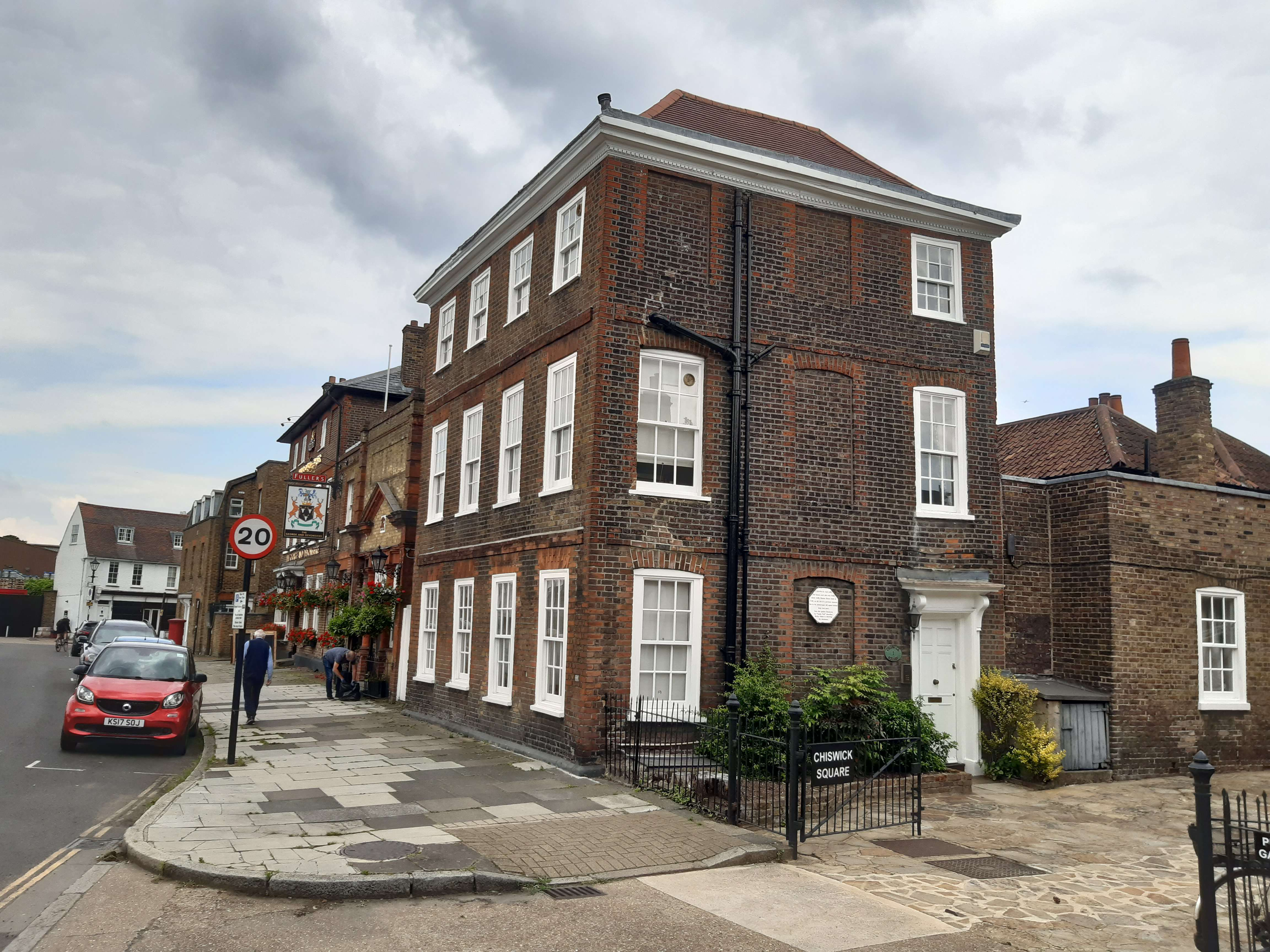
From Chiswick Square to the George and Devonshire along Burlington Lane

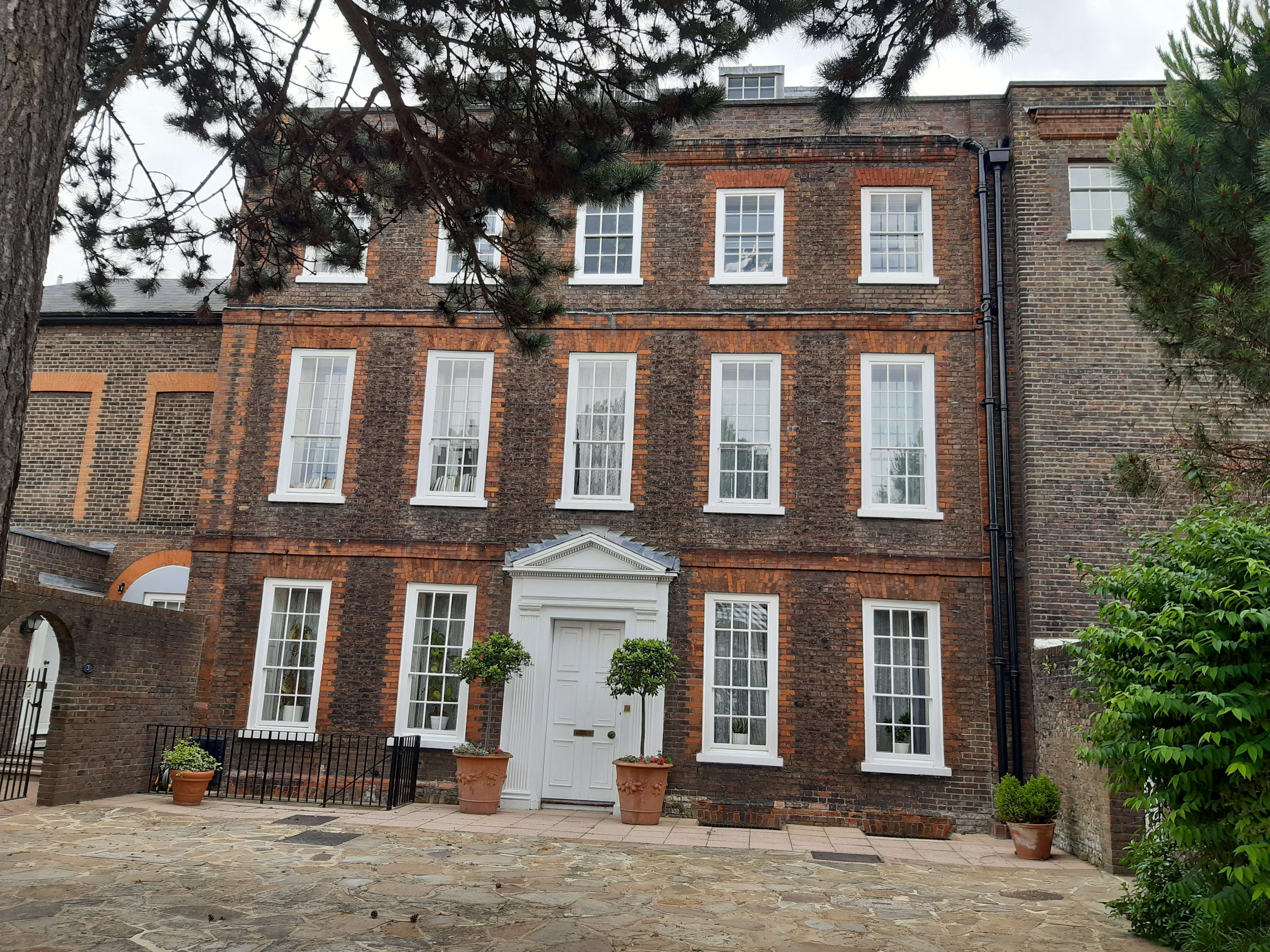
Boston House, Chiswick Square, built 1740

=== Breweries and public houses ===
Chiswick was and remains a place for brewing beer. By 1736, there were at least five malthouses in Chiswick. Beer was brewed at the Griffin Brewery and the Lamb Brewery; their old buildings survive. The Lamb brewery, right beside the Griffin, was run by the family of John Sich from 1790 to 1929. A large part of the area of Old Chiswick is still occupied by Fuller's Griffin Brewery.

Only two public houses now remain in Old Chiswick, the George and Devonshire on Burlington Lane, just off Church Street, and the double pub the Mawson Arms / Fox and Hounds at the corner of Chiswick Lane South and Mawson Lane.

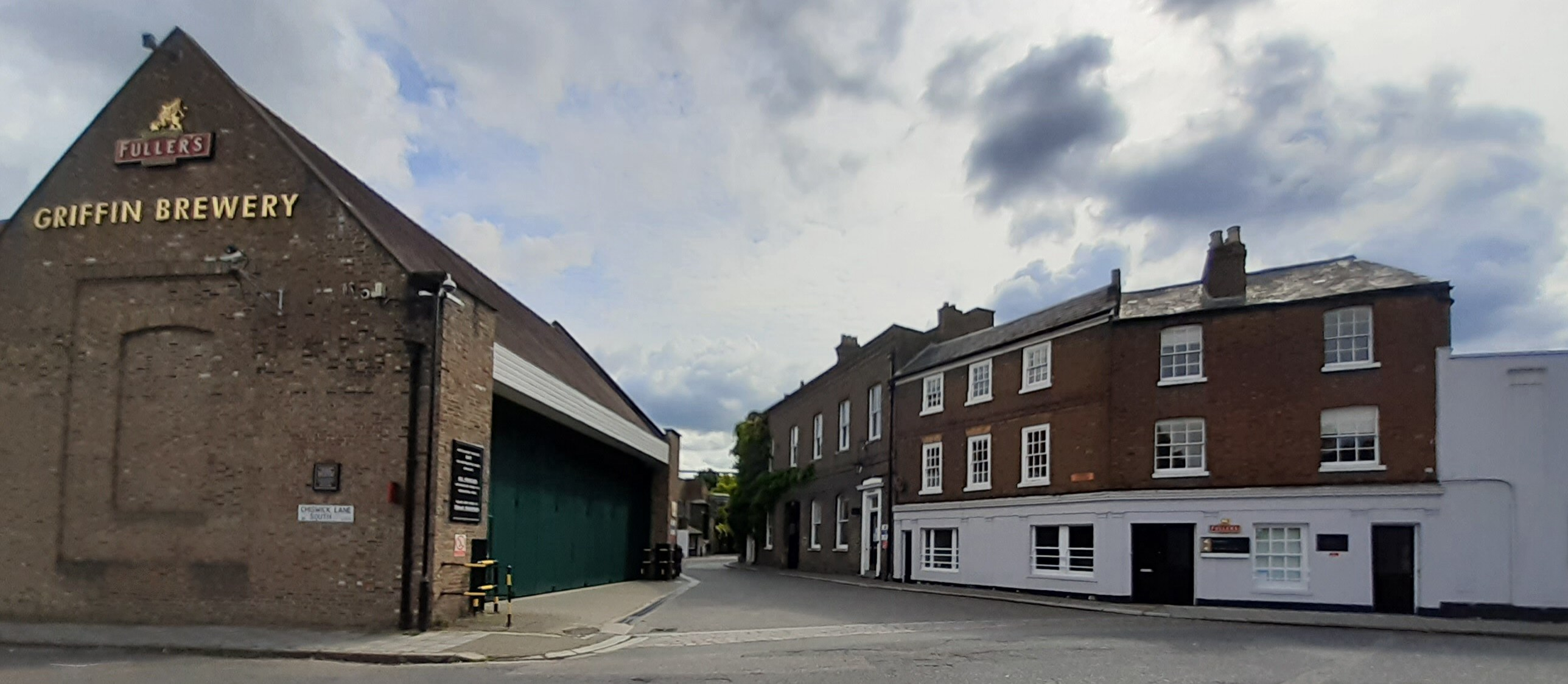
Griffin Brewery from Chiswick Lane South

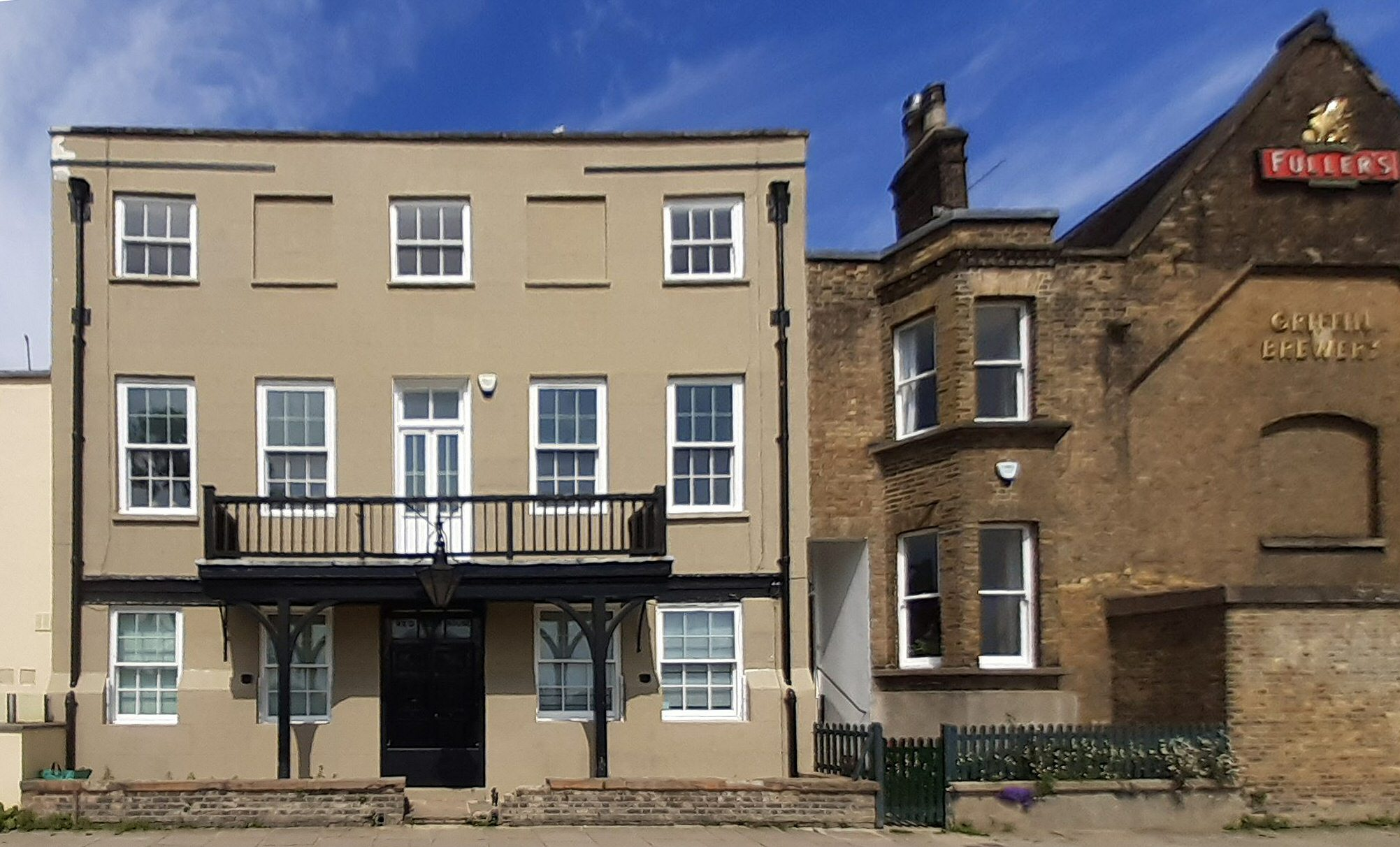
The Red Lion inn (closed 1916), Prospect Cottage and Griffin Brewery, Chiswick Mall

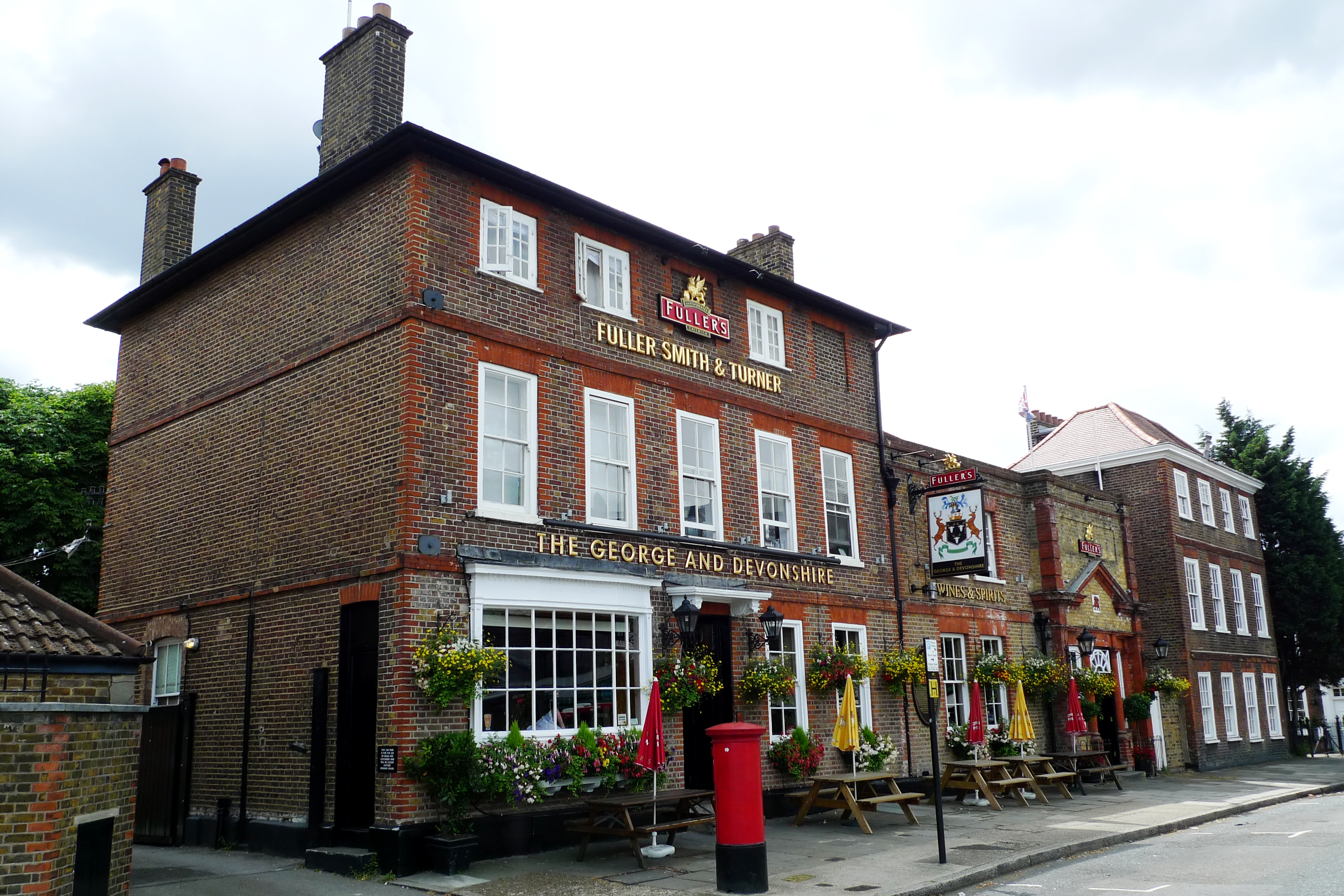
The George and Devonshire on Burlington Lane

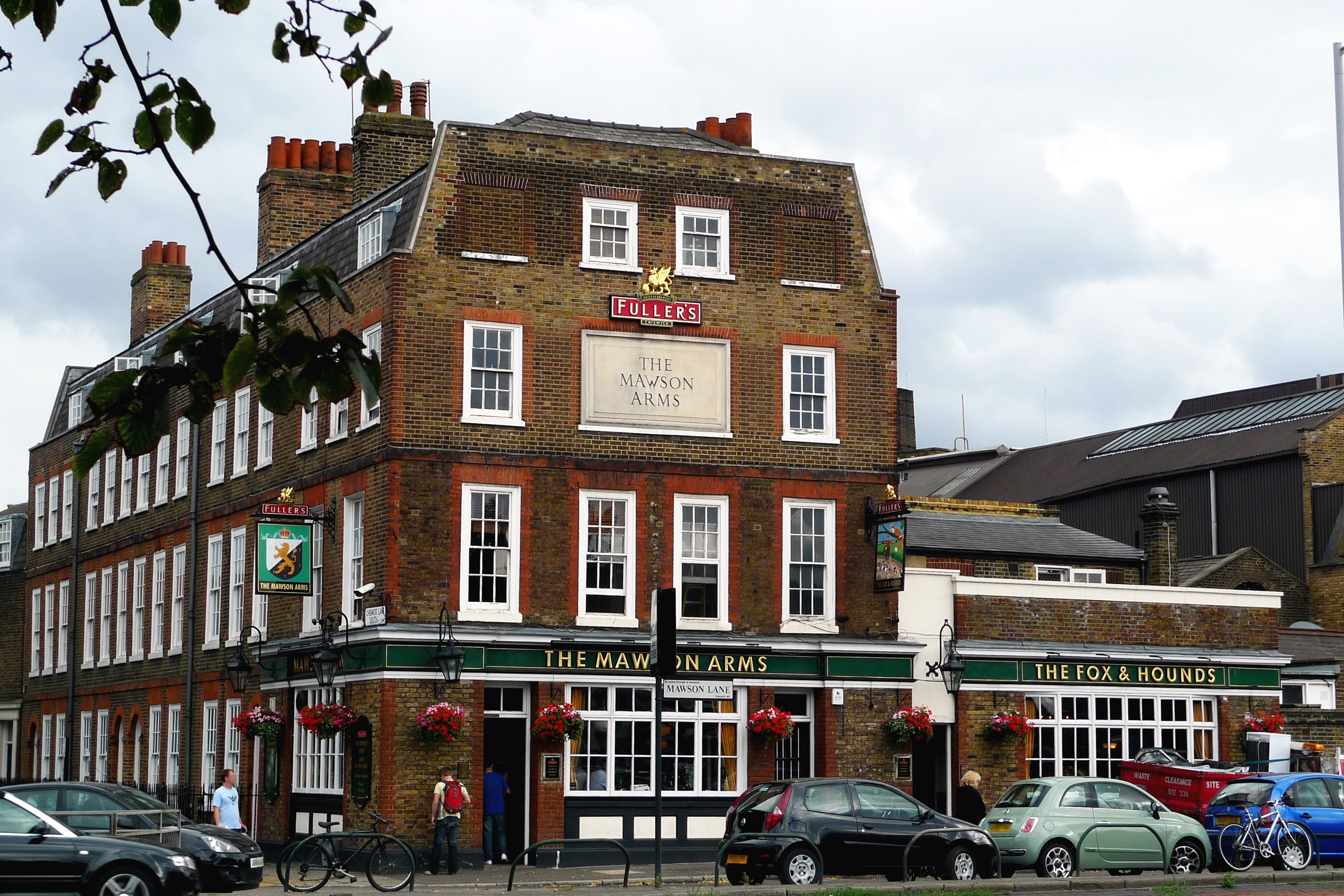
The Mawson Arms / Fox and Hounds, on Chiswick Lane South and Mawson Lane

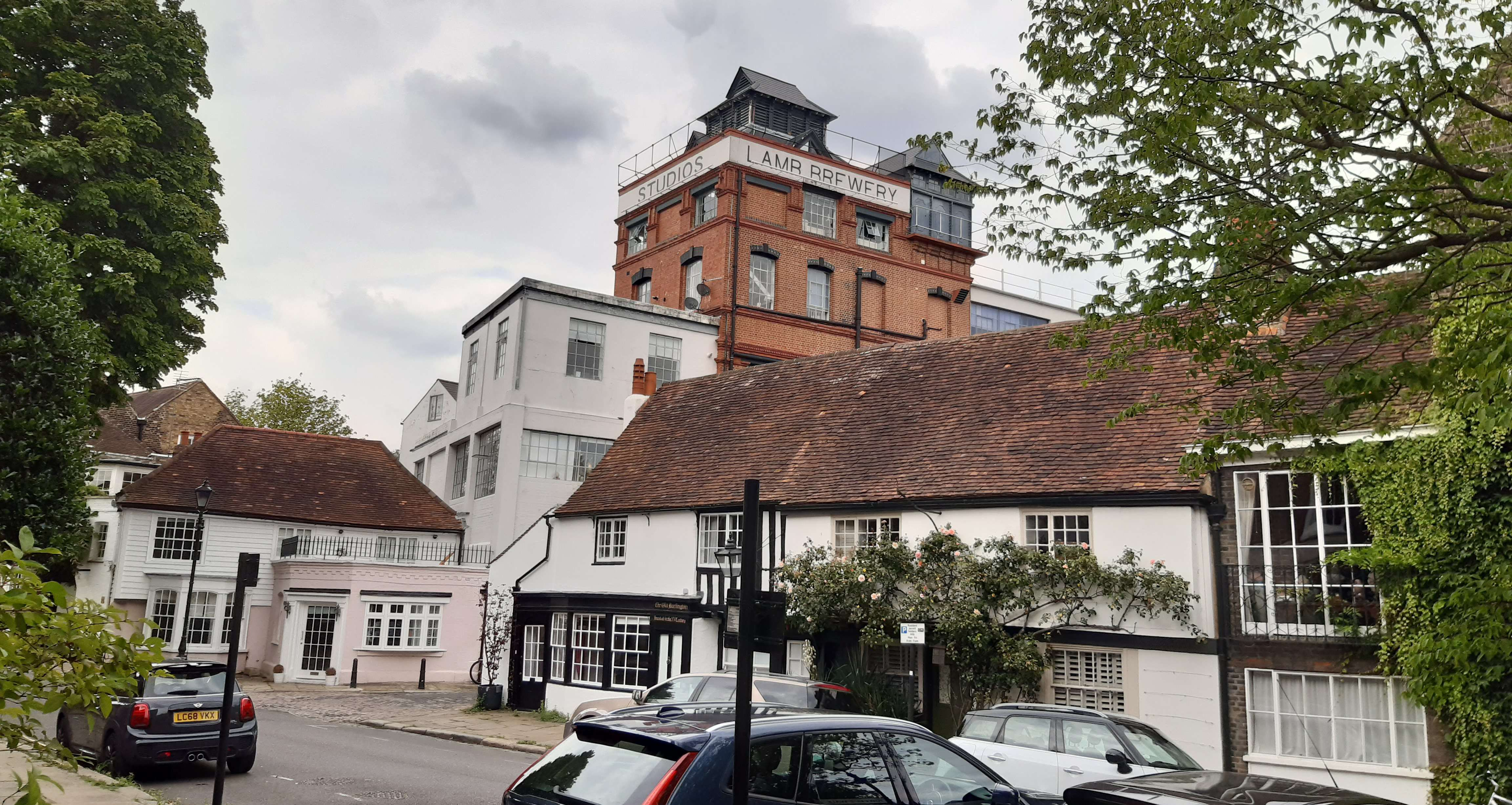
The Lamb Tap, Lamb Brewery and Burlington Arms, all now with other uses

=== Industry ===
In 1809, Charles Whittingham founded the Chiswick Press at High House (now Orford House) on Chiswick Mall; in 1818 it moved to College House. This was near the drawdock where loads of old marine rope made of hemp could be unloaded, to be recycled into a strong, silky paper by Whittingham's own paper-making process. The press made small low-priced books of high quality. William Morris used the press for some of his books, including his 1889 romance A Tale of the House of the Wolfings.

John Isaac Thornycroft, founder of the John I. Thornycroft & Company shipbuilding company, established a yard at Church Wharf at the west end of Chiswick Mall in 1864. The shipyard built the first naval destroyer, HMS Daring of the Daring class, in 1893. To cater for the increasing size of warships, Thornycroft moved its shipyard to Southampton in 1909.

In 1878, Dan and Charles Mason started the Chiswick Soap Company on Burlington Lane. One of their chemists developed Cherry Blossom boot polish in 1906; a small tin of it retailed initially for one penny, and it became a well-known product. The company became the Chiswick Polish Company in 1926, and Chiswick Products Ltd in 1930. The business was sold to Reckitt and Colman in 1954; it built a new factory at the Hogarth Roundabout in 1967, on the site of the Hogarth Business Park; this was closed and demolished in 1974.

Chiswick Press trademark

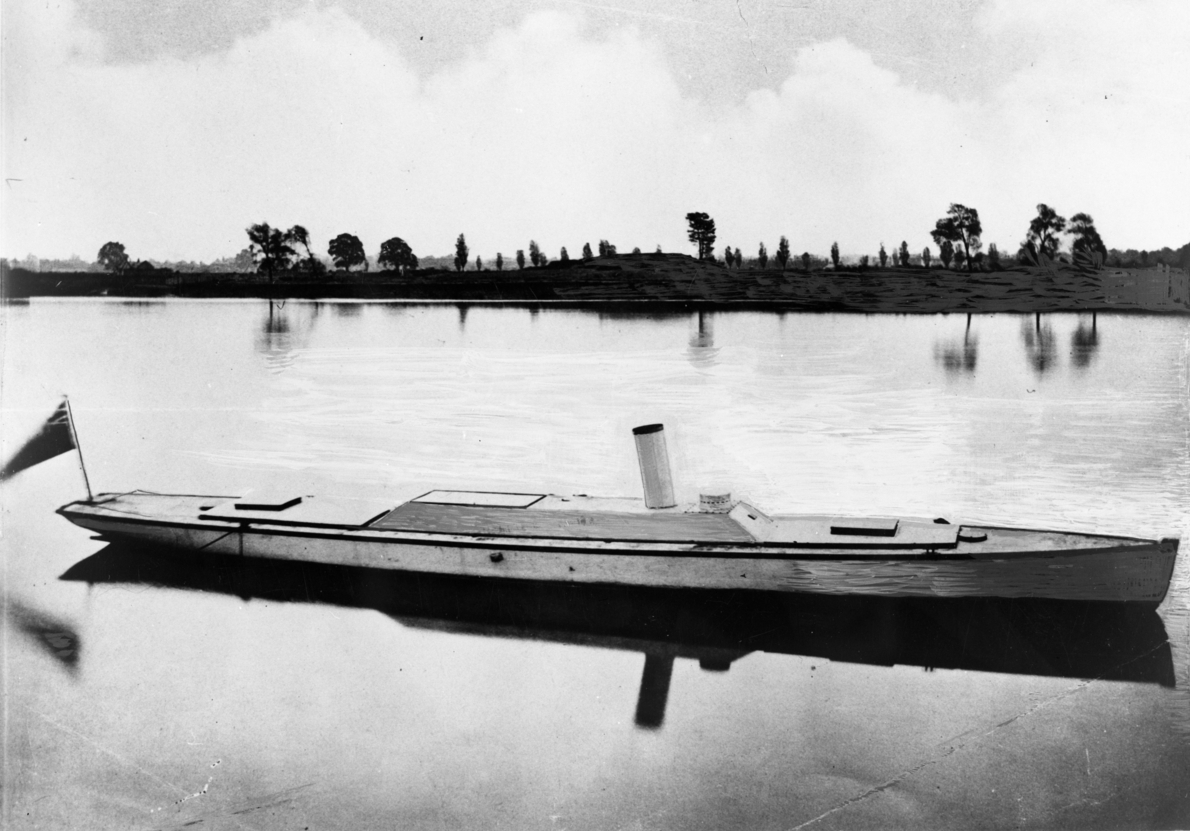
The torpedo boat Maelstrom at the John I. Thornycroft & Company yard in Chiswick, 1873

=== St Mary's Convent ===
In 1896, the Anglican Order of St Mary and St John built what is now St Mary's Convent and Nursing Home on Burlington Lane, consulting with Florence Nightingale about the design of its hospital. It has at its core an Arts and Crafts Gothic building by the ecclesiastical architect Charles Ford Whitcombe. Its chapel has a small square tower with a weather vane atop a slender conical spire; inside the chapel is a classical reredos, ceiling paintings by George Ostrehan, and a tapestry panel by Morris & Co. It is now run by the Society of Saint Margaret.

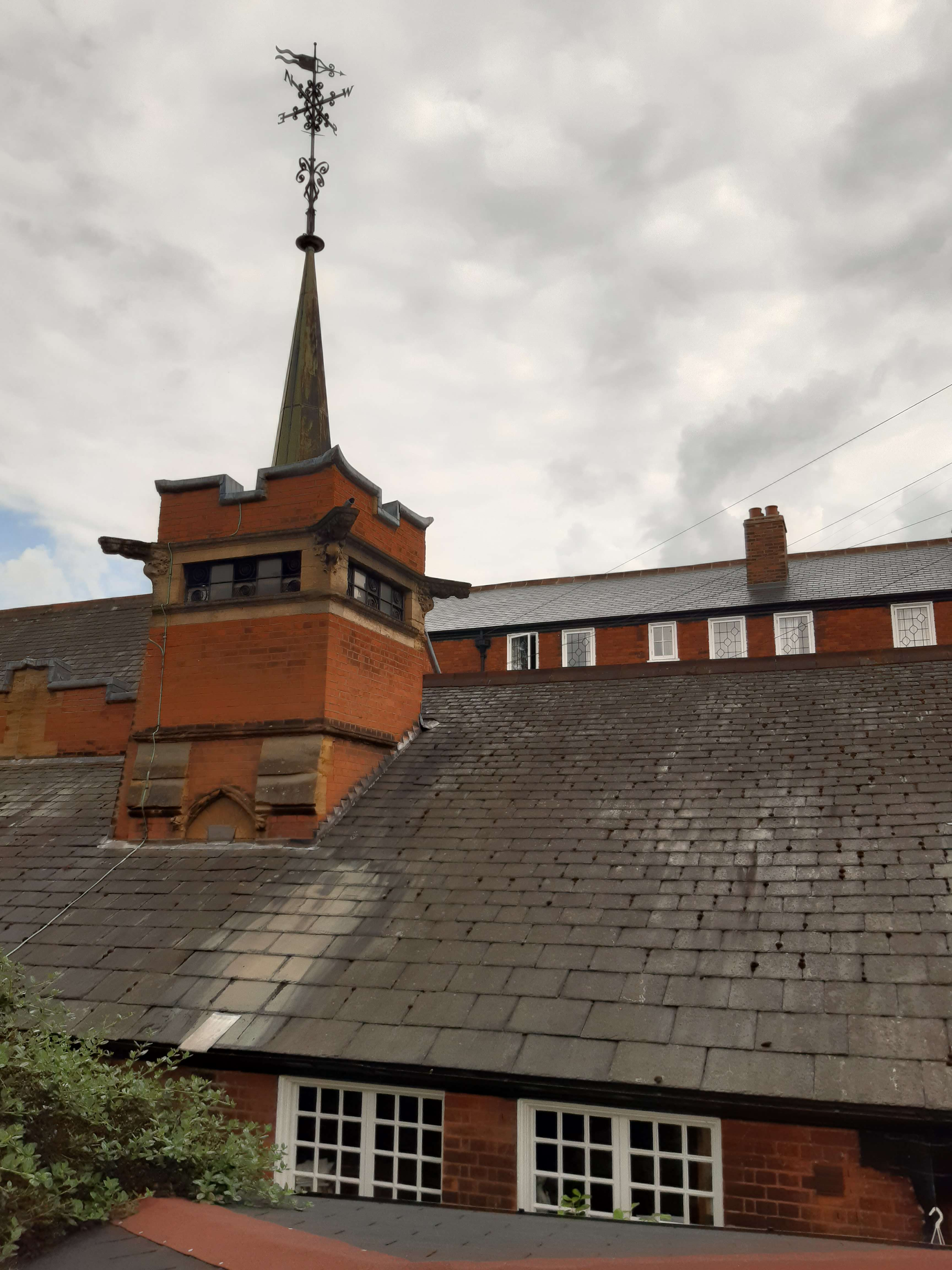
Chapel tower and weather vane, St Mary's Convent, 1896

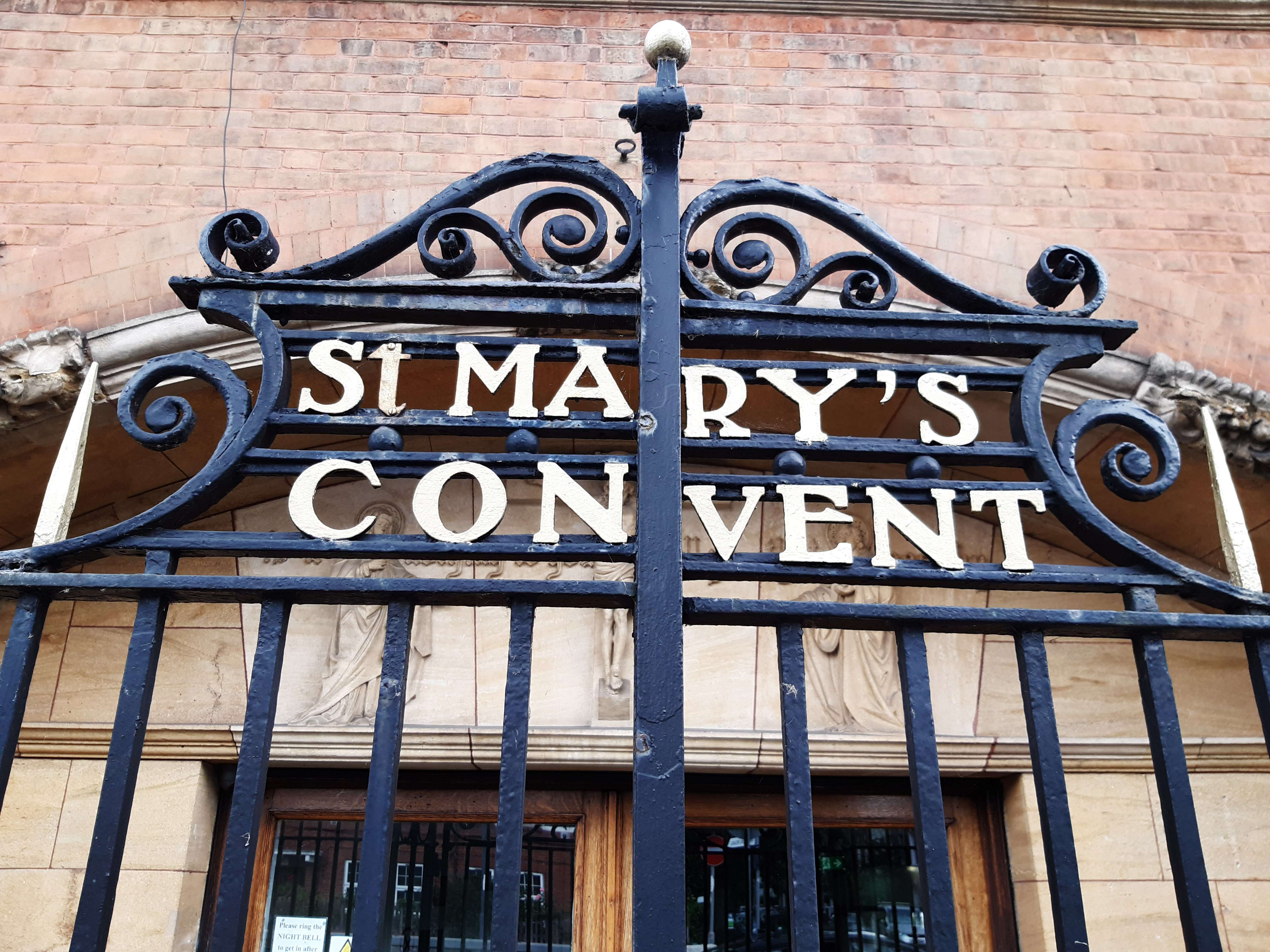
Wrought iron gate

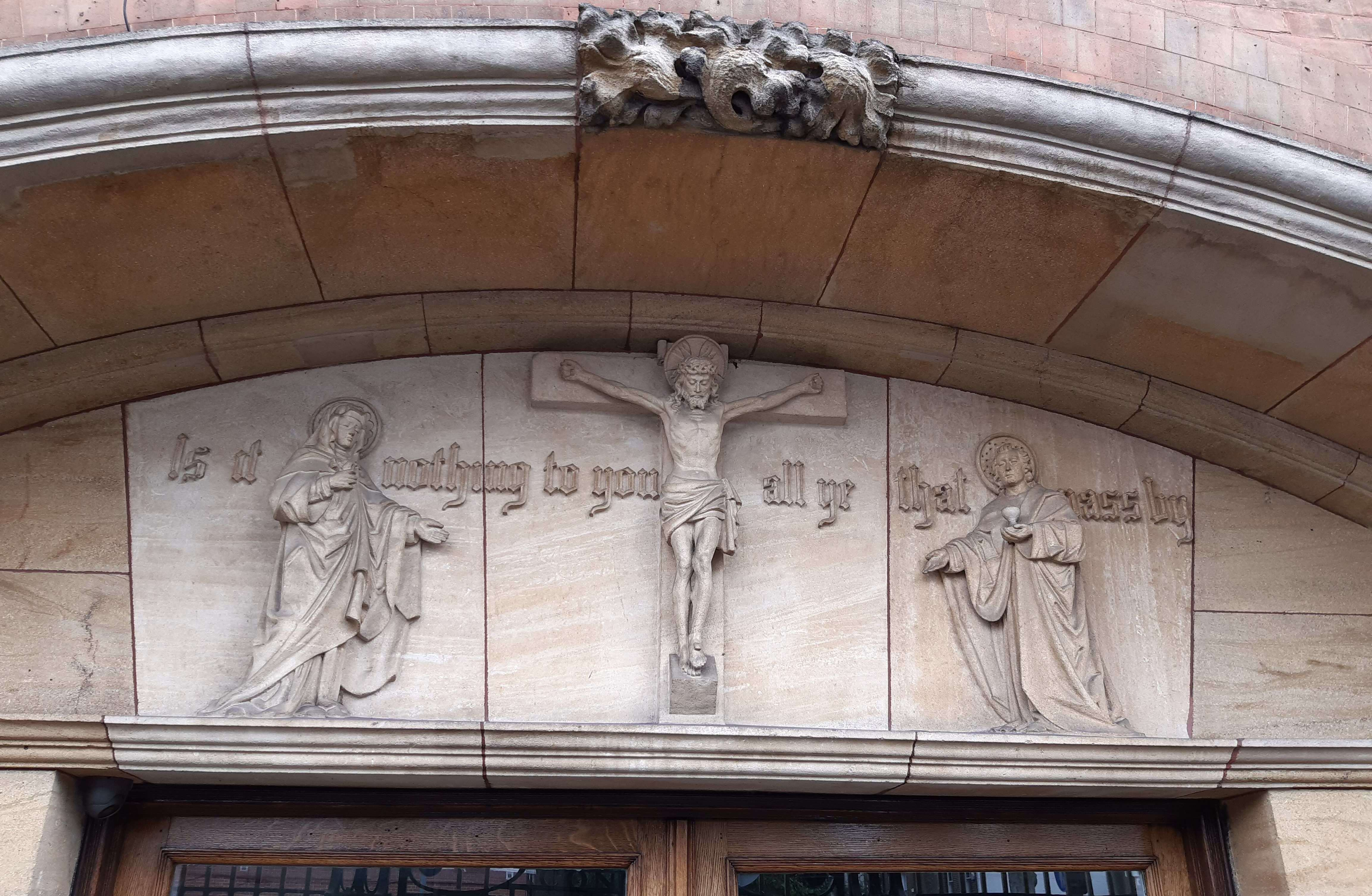
'Is it nothing to you all ye that pass by'

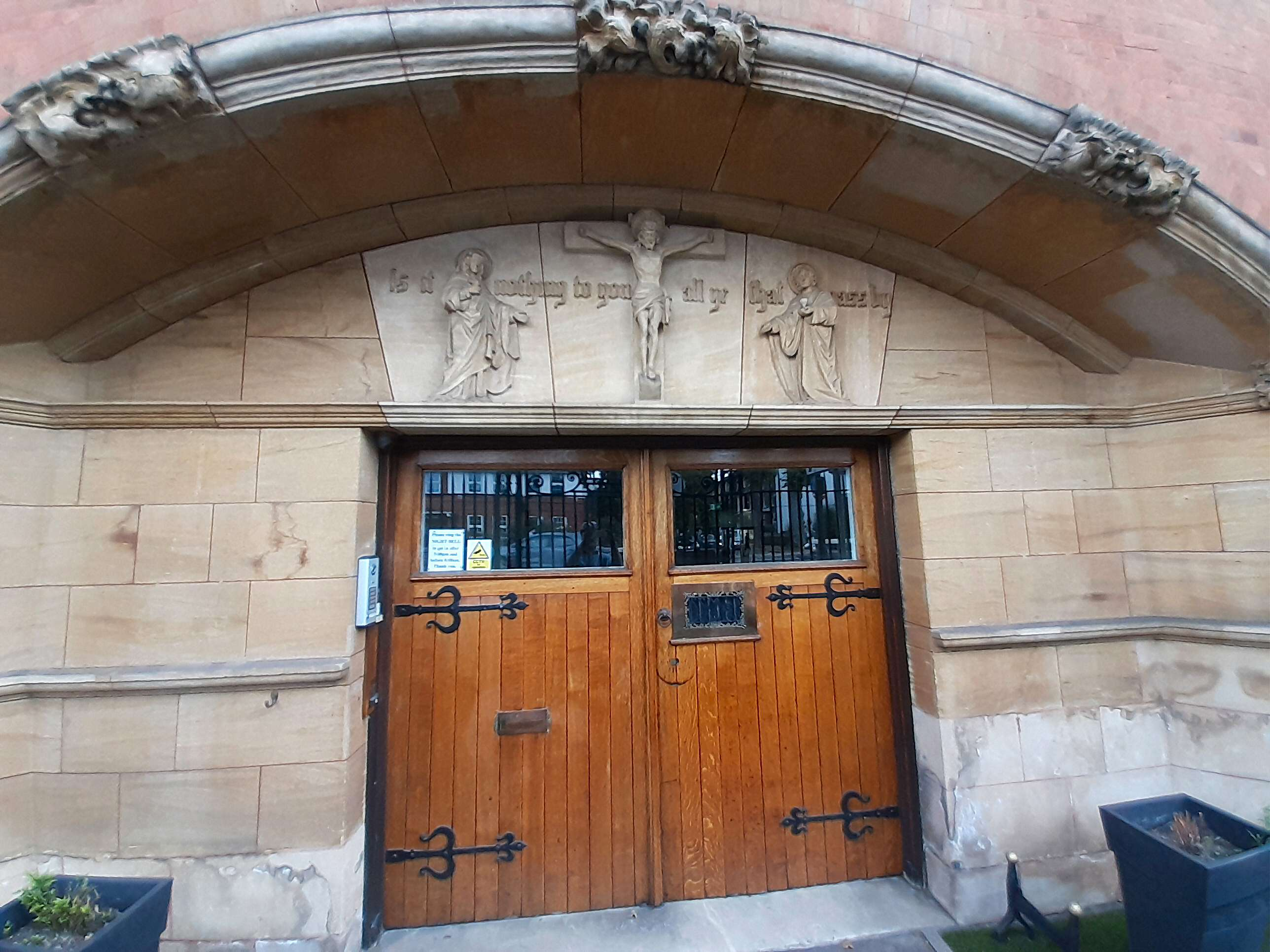
Doorway

=== Chiswick New Town ===
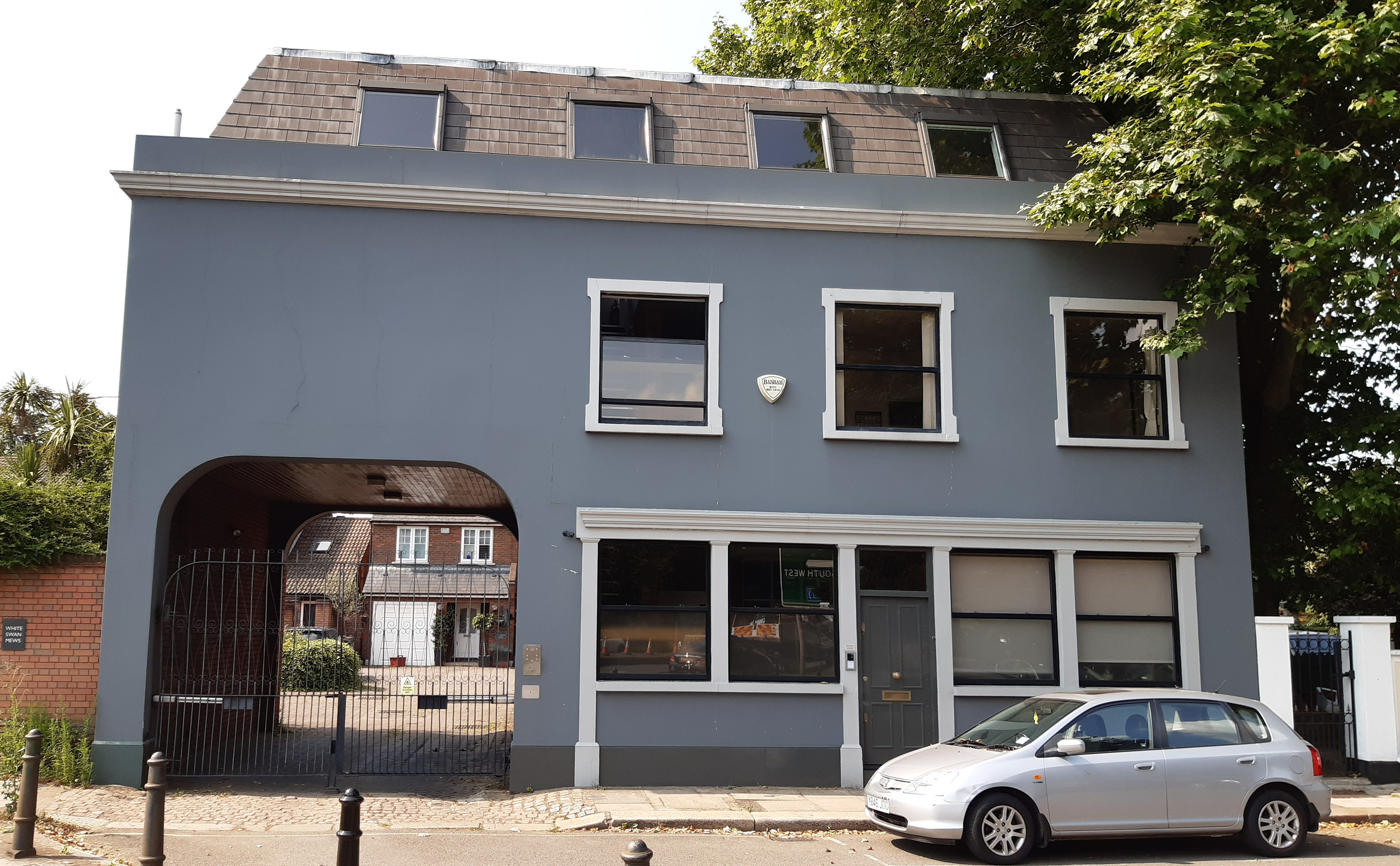
The former White Swan pub, Bennett Street, a remnant of Chiswick New Town

Just north of Hogarth Lane, Old Chiswick was extended northwestwards from the 1820s with a grid of small streets as far as Devonshire Road to create "Chiswick New Town". Some 375 houses were built over the next century on the 11-acre plot. The houses were poorly supplied with water and drainage. Some were destroyed by bombing in the Second World War, some by the widening of Hogarth Lane into the A4 dual carriageway, and the rest by the 1950s slum clearance, leaving only one building, the White Swan pub, also called "The Dirty Duck". The building started out as "Florey's Brewhouse" on Bennett Street in 1834, built for Charles Florey. In 1882 it was sold to the brewers Crowley Bros., and renamed "The White Swan". The surviving facade is most likely of that date. The arch allowed costermongers to bring donkeys and carts through to stables behind the pub. Charrington's closed the pub in 1979.

== Sources ==
- Bolton, Diane K.; Croot, Patricia E. C.; Hicks, M. A. (1982). "Chiswick: Growth". In T. F. T. Baker; C. R. Elrington (eds.). A History of the County of Middlesex, Volume 7, Acton, Chiswick, Ealing and Brentford, West Twyford, Willesden. London: British History Online. pp. 54–68.
- Clegg, Gillian (1995). Chiswick Past. Historical Publications. ISBN 0-94866-733-8.
- Clegg, Gillian (2021). "Grand Houses". Brentford & Chiswick Local History Society.
- Cherry, Bridget; Pevsner, Nikolaus (1991). The Buildings of England. London 3: North West. London: Penguin Books. ISBN 978-0-14-071048-9. OCLC 24722942.
- Hounslow (November 2018). OLD CHISWICK: Conservation Area Appraisal: Consultation Draft (PDF). London Borough of Hounslow. Archived from the original (PDF) on 2020-12-07.
