= History of London (1775 book) =

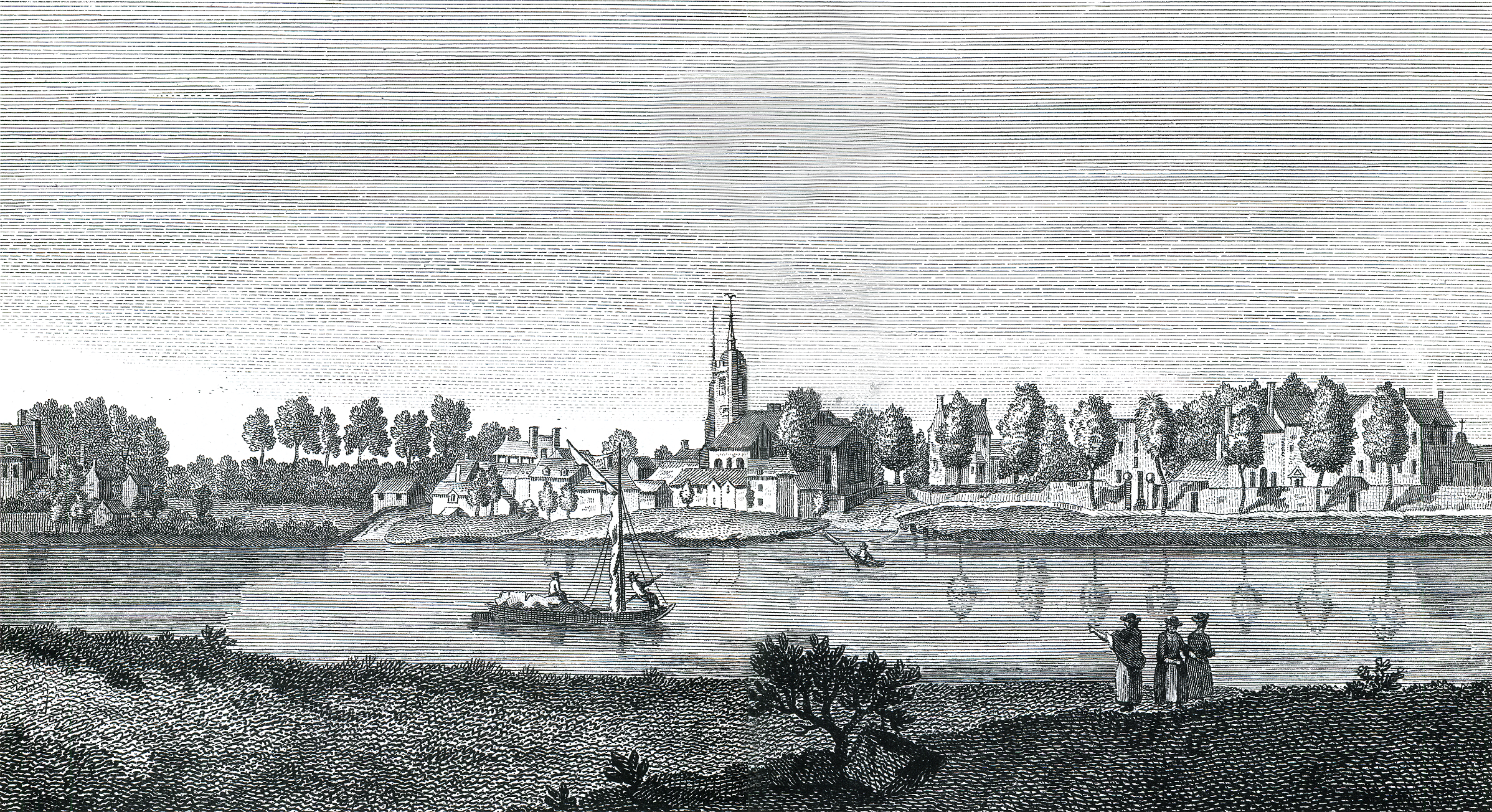
Chiswick from the river, in Walter Harrison's History of London, 1775

A New and Universal History, Description and Survey of the Cities of London and Westminster, the Borough of Southwark, and their Adjacent Parts... by Walter Harrison is a 1775 book illustrated with 102 monochrome plates, describing the appearance of London at that time. It was published by John Cooke in 70 parts. These were issued weekly, each with one or two of the plates. The illustrations were prints made using engraved copper plates.
