= Mawson Arms =

Pub in Chiswick, London

Coordinates: 51°29′17″N 0°14′59″W

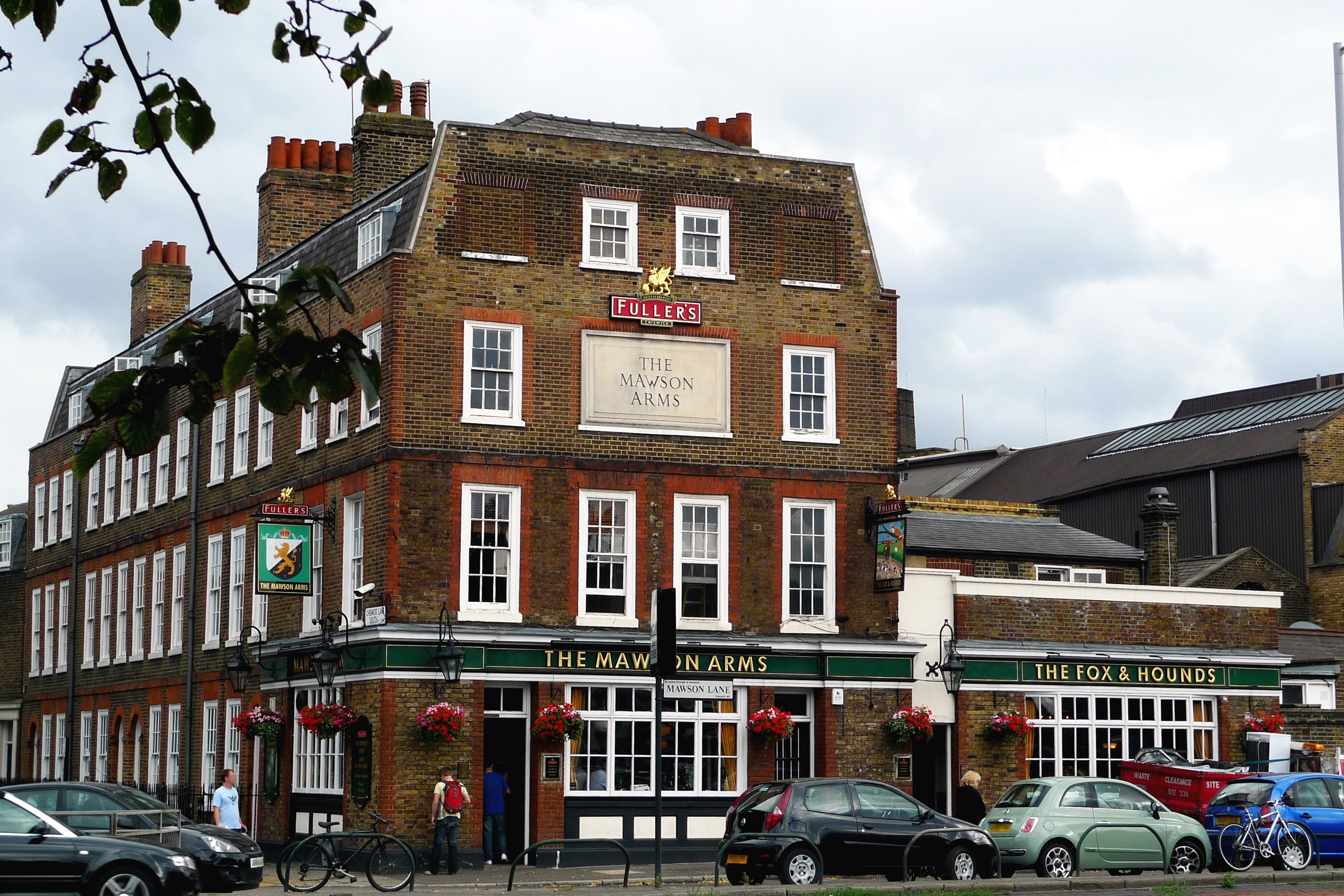
The Mawson Arms (left) and Fox and Hounds (right), in 2012

The Mawson Arms/Fox and Hounds is a Grade II* listed public house at 110 Chiswick Lane South. It is at the end of a terrace of five listed houses named Mawson Row in Old Chiswick. This was built in about 1715 for Thomas Mawson, the owner of what became Fuller's Griffin Brewery, which they adjoin.

The pub was once two separate pubs that now operate as one, but both names have been retained, with the pub having a separate hanging sign for each name, and different names printed along different parts of the building. It is one of very few pubs in England with two official names. Apparently a former landlord had not properly understood the licensing laws, and had split the pub into an ale house and a separate wines and spirits bar.

== Architecture ==
In position the terrace of five houses culminates in this grand end terrace at the London corner of the Griffin Brewery block.

Its four-storey end-terrace house was long ago extended by one-to-two storeys along Old Chiswick's Mawson Lane to increase the ground floor pub premises. Above (on north and east sides, the principal façades) are tall white-framed sash windows with red dressings. These are set in walls of stock brick from red-brown fading into brown-yellow to the third storey, two bays of which are given over and united into a hard stone or concrete plaque, deep-etched as "THE MAWSON ARMS". The fourth storey is in a mansard roof setting with a further squat loft storey above.

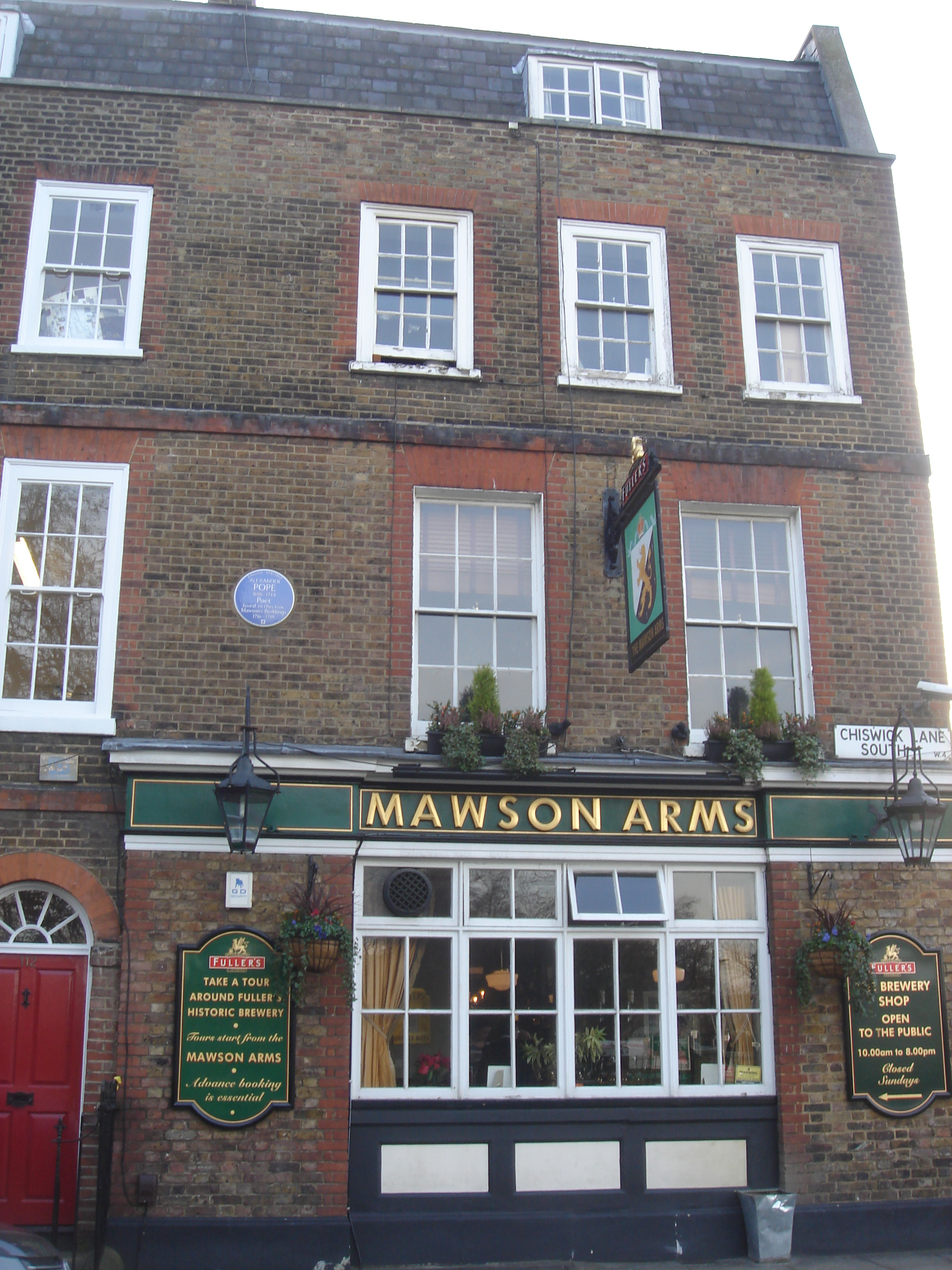
Mawson Arms

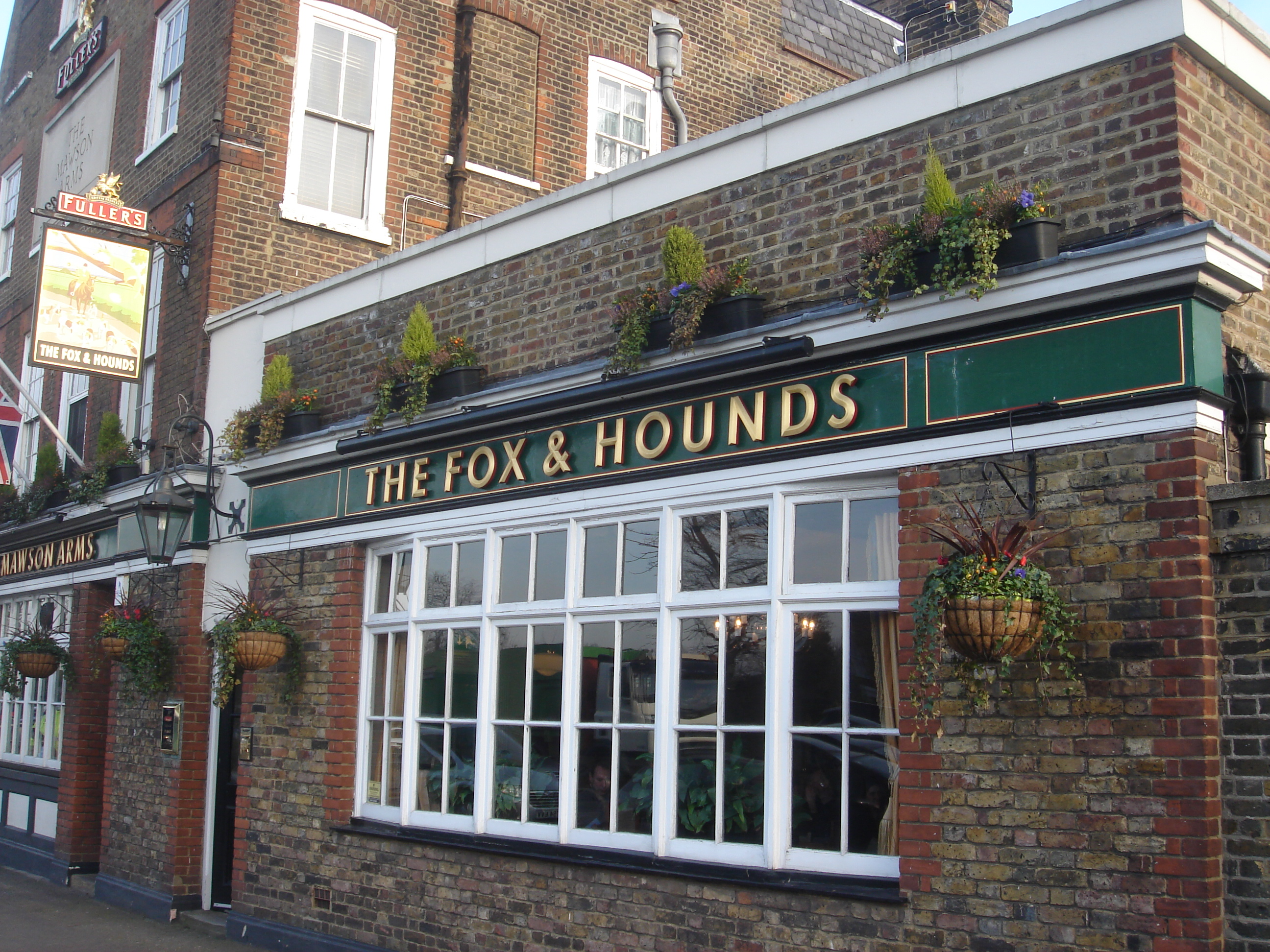
The Fox and Hounds

== History ==
The building, not then a pub, was from 1716 to 1719 a home of the 18th-century poet Alexander Pope. A blue plaque is fixed to the frontage accordingly. He was known for quotations, satirical verse, and for his translation of Homer. Locally he is known for his grander home, Pope Villa at Twickenham, the legacy of which is Pope's Grotto and parts of Radnor Gardens.

The pub was renamed the Fox and Hounds in 1772, and then the Mawson Arms/Fox and Hounds in 1899 (when the it was extended into the corner building). Until 1898, the pub occupied a building 55m south on Mawson Row, next to today's brewery shop.

Following the sale of the Griffin Brewery to Asahi, the owners – Fuller, Smith & Turner – sold the pub and adjoining buildings in a separate sale.
