= George and Devonshire =

Pub in Chiswick, London

Coordinates: 51.486487°N 0.25196°W

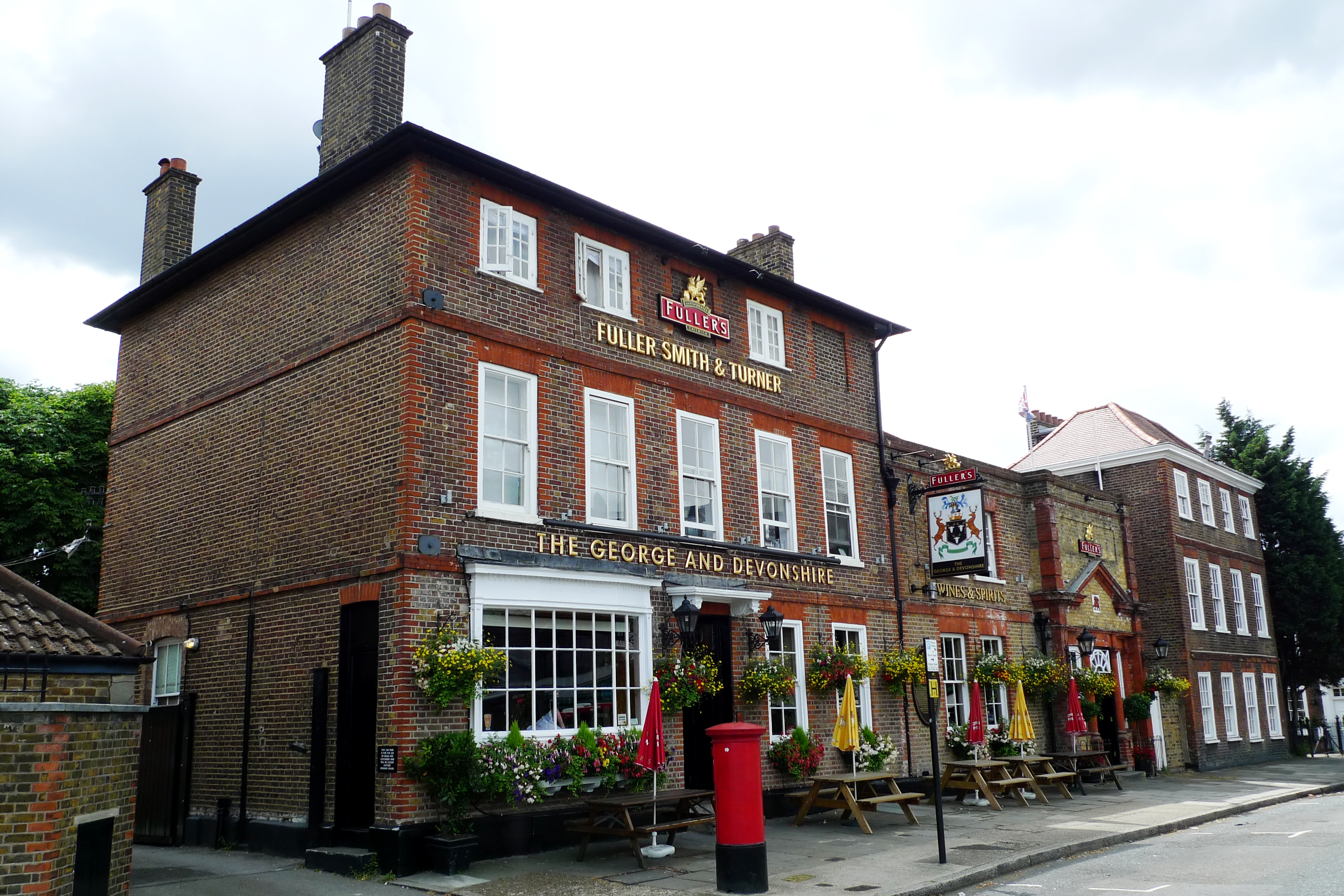
The George and Devonshire in 2010

The George and Devonshire is a Grade II listed public house at Burlington Lane, Chiswick, London. It was built in the 18th century, but the architect is not known. The pub claims that it dates back to 1650.

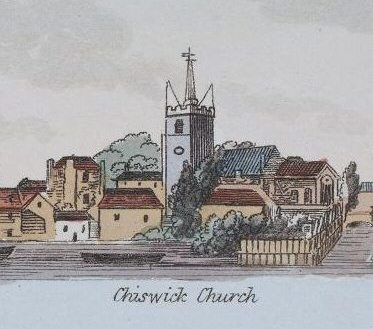
Legend tells that smugglers used a secret passage between the pub and the cottages of Slut's Hole below Chiswick Church. Detail from 1829 panorama of the river

In the 17th century, the pub on this site was named "The George", probably after Saint George, England's patron saint. John Thompson's brewery, forerunner of the nearby Griffin Brewery, acquired the building in 1791. By 1826, the pub had been renamed to "The George and Devonshire", after the Duke of Devonshire who owned the nearby Chiswick House. It is his coat of arms that now adorns the building. The pub is the last in the former Old Chiswick village by the river Thames.

A legend tells that smugglers of rum had a secret passageway from the pub's cellar to the cottages that once lined the Thames below St Nicholas Church.

The pub serves beer from the Griffin Brewery next door.
