= Hogarth House =

Hogarth House may refer to:

- Hogarth's House, the former country home of 18th-century English artist William Hogarth, Chiswick, England
- Hogarth House, the former site of Hogarth Press, founded by Leonard and Virginia Woolf, London, England
