= Plague, Poverty and Prayer: A Horrid History with Terry Deary =

Exhibition about health issues in medieval Europe

Plague, Poverty and Prayer: A Horrid History with Terry Deary is an exhibition about health issues in medieval Europe. It was developed by the Horrible Histories franchise. The exhibition explores everyday life for the citizens of York from the Norman invasion of England to Tudor times, including the examination of archaeological evidence from the period.

== Background and Development ==
The "Horrible Histories" franchise has become known for making history accessible and engaging through its focus on the gruesome and fascinating details of the past. The exhibition project was funded by the Wellcome Trust and designed by York Archaeological Trust. The exhibition represents a continuation of the Horrible Histories approach to education, combining entertainment with historical accuracy to engage audiences with medieval history.

== Terry Deary ==
William Terence Deary (born 3 January 1946) is the British children's author behind the Horrible Histories series. The book series began with "Terrible Tudors" and "Awesome Egyptians". It has sold 30 million books translated into 40 different languages. The series is popular among children for its interesting details, vast information, and humorous pictures, while adults appreciate its ability to get children interested in history.

The book series overlaps with the exhibition to some extent. "The Measly Middle Ages" explores medieval medicine and the various misguided attempts to cure the plague, including bizarre remedies such as sitting in sewers, eating arsenic powder, and strapping shaved chickens to plague sores.

Deary has explored medieval medicine and the Black Death in other works within the Horrible Histories universe. His book "Plague and Peril" (part of the Horrible Histories Gory Stories series) is set in 1348 during the Black Death's arrival in England. The story follows Geoffrey Copton returning from war in France, only to become involved in a plot to rob and kill an innocent man. Deary has also published several editions of a "gruesome guide" to York.

== Exhibition Content ==
=== Archaeological Evidence ===
The exhibition featured significant archaeological findings from medieval York, including the skeleton of a woman with leprosy that had been excavated in the city. These skeletal materials provided visitors with direct physical evidence of the diseases and health conditions that affected medieval populations.

=== Medical and Spiritual Practices ===
The exhibition examined not only illnesses and diseases from the period but also explored who and what may have treated them.

The exhibition highlighted the importance of various healing approaches in medieval society, including folk medicine, prayer, astrology, spells, and mysticism. This comprehensive approach provided visitors with insights into how medieval people understood and attempted to treat illness, combining both practical medical knowledge and spiritual beliefs of the time.

== Venue and Display ==
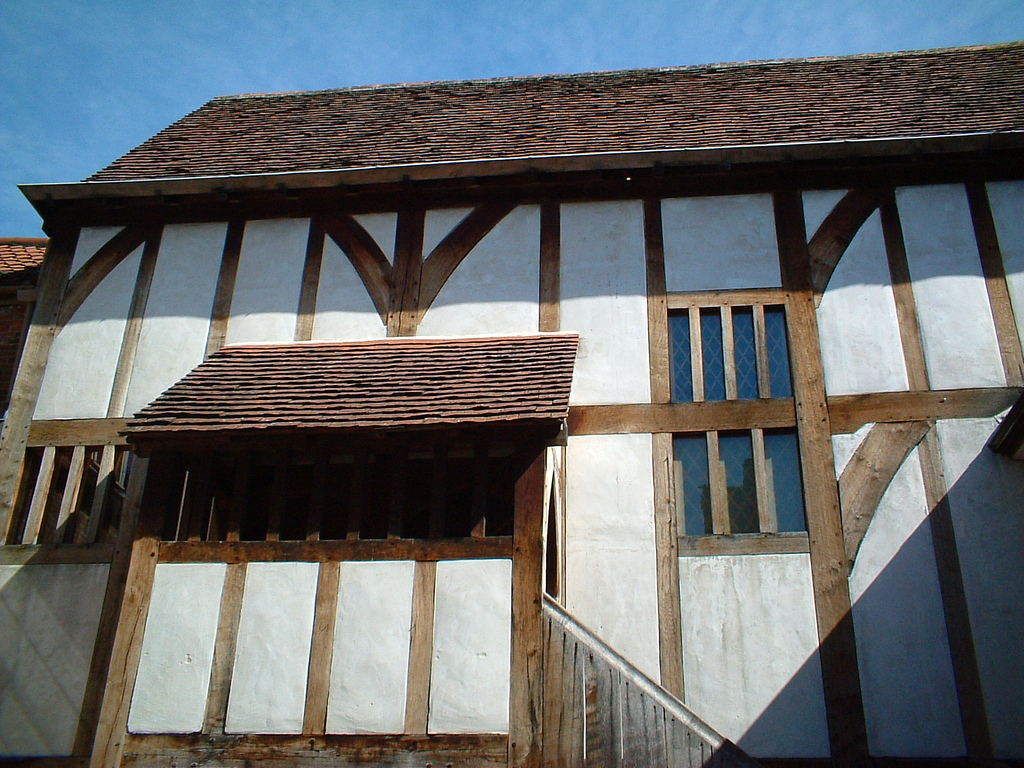
Barley Hall

What was described as an updated version of the exhibition went on display in 2013 at Barley Hall in York. Plague, Poverty and Prayer incorporated interactive displays that allowed visitors to explore various aspects of medieval health and medicine.

While the setting of Barley Hall enhanced the immersive experience of the exhibition, some people have argued that the building has been over restored to the extent of representing an imaginary and commodified past. It is a classic case of the tension between conservation, interpretation, and public engagement. Barley Hall is a Grade II medieval timber-framed building. After suffering significant neglect prior to its acquisition by the York Archaeological Trust, the building underwent partial reconstruction circa 1990 by McCurdy & Co., specialists in timber-framed buildings, with the intention of restoring its 15th-century appearance. The reconstruction went beyond "conservative restoration" as recommended by Historic England for conservation and restoration.

== Theatrical Adaptation ==
Deary joined the Theatre Powys drama company in 1972, touring Welsh village halls to bring theatre to children.

In addition to the exhibition Plague, Poverty and Prayer, Deary was involved in creating a theatrical play with the same title. This theatrical version was previewed in the Scottish press in 2013.

== Other Exhibitions ==
Plague, Poverty and Prayer was one of several Horrible Histories exhibitions, joining others such as:

- Horrible Histories: Funfair of Fear (2000)
- The Horrible Histories: Crime and Punishment exhibition at the Royal Armouries Museum in Leeds (2007)
- Horrible Histories: Frightful First World War (2008)
- Horrible Histories: Terrible Trenches (2009)
- Horrible Histories: Spies (2013)

== Legacy and Educational Impact ==
The exhibition represents the Horrible Histories approach of combining education with entertainment, making potentially dry historical topics engaging through focus on the more gruesome and fascinating aspects of the past. By presenting archaeological evidence alongside interactive displays, Plague, Poverty and Prayer provided visitors with a comprehensive understanding of medieval health, disease, and healing practices while maintaining the franchise's signature blend of humor and historical accuracy.
