= William Snawsell =

English goldsmith and mayor

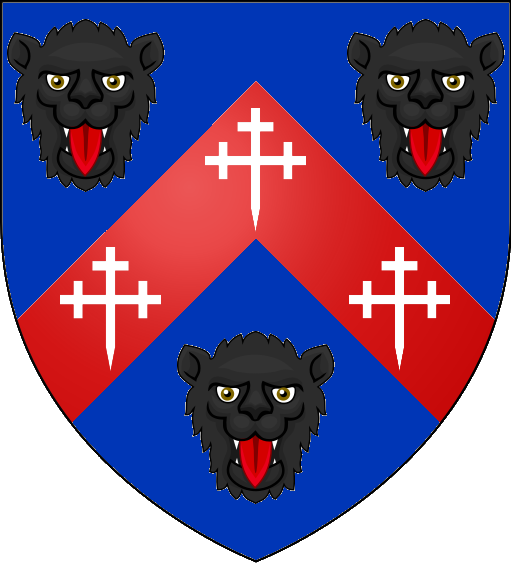
Coat of Arms of William Snawsell of Bilton

William Snawsell (or Snawsall, Snawshill, Snowsell, or Snawschill, 1415–1493/94) was a goldsmith and Mayor of York, who represented York in the 1470–71 Parliament. Little is known of his early life or career, except for a brush with the law during a major local feud, but he is known to have become a wealthy man. As well as holding several important civic offices, he is known to have met Richard, Duke of Gloucester both before and after the latter's accession to the throne as Richard III.

Snawsell appears to have experienced some degree of domestic strife early in the 1440s, with several members of his staff—and his wife—all being summonsed to the ecclesiastical court to answer charges of adultery, although not with him. In spite of this, he is known to have had three children with his wife. His house, which he rented from the York Minster, was re-imagined in the late 1980s and reconstructed as it is thought to have looked in 1483.

== Early life ==
According to Josiah Wedgwood, in The History of Parliament, Snawsell was born in 1414. Later known as "of York" and "of Bilton", little is known of his early life except that he was a younger son of William Snawsell, a goldsmith, and his wife Margaret. Snawsell the younger became a freeman of York—per patres, or "by patrimony" (Note: I.e., he automatically qualified for his freedom on account of his father being a freeman already.)—in 1436, when he reached his majority. His father died the following year. Snawsell practiced as a goldsmith and coiner. At some point he was master of the mint at York. What is thought to have been his residence, Barley Hall—which he leased in 1466 Barley Hall has been reconstructed and decorated to replicate what it would have looked like as the Snawsell home around 1483 and is open to the public. According to the historian Richard Britnell it was probably a half-timbered construction surrounding a courtyard on three sides, the great hall in the middle with an housing wing either side. It had previously served as accommodation for Nostell Priory, and although Snawsell appears to have added the Great Hall, its living quarters were cramped, if with "opulent" furnishing." (Note: The building was not known as Barley hall to contemporaries; it was named thusly following its reconstruction by the York Archaeological Trust, which was opened in 1992. It was named after Professor Maurice Barley, "doyen of vernacular building studies" and chairman of the Trust, who had died the year before.)

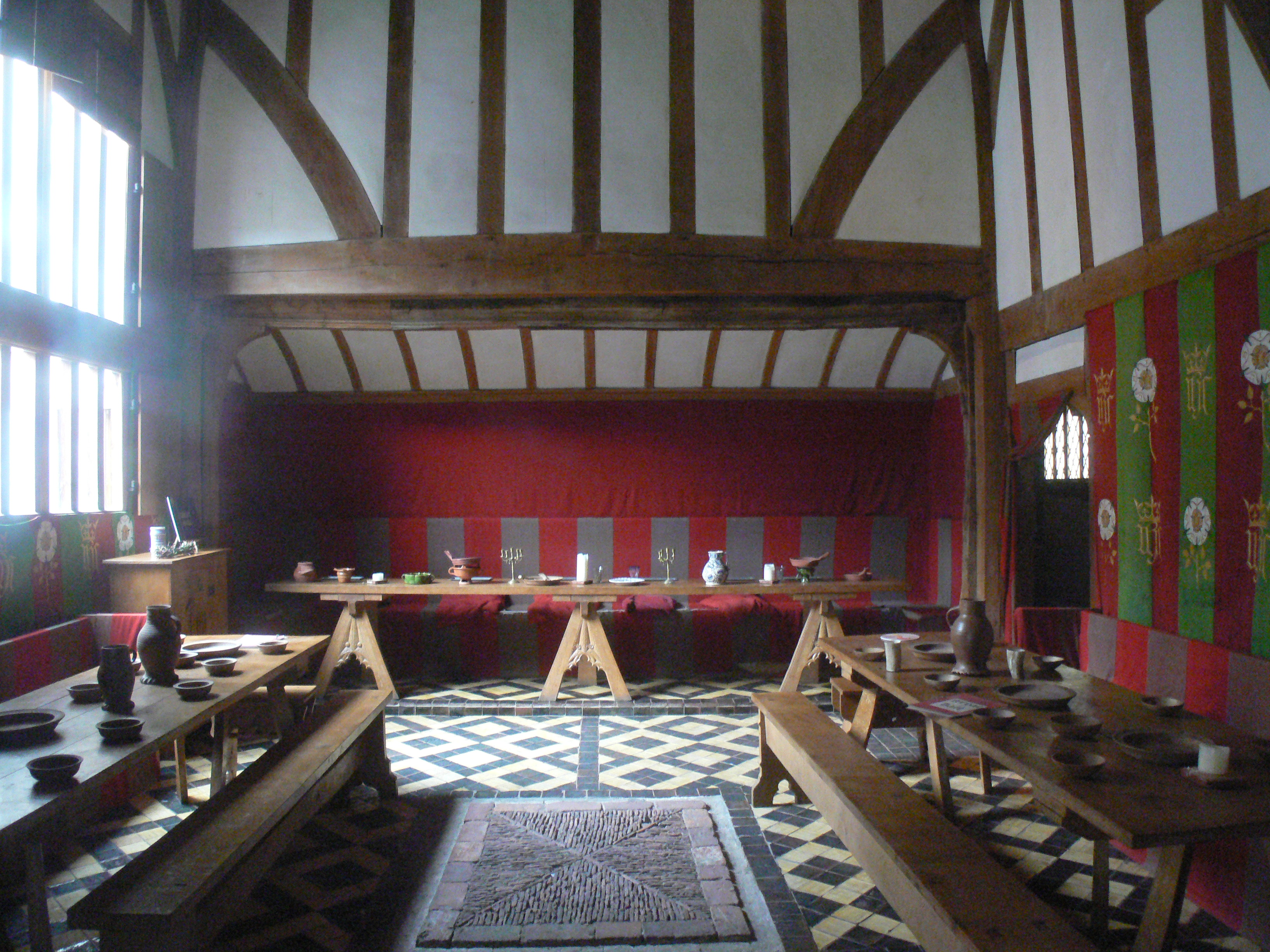
The reconstructed Great Hall of Barley Hall, something similar to which was probably added by Snawsell during his residency.

Snawsell took part in the major feud which occurred in the early years of the 1450s in Yorkshire between the important local families, the Percys and the Nevilles. In 1454 he was indicted in York for taking part in Thomas Percy's ambush of the Nevilles—who were returning from the wedding of Sir Thomas Neville—at Heworth the previous year. The historian Ralph Griffiths says he "emerged unscathed" from the crisis, and his position was not "adversely" affected.

== Civic office ==
In 1455, Snawsell and his wife entered the York Corpus Christi guild, and two years later he opened his shop outside the main door of York Minster, for which he paid the cathedral chapter 18 shillings. He joined the Merchants' guild six years later. He was elected Chamberlain of the city in 1459, sheriff in 1464–65, and Mayor and Alderman in 1468. While sheriff he and his colleague, Sir Edward Hastings, frequently bickered over who was to sign their name on writs and records. The same year two of his servants were presented to the city's Corpus Christi guild, probably at his behest; this would have expanded his entourage—and so his status—when on official business. When the Lancastrian parliament was summoned in October 1470 following Henry VI's return to power, Snawsell was named one of the burgesses for the town. In 1471, he was given a general pardon along with other members of the Parliament. This was the fourth pardon he had received since 1458.

Snawsell, as well as being wealthy, was a socially and politically important figure in York, shown by his being allowed to wear crimson on civic occasions and being preceded by a mace-bearer when appearing in public. In 1476 he was fined 6s. 8d. for withdrawing from Council having already been warned for it. He acted occasionally as an emissary of the city to Richard of Gloucester when the duke resided at Middleham Castle, which included taking gifts of food and drink—including to Gloucester and his family. Following the accession of Gloucester to the throne in 1483 as King Richard III, Snowsall was a member of the City Council which greeted the new king outside the city walls."

== Later life ==
In 1492 he resigned his council duties due to impoverishment and illness, being "greatly diseased and vexed with many and diverse sicknesses". The historian Jennifer Kermode has argued that York city council enforced strong penalties on aldermen who failed to regularly attend, and suggests that, as well as being a medical necessity, his retirement may well have been down to "increasing exasperation with colleagues". He died at some point between September 1493 and January 1495.

== Family ==
Snawsell had married Jane (or Jenet) Thweng, daughter of John Thweng of Heworth by 1455, and left a son, Seth, who in 1483 followed his father in goldsmithing and was an associate of the political polemicist Wilfred Holme. Seth died in 1537. Snawsell also had two daughters, Isabella, who married John of Huntington (d.1490), and Alice.

Snawsell's coat of arms comprised azure, on a chevron gules between three pards heads sable three crosses crosslet fitchée argent. When Seth married Elizabeth, daughter and heir of William Davell—one of Snawsell's fellow aldermen of Bilton, he quartered her arms.

=== Household shenanigans ===
Snawsnell's household has been described as "dangerously dysfunctional" and unhappy. The historian Paul Goldberg says that that Snawsnell's domestic situation was only "superficially orthodox". In fact, he argues, Snawsell presided over a household where the servants, both male and female, were presented for fornication both with others and with each other". In 1442 his servant, one John Smith, was accused at an ecclesiastical court of fornicating with an Isabella Atkynson, and also with a fellow servant called Isabella. Another of Snawsell's maids, Alice, was accused in court of having sex with a vicar choral of the York Minster. One of the most common causes for presentment, or summons, to a commissary court was fornication—not just adultery—with a servant. Goldberg concludes that Snawsnell was "evidently an unsatisfactory master" to his staff, but that his entire household was affected is demonstrated by the fact that in 1444 his wife, Joan, was also accused in the same court of adultery with one John Kendall, even though she, as the mistress of the household, was meant to set an example to the female staff. Goldberg argues that Snawsell was partly to blame for not controlling his dependents, and while his own household most obviously affected, his lack of control—"impotent headship"—could potentially undermine other implicated households. It was accepted that there were likely damaging consequences to local society, for "unchecked, the canker could spread more widely"; (Note: Goldberg's underlying thesis is that Snawsell failed in his social duty to maintain patriarchal authority by sufficiently controlling the sexual activities on his female householders, whether wife or servants. The medievalist R. H. Helmholz notes household were often prosecuted for failing to prevent sexual licentiousness on their premisses, and that, even before the Puritans, and that "the offense had a long history by 1600".) in the case of the Snawsell household, it is possible that it was his own neighbours who reported on the goings-on.

== Popular culture ==
Barley Hall is open to the public everyday 10:00 AM - 4:30 PM. There is currently an exhibition on medieval beasts and guided tours subject to availability.

Barley Hall used to operate a self-guided tour system, whereby visitors are led by means of an audiotape. This was dictated by the actors Robert Hardy and Judi Dench as Sir William and Lady Snawsell respectively, describing their daily lives, with a medieval market and banquet.
