= Hogarth's House =

Building in London

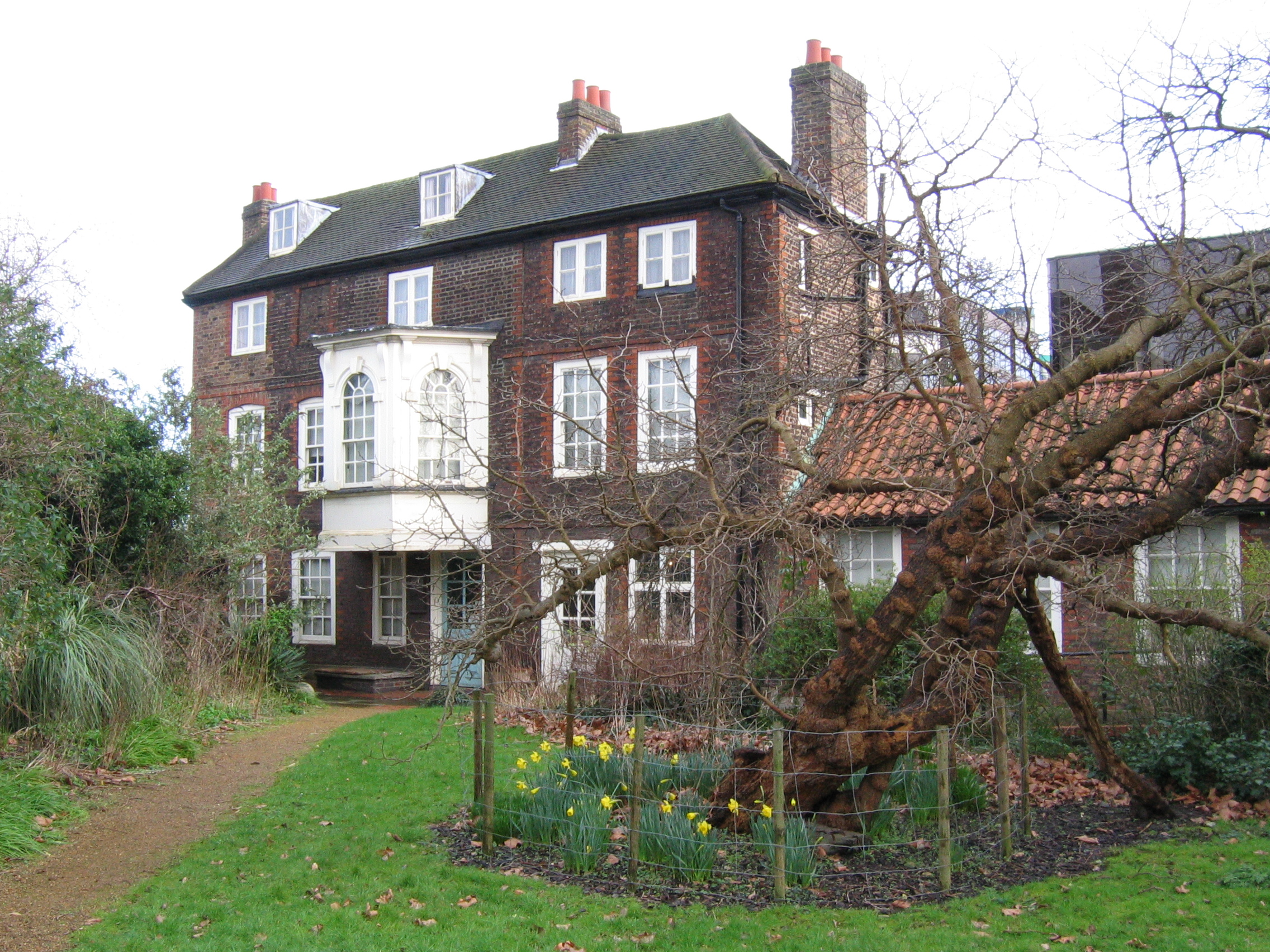
- Hogarth's House. The tree in front is a mulberry which was present in Hogarth's time, and has some local fame

- Location within London Borough of Hounslow
- 51°29′13″N 0°15′18″W
- Location: Chiswick
- OS grid reference: TQ 21250 77891

History
- Built: 1713 - 1717

Site notes
- Area: London Borough of Hounslow
- Owner: London Borough of Hounslow

Listed Building – Grade I
- Official name: Hogarths House, Wall and Gate of Hogarths House
- Designated: 11 June 1951
- Reference no.: 1358340

Hogarth's House is the former country home of the 18th-century English artist William Hogarth in Chiswick, adjacent to the A4. The House now belongs to the London Borough of Hounslow and is open to visitors as a historic house museum free of charge. Chiswick is now one of London's western suburbs, but in the 18th century it was a large village or small town quite separate from the metropolis, but within easy reach of it. Today the house is a Grade I listed building.

== Construction and early occupation ==
The house was built between 1713 and 1717 in the corner of an orchard belonging to the Downes family. Its first occupant was Rev George Andreas Ruperti, the pastor of St Mary's Lutheran church in the Savoy, London, who used it as his country home. He cared for the thousands of refugees from the Rhineland who arrived in London following a famine in 1708–9. They hoped to be able to reach America - with Ruperti's help many did, and some settled in the south of Ireland. Ruperti's lists of the refugees, which record their trades, have been invaluable to family historians. He was appointed to the Lutheran Church at St James's Palace in 1728 at a salary of £200 a year. After his death in 1731 his widow retained the House; the Hogarths bought it from his son in 1749.

According to the increased valuations in the parish rate books, the Hogarths extended it in 1750 and Mrs Hogarth added another single storey extension in 1769. It was the artist's country retreat from 1749 until his death in 1764; he had a "painting room" over his coach-house at the bottom of the garden. He shared it with his wife, mother-in-law, his wife's cousin, Mary Lewis (who assisted with his business), and his sister. William Hogarth is buried in the graveyard of the nearby St. Nicholas Church, Chiswick; his fine tomb-monument carries an obituary by his great friend, the actor David Garrick. The family's connections with the house continued until Mary Lewis' death in 1808.

From 1814 to 1833 the house belonged to Rev Henry Francis Cary, a poet and skilful translator of Dante's Divine Comedy. He came to Chiswick as Curate of St Nicholas' Church and went on to become Assistant Librarian at the British Museum. He was part of a circle of writers and poets, including Samuel Taylor Coleridge, who promoted Cary's Dante translation and made it a best seller. The House was acquired in 1833 by the Wickstead family; they migrated to Australia in 1840 and left the house to tenants.

== Restoration and museum ==
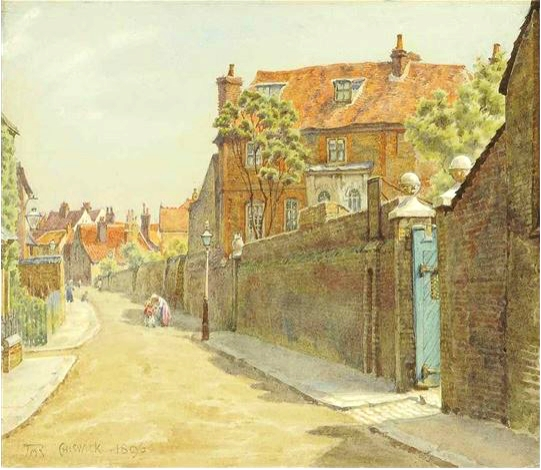
Hogarth's House, watercolour by Thomas Matthews Rooke, 1896

Alfred Dawson, whose family home at The Cedars adjoined Hogarth's and whose printing works was nearby, rescued the House in 1890 and restored it. He leased it to a nursery gardener along with part of his own garden. However, he sold it in 1900 and it was put up for auction for re-development in 1901. A campaign by artists and writers failed to raise sufficient funds to buy the House but it was purchased by Lieutenant-Colonel Robert William Shipway of Grove House, Chiswick. He restored it with the help of the architect Frederick William Peel and Henry Austin Dobson, Hogarth's biographer. He provided a collection of Hogarth's works, commissioned replica furniture based on pieces in Hogarth prints and even took the photographs for the first guide book himself. He opened it to visitors in 1904. Shipway gave the house to Middlesex County Council in 1909 and ownership passed to Hounslow Council when Middlesex was abolished in 1965.

The house was damaged in September 1940 as a result of a parachute mine explosion nearby during World War II. It was repaired and re-opened in 1951. At that time the single-storey extension was completely rebuilt to provide a small exhibition room. The interior of the House was refurbished for the Hogarth Tercentenary in 1997.

In 2014 the William Hogarth Trust commissioned a special exhibition to be held at the museum to mark the 250th anniversary of Hogarth's death. This exhibition featured artwork submissions from over fifty artists and celebrities in tribute to Hogarth including works by Quentin Blake, Harry Hill, Jacqueline Wilson, Cath Kidston, Peter Blake and Joanna Lumley.

== Refurbishment ==
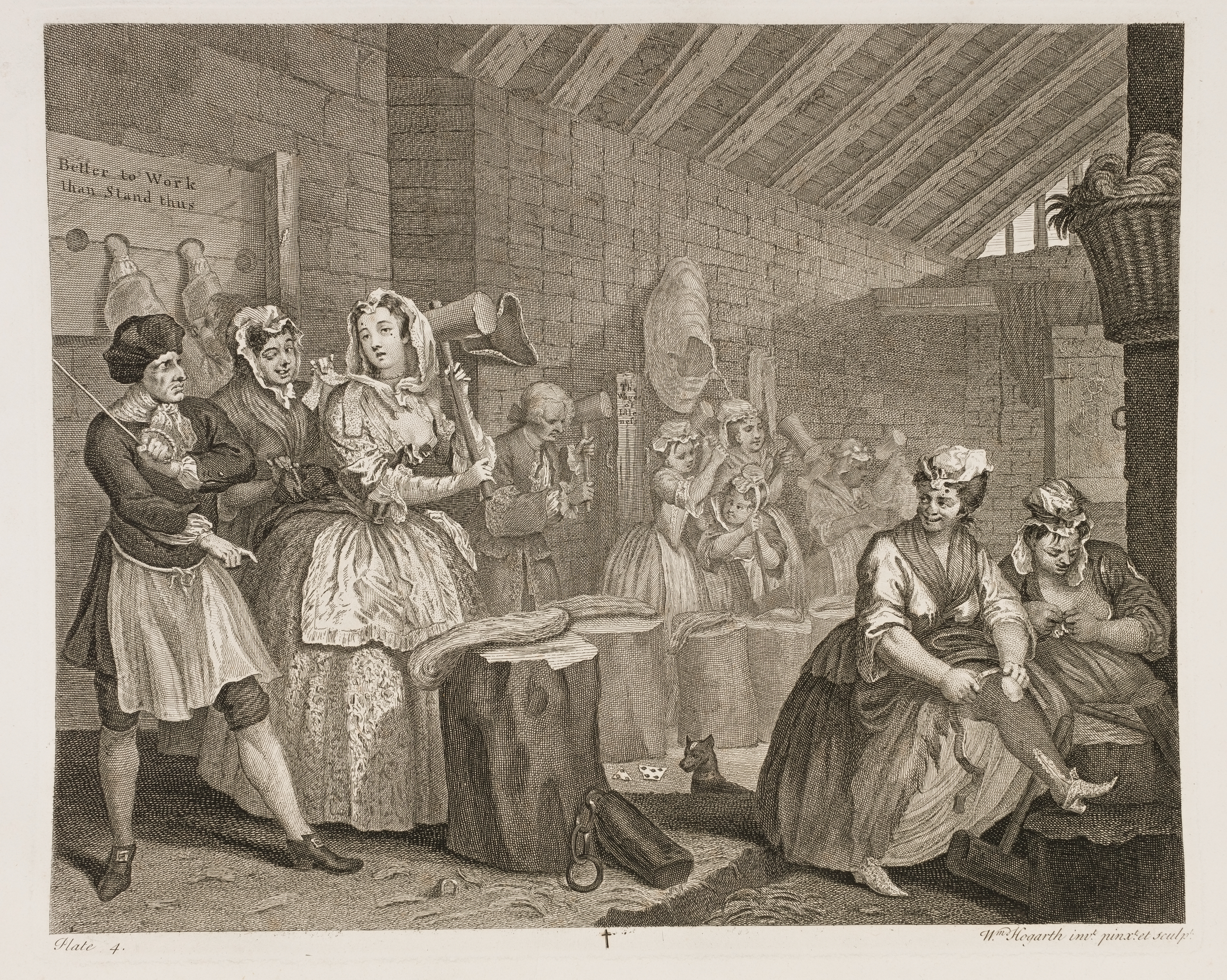
Some of Hogarth's best-known engravings in the house: A Harlot's Progress, plate 4. Moll, still dressed in her finery, works with other inmates of Bridewell prison. 1732

The house closed for refurbishment in September 2008.

=== Fire ===
On 14 August 2009, there was a fire in the house, which was empty. No furnishings or prints were lost, but the staircase and one room were badly damaged and other areas suffered from smoke damage and the effects of the water which doused the flames. The entire structure was carefully restored and a major research project carried out on the history of the House and its occupants. A paint analysis informed the re-decoration, and original features were repaired and revealed, including window shutters, fire surrounds and hearths, and two areas of original floorboards.

The Heritage Lottery Fund, the John & Ruth Howard Charitable Trust and the William Hogarth Trust supported the London Borough of Hounslow in this project with grants and expert advice. Negotiations over insurance and the requirement for complete rewiring, as well as structural repairs, delayed the re-opening.

=== Re-opening ===
The museum was officially re-opened on 8 November 2011 by Dara Ó Briain. Two floors of the house are open to visitors and the top floor houses a study/research room for use by appointment. The furnishing includes Shipway's replica pieces and new displays presents the House as a home, as well as celebrating Hogarth's life and work. Prints of some of his best known engravings are on display, including the series A Harlot's Progress, A Rake's Progress and Marriage à-la-mode.

The House has an attractive walled garden which contains a mulberry tree. This is probably the last survivor of the original orchard established in the 1670s. It was damaged by the parachute mine and brought back to good health by arboriculturists from Kew Gardens.

== See also ==
- List of single-artist museums
