= Chiswick =

Riverside district of London, England

Coordinates: 51.49°N 0.26°W

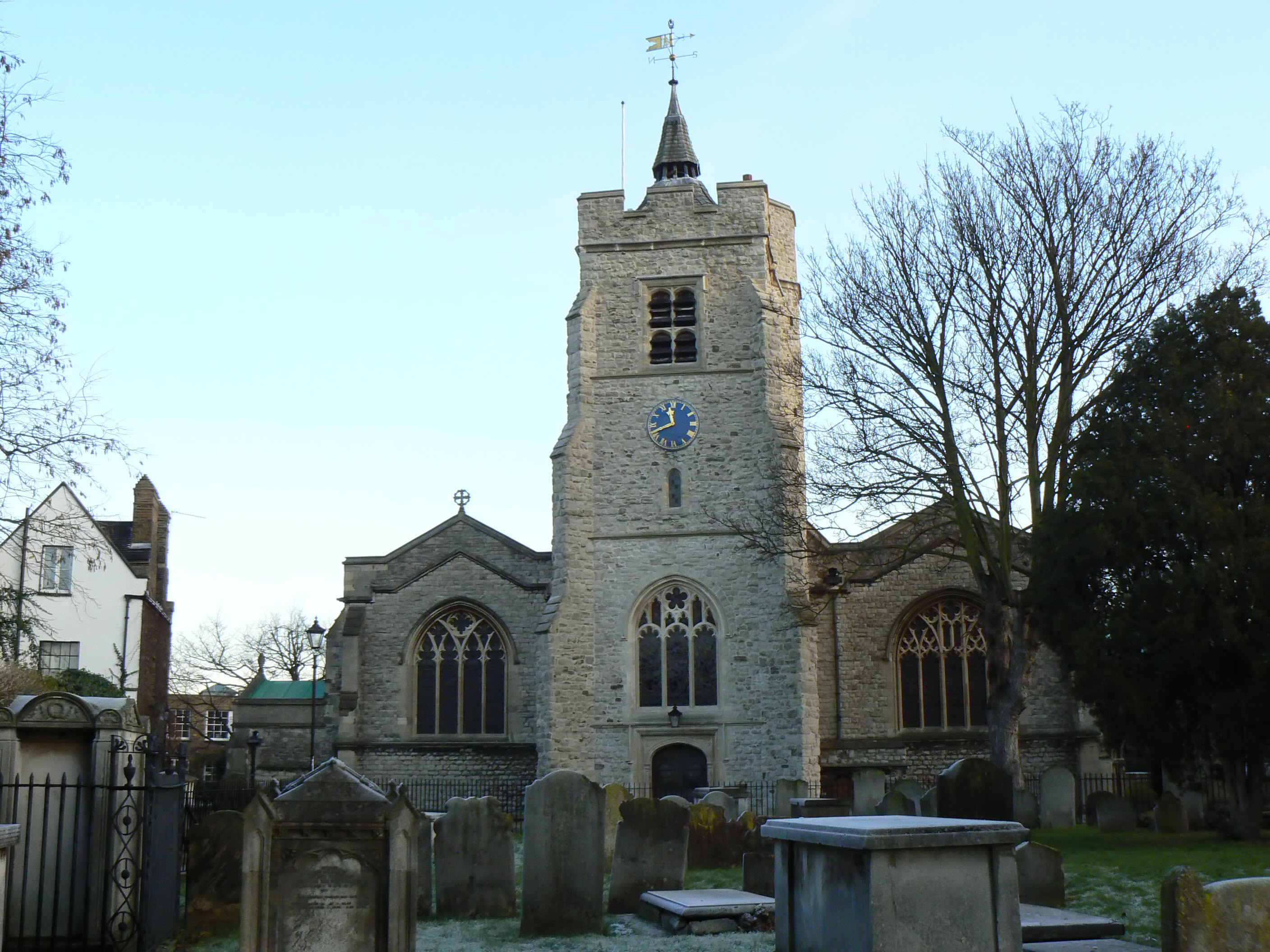
- St Nicholas Church

- Location within Greater London
- Area: 5.72 km^{2} (2.21 sq mi)
- Population: 34,337 (Chiswick Homefields, Chiswick Riverside, Turnham Green wards 2011)
  - Density: 6,003/km^{2} (15,550/sq mi)
- OS grid reference: TQ205785
  - Charing Cross: 6 mi (9.7 km) E
- London borough: Hounslow; Ealing
- Ceremonial county: Greater London
- Region: London
- Country: England
- Sovereign state: United Kingdom
- Post town: LONDON
- Postcode district: W4
- Dialling code: 020
- Police: Metropolitan
- Fire: London
- Ambulance: London
- UK Parliament: Hammersmith and Chiswick
- London Assembly: South West; Ealing and Hillingdon

Chiswick (/ˈtʃɪzɪk/ CHIZ-ik) is a district in West London, split between the London boroughs of Hounslow and Ealing. It contains Hogarth's House, the former residence of the 18th-century English artist William Hogarth, Chiswick House, a neo-Palladian villa regarded as one of the finest in England and Fuller's Brewery, London's largest and oldest brewery. In a meander of the River Thames used for competitive and recreational rowing, with several rowing clubs on the river bank, the finishing post for the Boat Race is just downstream of Chiswick Bridge.

Old Chiswick was an ancient parish in the county of Middlesex, with an agrarian and fishing economy beside the river; from the Early Modern period, the wealthy built imposing riverside houses on Chiswick Mall. Having good communications with London, Chiswick became a popular country retreat and part of the suburban growth of London in the late 19th and early 20th centuries. It was made the Municipal Borough of Brentford and Chiswick in 1932 and part of Greater London in 1965, when it merged into the London Borough of Hounslow. Modern Chiswick is an affluent area which includes the early garden suburb Bedford Park, Grove Park, the Glebe Estate, Strand-on-the-Green and tube stations Chiswick Park, Turnham Green, Gunnersbury and Stamford Brook, as well as the Gunnersbury Triangle local nature reserve. Some parts of Bedford Park and Acton Green are in the Chiswick W4 postcode area but the London Borough of Ealing. The main shopping and dining centre is Chiswick High Road.

Chiswick Roundabout is the start of the North Circular Road (A406). At Hogarth Roundabout, the Great West Road from central London becomes the M4 motorway, while the Great Chertsey Road (A316) runs south-west, becoming the M3 motorway.

People who have lived in Chiswick include the poets Alexander Pope and W. B. Yeats, the Italian poet and revolutionary Ugo Foscolo, the painters Vincent van Gogh and Camille Pissarro, the novelist E. M. Forster, the rock musicians Pete Townshend, John Entwistle, and Phil Collins, the stage director Peter Brook, and the actress Imogen Poots.

== History ==
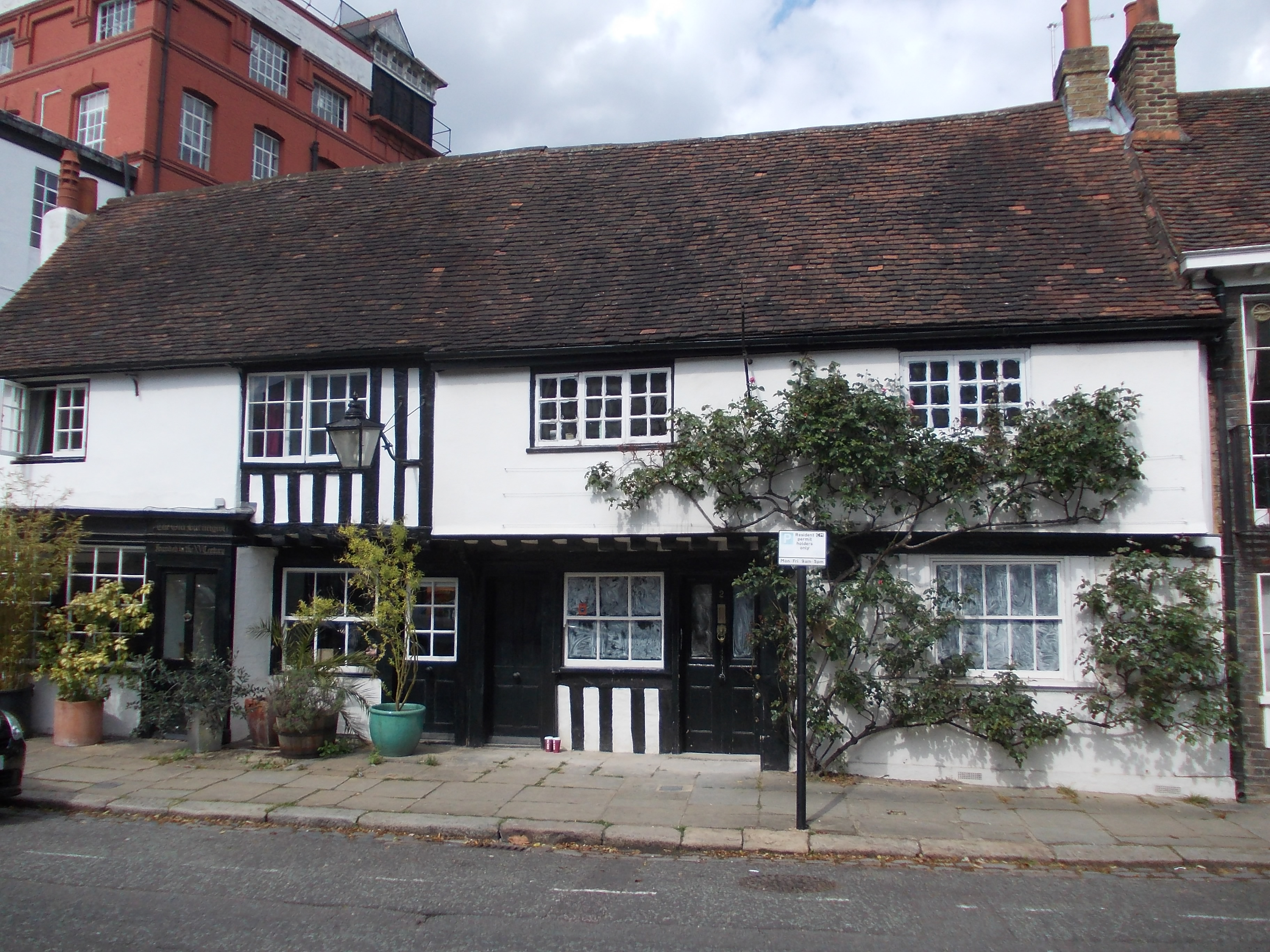
Old Chiswick: the fifteenth-century Old Burlington, one of two former pubs on Church Street, Chiswick. The tower of the former Lamb Brewery is behind it on the left.

Chiswick was first recorded c. 1000 as the Old English Ceswican meaning 'Cheese Farm'; the riverside area of Duke's Meadows is thought to have supported an annual cheese fair up until the 18th century. The area was settled in Roman times; an urn found at Turnham Green contained Roman coins, and Roman brickwork was found under the Sutton manor house.

Old Chiswick grew up as a village around St Nicholas Church from c. 1181 on Church Street, its inhabitants practising farming, fishing and other riverside trades including a ferry, important as there were no bridges between London Bridge and Kingston throughout the Middle Ages. The area included three other small settlements, the fishing village of Strand-on-the-Green, the hamlet of Little Sutton in the centre, and Turnham Green on the west road out of London.

A decisive skirmish took place on Turnham Green early in the English Civil War. In November 1642, royalist forces under Prince Rupert, marching from Oxford to retake London, were halted by a larger parliamentarian force under the Earl of Essex. The royalists retreated and never again threatened the capital.

From 1758 until 1929 the Dukes of Devonshire owned Chiswick House, and their legacy can be found in street names all over Chiswick. (Note: There are streets named after their title (Duke Road, Dukes Avenue, Devonshire Road, Devonshire Gardens); their surname (Cavendish Road); their courtesy titles (Hartington Road, Burlington Lane); their estates (Chatsworth Road, Bolton Road); and the village on their main estate (Edensor Road).)

In 1864, John Isaac Thornycroft, founder of the John I. Thornycroft & Company shipbuilding company, established a yard at Church Wharf at the west end of Chiswick Mall. The shipyard built the first naval destroyer, HMS Daring of the Daring class, in 1893. To cater for the increasing size of warships, Thornycroft moved its shipyard to Southampton in 1909.

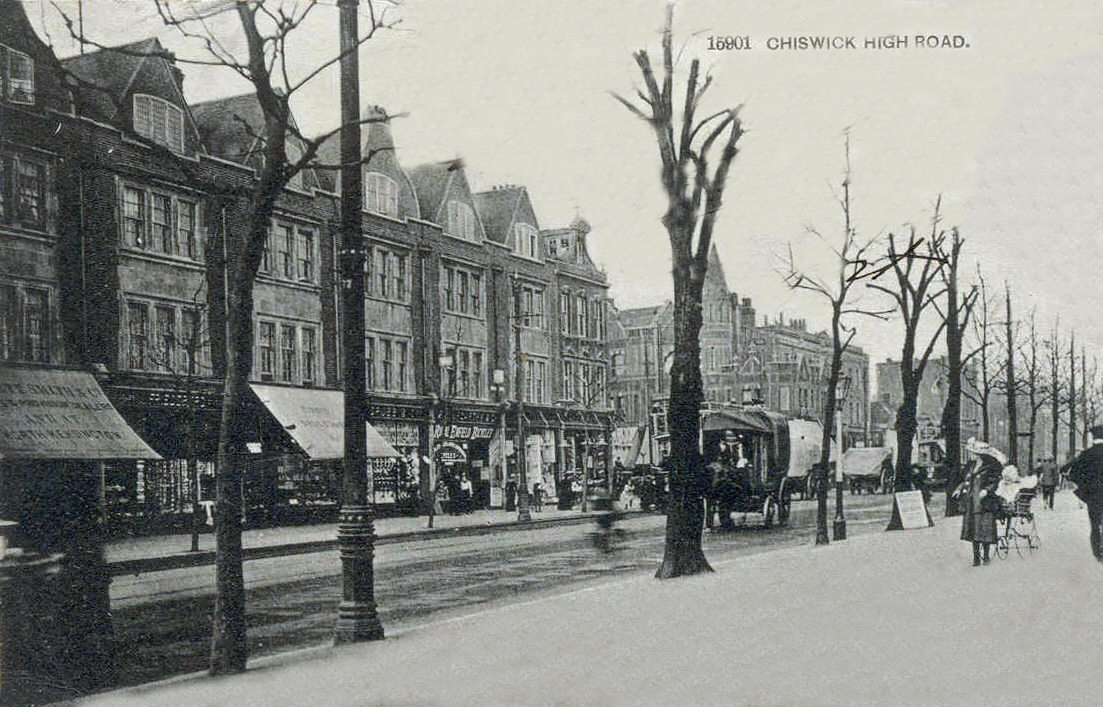
Postcard photo of Chiswick High Road and King Street, Hammersmith, c. 1900

In 1822, the Royal Horticultural Society leased 33 acres (13.4 ha) of land in the area south of the High Road between what are now Sutton Court Road and Duke's Avenue. This site was used for its fruit tree collection and its first school of horticulture, and housed its first flower shows. The area was reduced to 10 acres (4.0 ha) in the 1870s, and the lease was terminated when the Society's garden at Wisley, Surrey, was set up in 1904. Some of the original pear trees still grow in the gardens of houses built on the site.

The population of Chiswick grew almost tenfold during the 19th century, reaching 29,809 in 1901, and the area is a mixture of Georgian, Victorian and Edwardian housing. Suburban building began in Gunnersbury in the 1860s and in Bedford Park, the first garden suburb, on the borders of Chiswick and Acton, in 1875.

During the Second World War, Chiswick was bombed repeatedly, with both incendiary and high explosive bombs. Falling anti-aircraft shells and shrapnel also caused damage. The first V-2 rocket to hit London fell on Staveley Road, Chiswick, at 6.43pm on 8 September 1944, killing three people, injuring 22 others and causing extensive damage to surrounding trees and buildings. Six houses were demolished by the rocket and many more suffered damage. There is a memorial where the rocket fell on Staveley Road, and a War Memorial at the east end of Turnham Green.

Refuge was founded in 1971 in Chiswick, as the modern world's first safe house for women and children escaping domestic violence.

By the start of the 21st century, Chiswick had become an affluent suburb.

== Governance ==
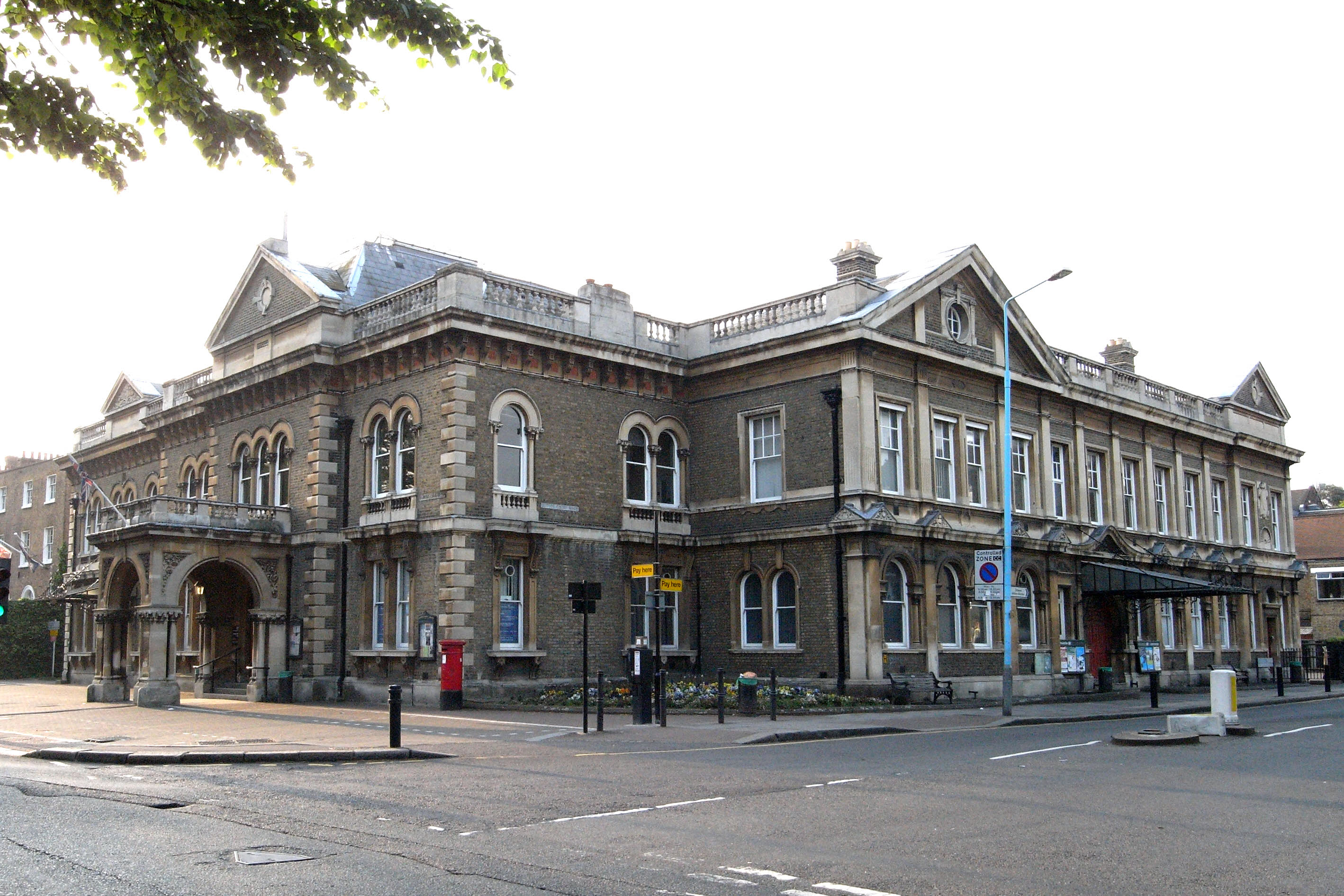
Chiswick Town Hall, designed by A. Ramsden, 1901

Chiswick is split between the London boroughs of Hounslow and Ealing. For elections to Hounslow London Borough Council, Chiswick is represented by nine councillors from three electoral wards: Chiswick Gunnersbury, Chiswick Homefields and Chiswick Riverside. Councillors serve four-year terms and since the 2022 Hounslow election, eight are Conservatives and one Labour. Before 2022, the electoral wards were Turnham Green, Chiswick Homefields and Chiswick Riverside. The Chiswick areas of Acton Green and Bedford Park are part of Ealing.

Chiswick forms part of the Brentford and Isleworth parliamentary constituency, having been part of the Brentford and Chiswick constituency between 1918 and 1974. The Member of Parliament (MP) is Ruth Cadbury (Labour), elected at the 2015 general election replacing Mary Macleod (Conservative).

For elections to the London Assembly, Chiswick is in the South West constituency, represented since 2024 by Gareth Roberts, of the Liberal Democrats. It was one of 35 major centres identified in the statutory planning document of Greater London, the London Plan of 2008.

Historically, Chiswick St Nicholas was an ancient parish in the Ossulstone hundred of Middlesex. Until 1834 its vestry governed most parish affairs. After the Poor Law Amendment Act (1834), local administration in Chiswick began to be devolved to authorities beyond the vestry. Then, Chiswick poor relief was administered by the Brentford Poor Law Union. Briefly, from 1849 to 1855, responsibility for Chiswick drains and sewers passed to the Metropolitan Commission of Sewers under its 'Fulham and Hammersmith Sewer District.' From 1858, under the Chiswick Improvement Act of that year, responsibility for drains and sewers, paving and lighting was vested in an elected board of eighteen Improvement Commissioners. This operated as Chiswick's secular local authority for a quarter of a century until its replacement with a Local Board in 1883. In 1878 the parish gained a triangle of land in the east which had formed a detached part of Ealing. From 1894 to 1927 the parish formed the Chiswick Urban District. In 1927 it was abolished and its former area was merged with that of Brentford Urban District to form Brentford and Chiswick Urban District. The amalgamated district became a municipal borough in 1932. The borough of Brentford and Chiswick was abolished in 1965, and its former area was transferred to Greater London to form part of the London Borough of Hounslow. With these changes, Chiswick Town Hall is no longer the local government centre but remains an approved venue for marriage and civil partnership ceremonies. On 1 April 1965 the civil parish was abolished. At the 1951 census (one of the last before the abolition of the parish), Chiswick St Nicholas had a population of 41,207.

== Geography ==
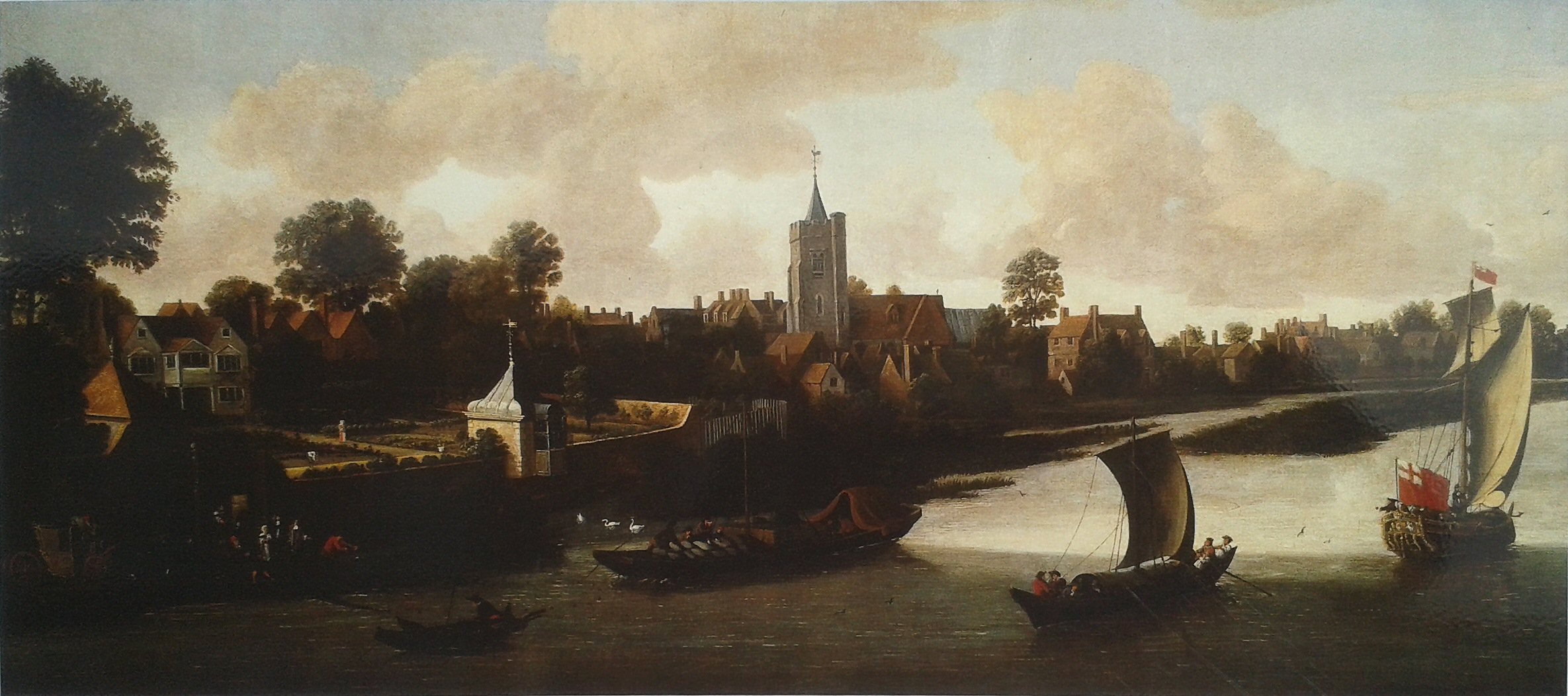
Painting Corney House in Chiswick from the River by Jacob Knyff, 1675–80. St Nicholas Church is in the centre.

Chiswick occupies a meander of the River Thames, 6 miles (9.7 km) west of Charing Cross. The district is built up towards the north with more open space in the south, including the grounds of Chiswick House and Duke's Meadows. Chiswick has one main shopping area, the Chiswick High Road, forming a long high street in the north, with additional shops on Turnham Green Terrace and Devonshire Road. The river forms the southern boundary with Kew, including North Sheen, Mortlake and Barnes in the London Borough of Richmond upon Thames. It includes the uninhabited island of Chiswick Eyot, joined to the mainland at low tide. In the east Goldhawk Road and British Grove border Hammersmith in the London Borough of Hammersmith and Fulham. In the north are Bedford Park (like Chiswick, within the London W4 postcode area) and South Acton in the London Borough of Ealing, with a boundary partially delineated by the District line. On the west, within Hounslow, are the districts of Gunnersbury, which is within the bounds of the early 19th century parish of Chiswick, and Brentford. A short distance south of the High Road in the centre of Chiswick is the Glebe Estate, consisting of small terraced houses built in the 1870s on glebe land once owned by the local church, and now a desirable place to live. Chiswick is in the W4 postcode district of the London post town, which in a tribute to its ancient parish includes Bedford Park and Acton Green, mostly within the London Borough of Ealing.

Some of the most beautiful period mansion blocks in Chiswick, such as Heathfield Court and Arlington Mansions, line the sides of Turnham Green – the site of the Battle of Turnham Green in 1642. Other suburbs of Chiswick include Grove Park (south of the A4, close to Chiswick railway station) and Strand on the Green, a fishing hamlet until the late 18th century. As early as 1896, Bedford Park was advertised as being in Chiswick, though at that time much of it was in Acton.

== Economy ==
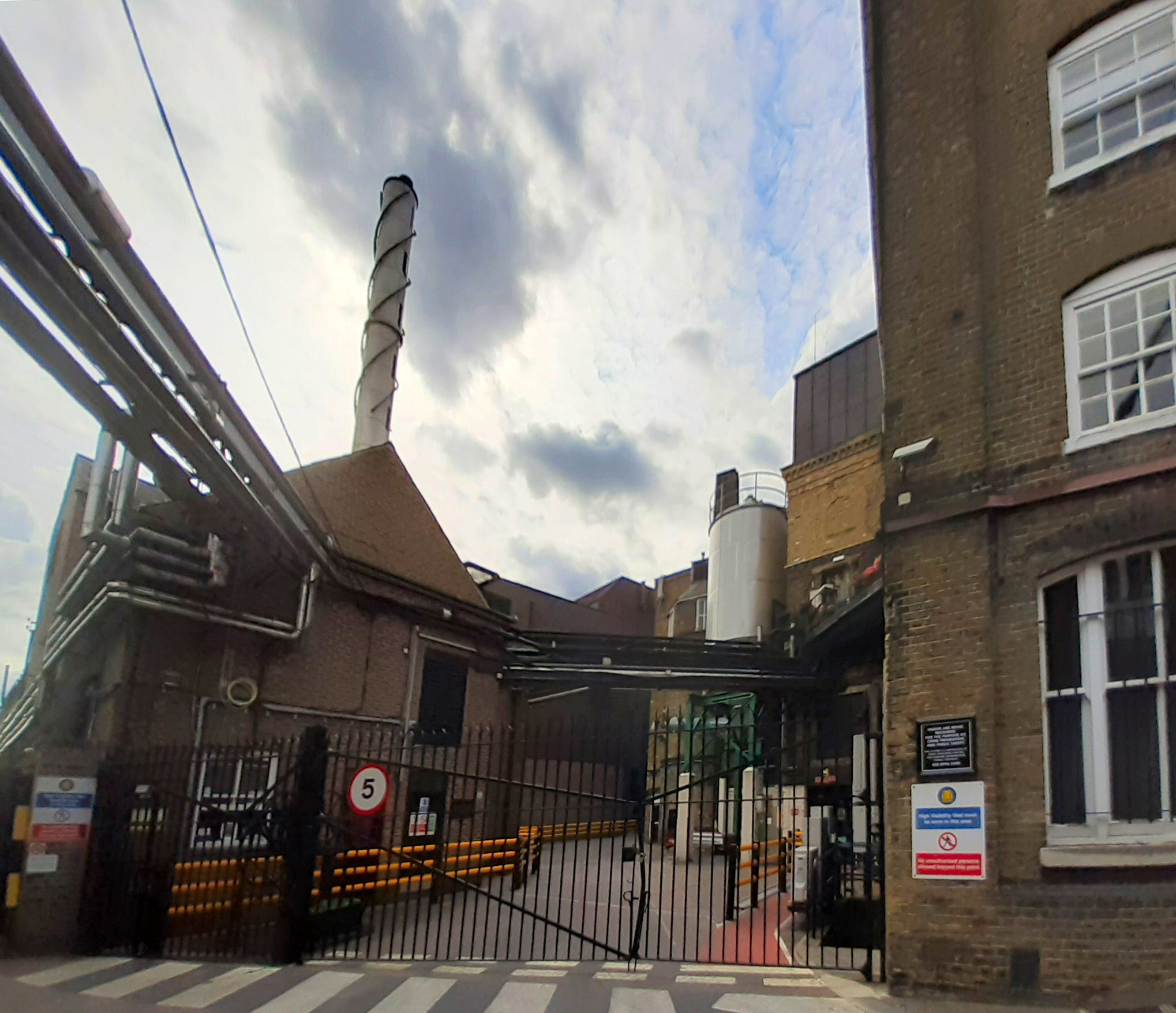
Griffin Brewery, Old Chiswick

Chiswick High Road contains a mix of retail shops, restaurants, food outlets and office and hotel space. The wide streets encourage cafes, pubs and restaurants to provide pavement seating. Lying between the offices at the Golden Mile Great West Road and Hammersmith, office developments and warehouse conversions to offices began from the 1960s. The first in 1961 was 414 Chiswick High Road on the site of the old Chiswick Empire. Between 1964 and 1966, the 18-storey IBM headquarters was built above Gunnersbury station, designed to accommodate 1500 people. It became the home of the British Standards Institution in 1994. Chiswick has an annual book festival.

Chiswick is home to the Griffin Brewery, where Fuller, Smith & Turner and its predecessor companies brewed their prize-winning ales on the same site for over 350 years. The original brewery was in the gardens of Bedford House in Chiswick Mall.

A weekly farmers' market is held every Sunday by Grove Park Farm House, Duke's Meadows. A monthly flower market is held on the first Sunday of each month on Chiswick High Road in the old market place, now mostly used as a car park, near the Hogarth statue. An antiques market is to be held on the second Sunday of each month, and a "Cheese and Provisions" market with 23 stalls on the third and fourth Sundays of each month in the same area, so there will in effect be a weekly market event on the High Road once again.

== Points of interest ==
=== Chiswick House ===
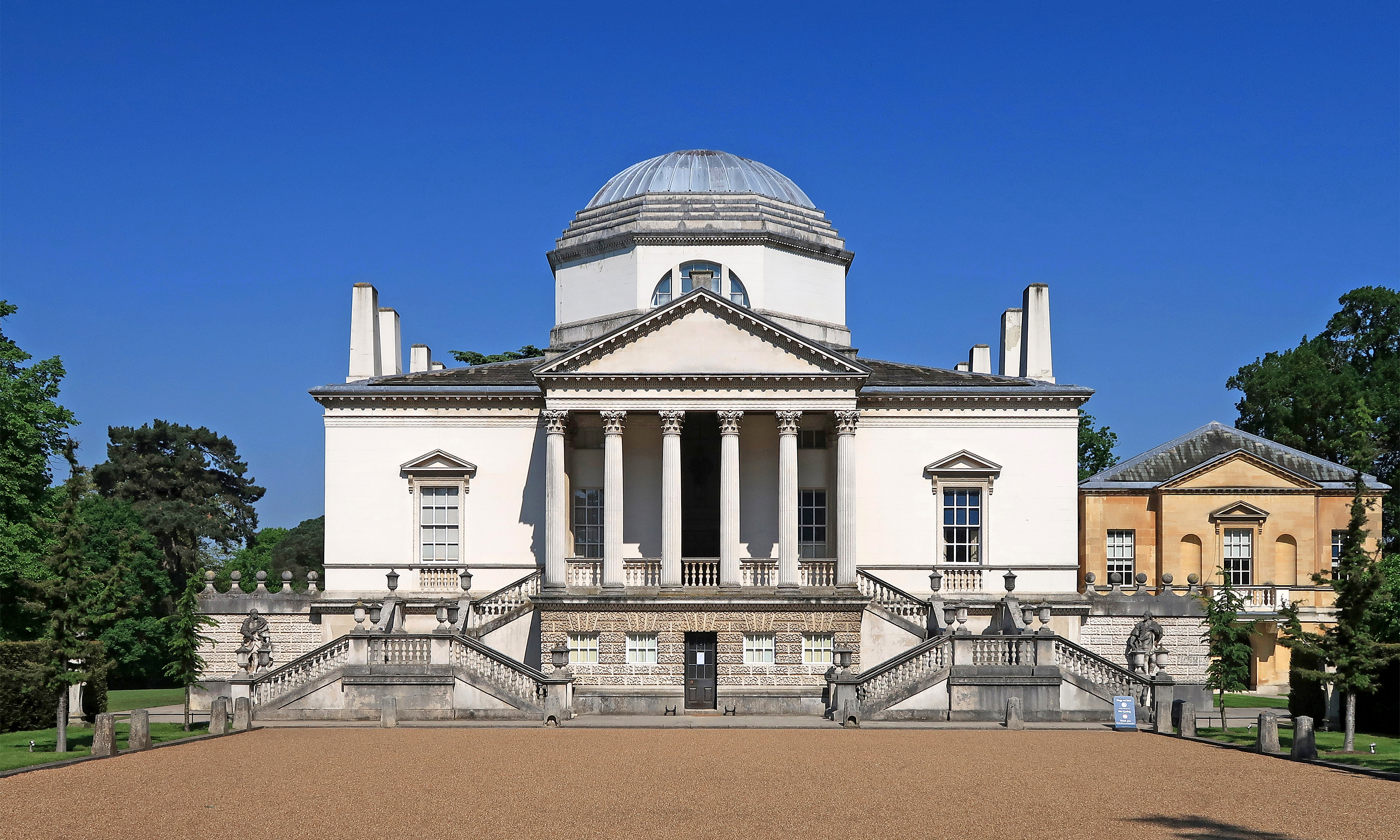
Chiswick House in Palladian style, 1726–29

Chiswick House was designed by the Third Earl of Burlington, and built for him, in 1726–29 as an extension to an earlier Jacobean house (subsequently demolished in 1788); it is considered to be among the finest surviving examples of Palladian architecture in Britain, with superb collections of paintings and furniture. Its surrounding grounds, laid out by William Kent, are among the most important historical gardens in England and Wales, forming one of the first English landscape gardens. It was used as an asylum from 1892 to 1928; up to 40 private patients were housed in wings which were demolished in 1956 when the house was restored.

=== Churches ===
St Nicholas Church, near the river Thames, has a 15th-century tower, although the remainder of the church was rebuilt by J.L. Pearson in 1882–84. Monuments in the churchyard mark the burial sites of the 18th-century English artist William Hogarth and William Kent, the architect and landscape designer; the churchyard also houses a mausoleum (for Philip James de Loutherbourg) designed by John Soane, and the tomb of Josiah Wedgwood's business partner, Thomas Bentley, designed by Thomas Scheemakers. One of Oliver Cromwell's daughters, Mary Fauconberg, lived at Sutton Court and is buried in the churchyard. Enduring legend has it that the body of Oliver Cromwell was also interred with her, though as the Fauconbergs did not move to Sutton Court until 15 years after his disinterment, it is more likely he was reburied at their home at Newburgh Priory. Private Frederick Hitch VC, hero of Rorke's Drift, is also buried there.

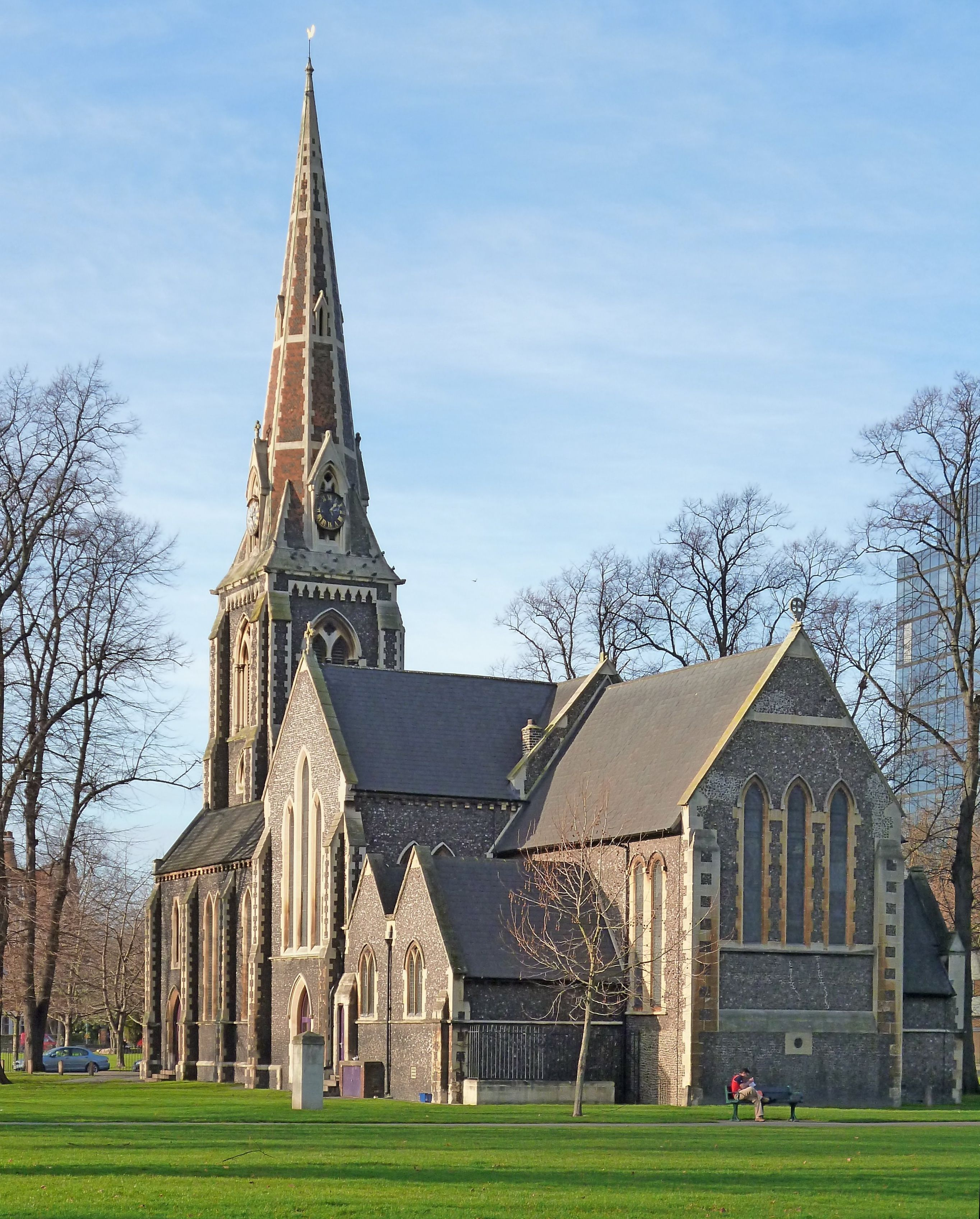
Christ Church, Turnham Green, by George Gilbert Scott, 1843

The church of St Michael, Sutton Court was designed by W. D. Caröe in 1908–1909. It is a red brick building on Elmwood road, in Tudor style. St Paul's Church, Grove Park is a Gothic style stone building designed by H. Currey. It was built largely at the Duke of Devonshire's expense in 1872.

St Michael and All Angels, Bedford Park was initially a temporary iron building from 1876 on Chiswick High Road facing Chiswick Lane. The current building's foundation stone was laid in 1879 and consecrated in 1880. It was designed, along with much of Bedford Park, by Norman Shaw, and was called "a very lovely church" by John Betjeman. It is an Anglo-Catholic church, and was attacked on the day it was consecrated for "Popish and Pagan mummeries" by the brewer Henry Smith, churchwarden of St Nicholas, Chiswick.

Christ Church, Turnham Green is an early Victorian Gothic building of flint with stone dressings. The main part of the building, by George Gilbert Scott and W. B. Moffat, is from 1843; the chancel and northeast chapel were added in 1887 by J. Brooks.

Chiswick's principal Roman Catholic church, Our Lady of Grace and St Edward (the Confessor) in the Diocese of Westminster, lies on the corner of Duke's Avenue and the High Road. It is a red brick building; the parish was founded in 1848, a school began c. 1855, and a church was opened by Cardinal Wiseman on the present site in 1864. It was replaced by the present building in 1886, opened by Cardinal Manning. The heavy debts incurred were paid off and the church consecrated in 1904. The square tower was added after the First World War by Canon Egan as a war memorial.

The Cathedral of the Nativity of the Most Holy Mother of God and the Holy Royal Martyrs with its characteristic blue onion dome with gold stars is in Harvard Road. The Russian Orthodox church built it in 1998.

=== Chiswick Mall ===
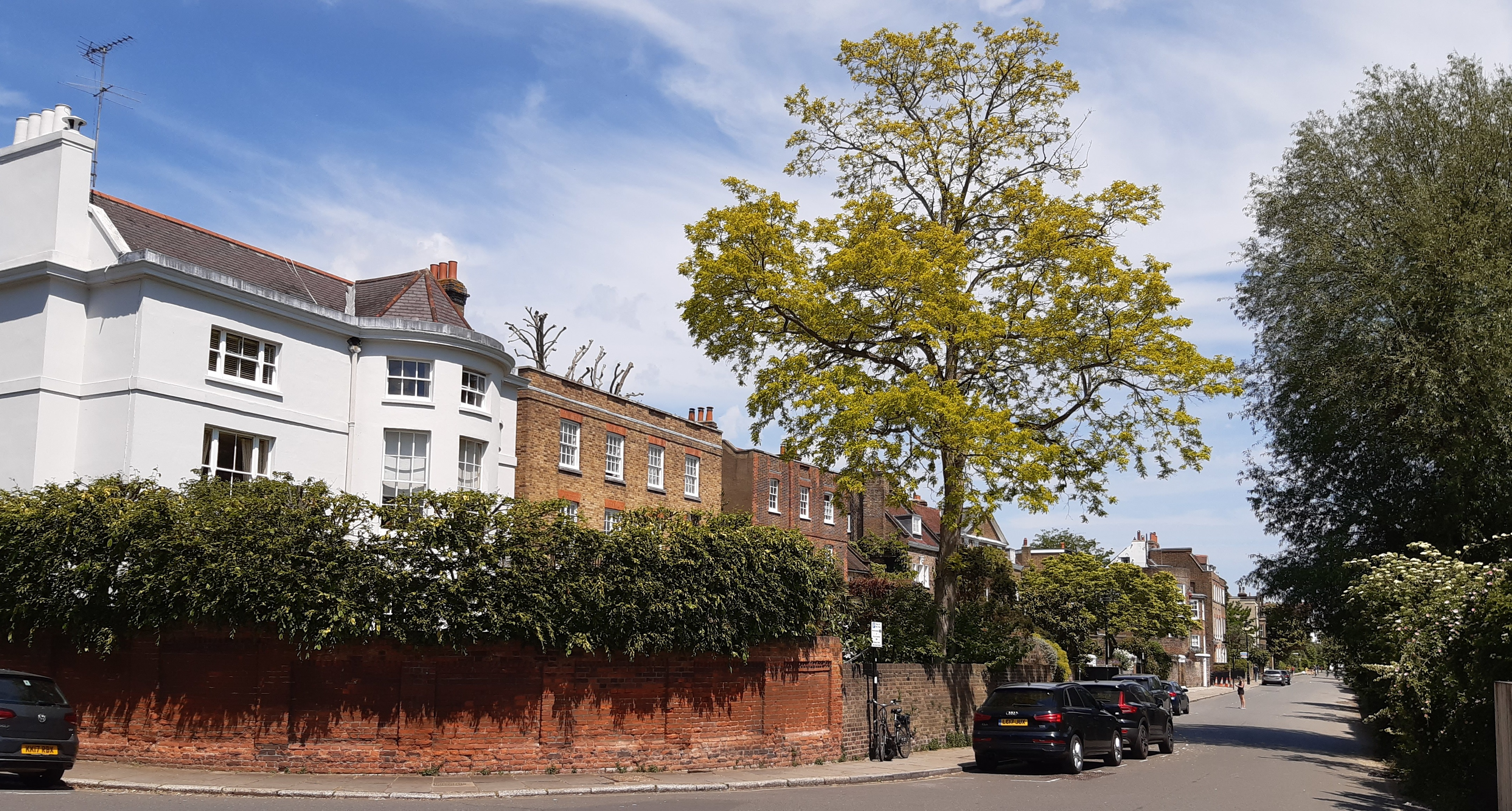
Chiswick Mall, looking east from Church Street. The grand houses are on the left; their waterfront gardens are on the right.

Chiswick Mall is a waterfront street on the north bank of the River Thames in the oldest part of Chiswick near St Nicholas Church. It consists mainly of some thirty "grand houses" from the Georgian and Victorian eras, many of them now listed buildings, overlooking the street on the north side; their gardens are on the other side of the street beside the river. The largest and finest house on the street is Walpole House, a Grade I listed building; part of it is Tudor, but the building now visible is late 17th to early 18th century.

=== Strand-on-the-Green ===
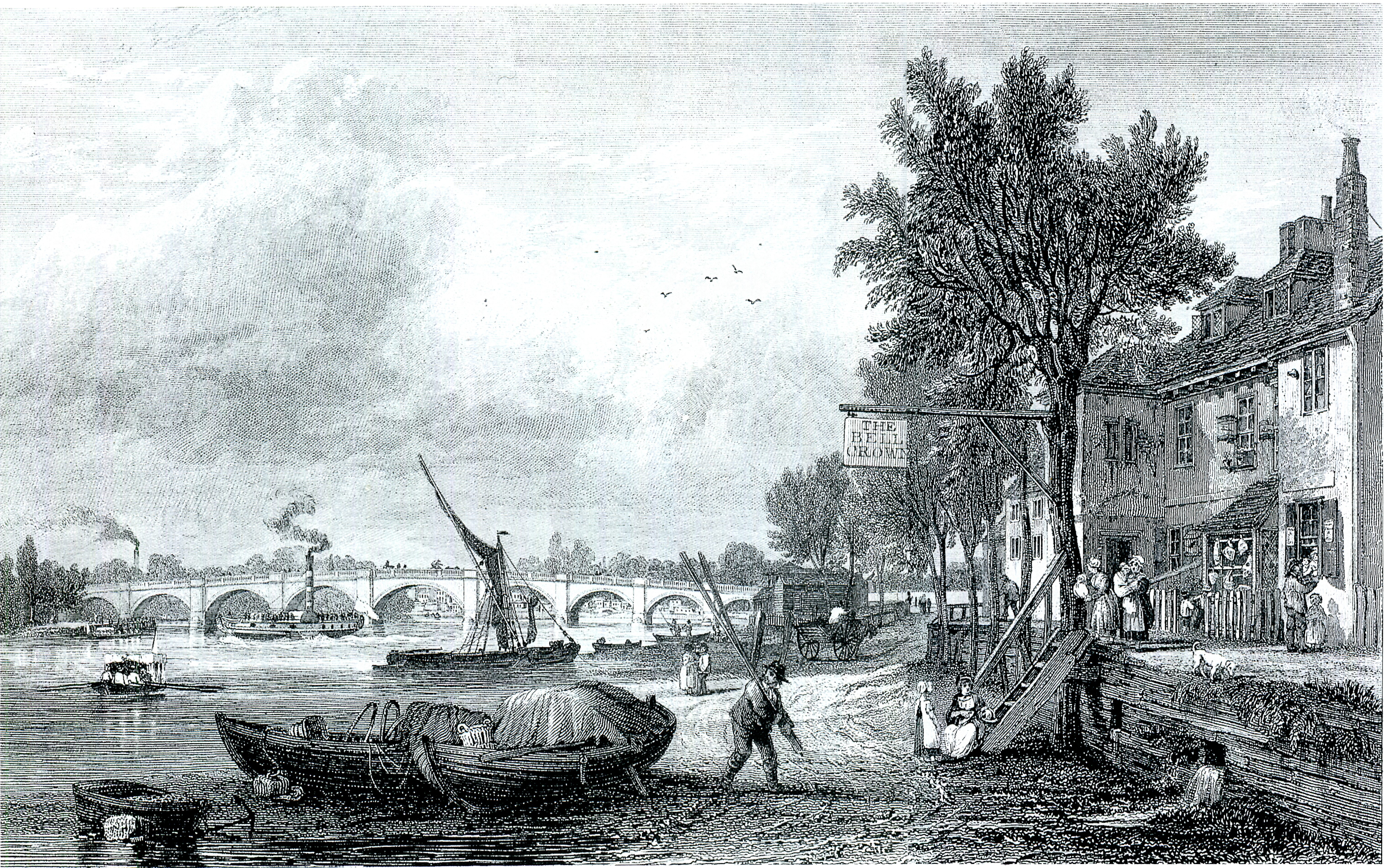
Engraving of Kew Bridge and Strand-on-the-Green, 1832

Strand-on-the-Green is the most westerly part of Chiswick, "particularly picturesque" with a paved riverside path fronted by a row of "imposing" 18th-century houses, interspersed with three riverside pubs, the Bell and Crown, Bull’s Head, and the City Barge. The low-lying path is flooded at high tides. It became fashionable in 1759 when Kew Bridge opened just upstream, with the royal family at Kew Palace nearby.

=== Bedford Park ===
The Bedford Park neighbourhood was described by Nikolaus Pevsner as the first place "where the relaxed, informal mood of a market town or village was adopted for a complete speculatively built suburb". In 1877 the speculator Jonathan Carr hired Shaw as his estate architect. Shaw's house designs, in the Queen Anne Revival style with red brick, roughcast, decorative gables, and both oriel and dormer windows, gave the impression of great variety using only a few types of house. These were scaled-down versions of the more expensive houses that he had designed for wealthy areas such as Chelsea, Hampstead, and Kensington. He also designed the focal buildings of the garden suburb, including the church of St Michael and All Angels and the Tabard Inn opposite it.

=== Duke's Meadows ===
Duke's Meadows stands on land formerly owned by the Duke of Devonshire. In the 1920s, it was purchased by the local council, who developed it as a recreational centre. A promenade and bandstand were built, and the meadows are still used for sport with a rugby club, football pitches, hockey club, several rowing clubs and a golf club. In recent years a local conservation charity, the Dukes Meadows Trust, has undertaken extensive restoration work, which saw a long-term project of a children's water play area opened in August 2006.

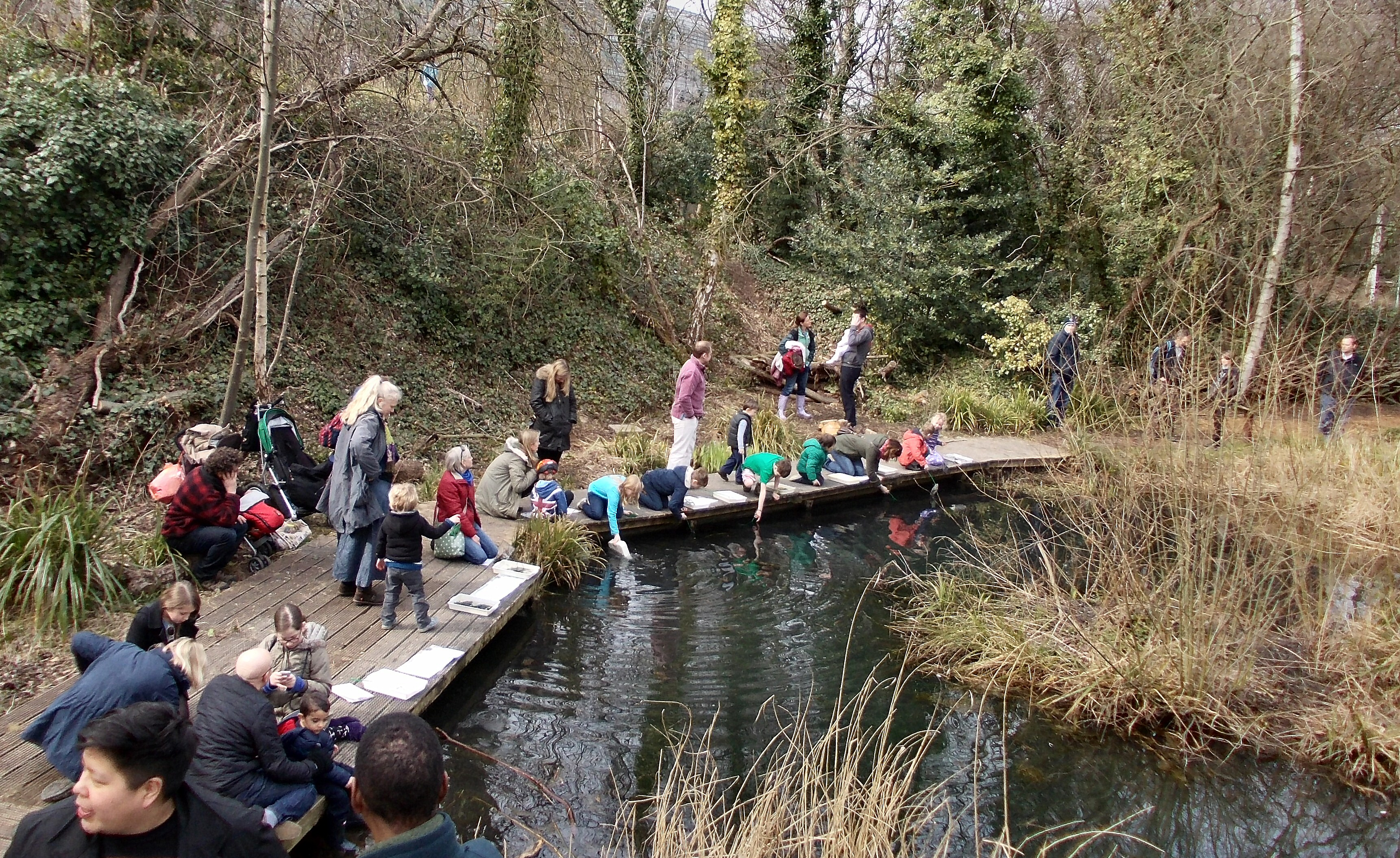
Pond dipping in Gunnersbury Triangle, a local nature reserve

=== Gunnersbury Triangle ===
The Gunnersbury Triangle local nature reserve, opposite Chiswick Park Underground station, is managed by London Wildlife Trust. The area, a railway triangle, was saved from development by a public inquiry, and became a reserve in 1985. Its 2.5 hectares are covered mainly in secondary birch woodland, with willow carr (wet woodland) in the low-lying centre, and acid grassland on the former Acton Curve railway track. The reserve runs a varied programme of activities including wildlife walks, fungus forays, open days and talks.

=== Public houses and theatres ===
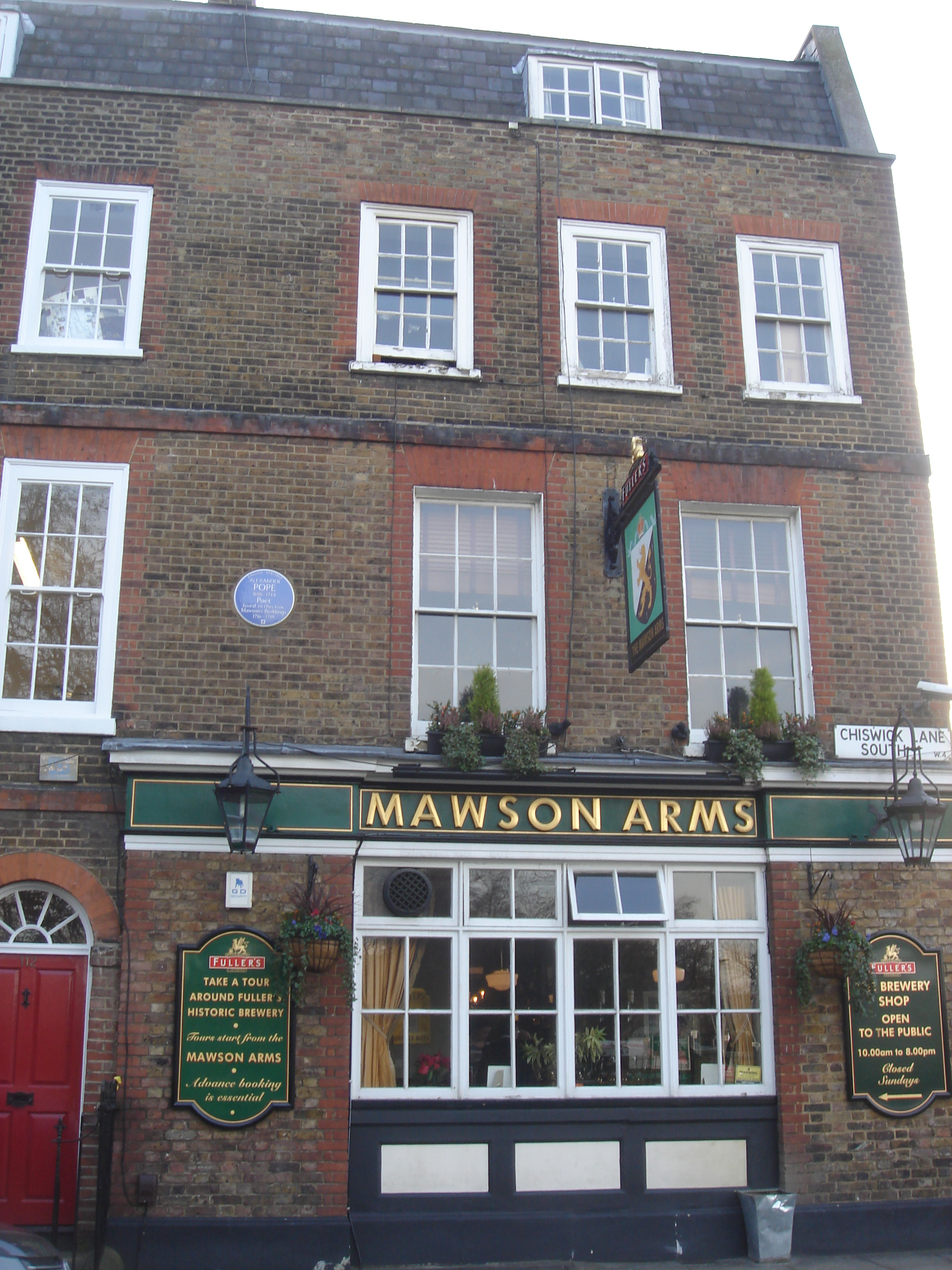
The Mawson Arms, briefly the home of the poet Alexander Pope

There are several historic public houses in Chiswick, some of them listed buildings, including the Mawson Arms, the George and Devonshire, the Old Packhorse and The Tabard in Bath Road near Turnham Green station. The Tabard is known for its William Morris interior and its Norman Shaw exterior; it was built in 1880. Three more pubs are in Strand-on-the-Green, fronting on to the Thames river path.

Chiswick had two well-known theatres in the 20th century. The Chiswick Empire (1912 to 1959) was at 414 Chiswick High Road. It had 2,140 seats, and staged music hall entertainment, plays, reviews, opera, ballet and an annual Christmas pantomime. The Q Theatre (1924 to 1959) was a small theatre opposite Kew Bridge station. It staged the first works of Terence Rattigan and William Douglas-Home, and many of its plays went on to the West End.

The 96-seat Tabard Theatre (1985) in Bath Road, upstairs from the Tabard pub but a separate business, is known for new writing and experimental work.

=== Other buildings ===
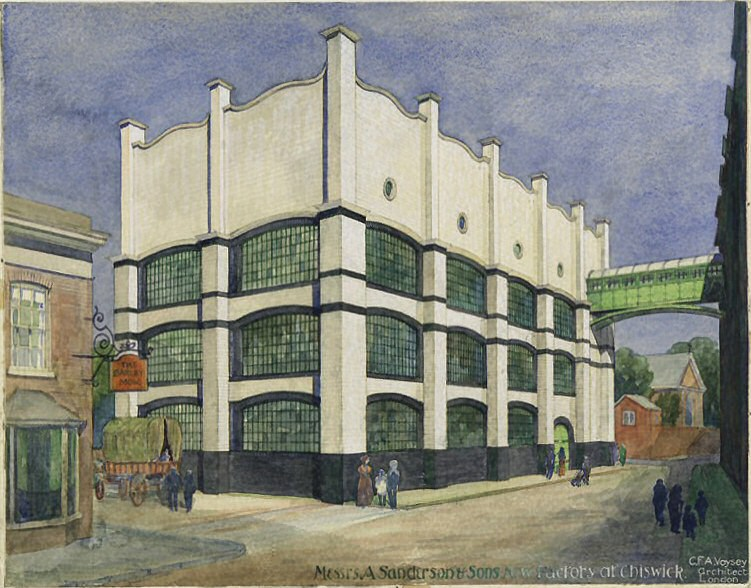
Sanderson wallpaper factory design by Charles Voysey, 1902

The Sanderson Factory in Barley Mow Passage, now known as Voysey House, was designed by the architect Charles Voysey in 1902. It is built in white glazed brick, with Staffordshire blue bricks (now painted black) forming horizontal bands, the plinth, and surrounds for door and window openings, and dressings in Portland stone. It was originally a wallpaper printing works, now used as office space. It is a Grade II* listed building. It faces the main factory building and was once joined to it by a bridge across the road. It was Voysey's only industrial building, and is considered an "important Arts and Crafts factory building".

In 1971, Erin Pizzey established the world's first domestic violence refuge at 2 Belmont Terrace, naming her organisation "Chiswick Women's Aid". The local council attempted to evict Pizzey's residents, but were unsuccessful and she soon established more such premises elsewhere, inspiring the creation of refuges worldwide.

Chiswick is home to the Arts Educational Schools in Bath Road.

The house used for filming the comedy show Taskmaster, a former groundskeeper's cottage, is just off Great Chertsey Road, near Chiswick Bridge.

== Transport ==
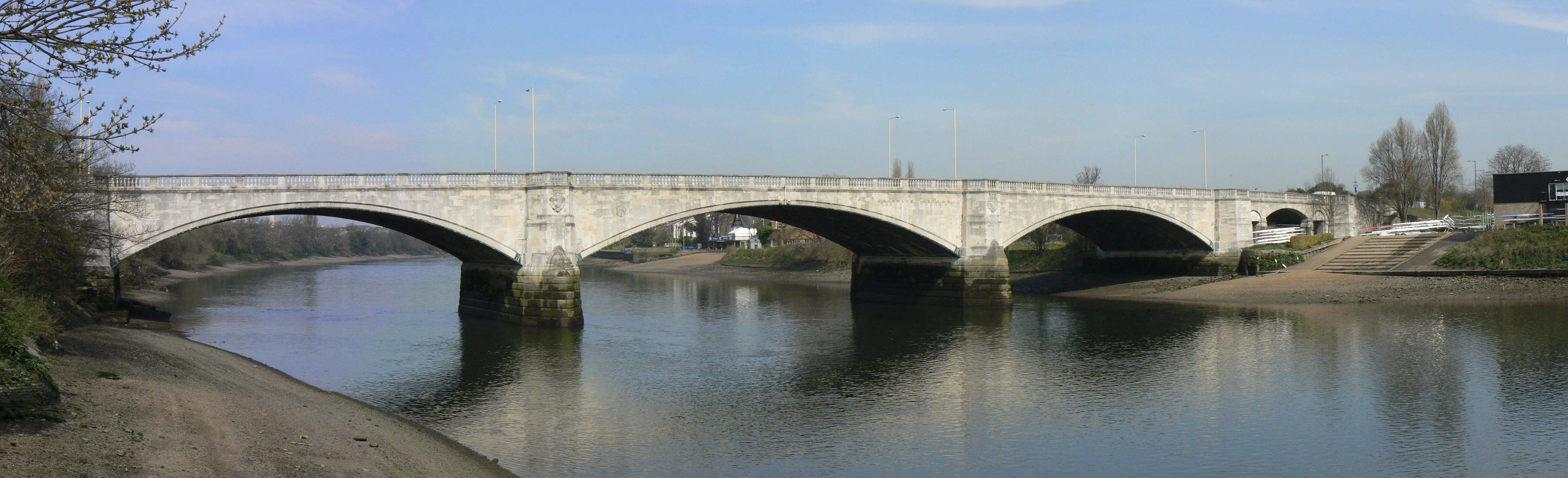
The design of Chiswick Bridge, opened in 1933, has been praised as reflecting the Palladian architecture of Chiswick House.

Chiswick is situated at the start of the North Circular Road (A406), South Circular Road (A205) and the M4 motorway, the latter providing a direct connection to Heathrow Airport and the M25 motorway. The Great West Road (A4) runs eastwards into central London via the Hogarth Roundabout where it meets the Great Chertsey Road (A316) which runs south-west, eventually joining the M3 motorway.

The southern border of Chiswick runs along the River Thames, which is crossed in this area by Barnes Railway and Foot Bridge, Chiswick Bridge, Kew Railway Bridge and Kew Bridge. River services between Westminster Pier and Hampton Court depart from Kew Gardens Pier just across Kew Bridge.

Bus routes on or near Chiswick High Road are the 94, 110, 237, 267, 272, 440, E3 and H91. The 94 is a 24-hour service, and the High Road is also served at night by the N9.

The District line serves Chiswick with four London Underground stations, Stamford Brook, Turnham Green, Chiswick Park and Gunnersbury. Turnham Green is an interchange with the Piccadilly line, but only before 06:50 and after 22:30, when Piccadilly line trains stop at the station. Chiswick railway station on the Hounslow Loop Line is served by a regular South Western Railway service to London Waterloo via Clapham Junction. The North London line crosses Chiswick (north-south); London Overground stations are Gunnersbury and South Acton.

== Sport ==
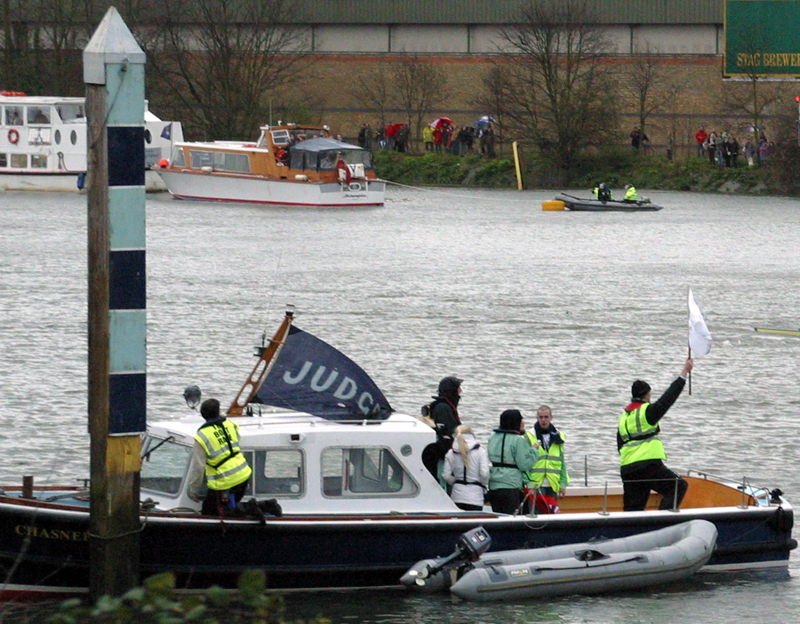
The Boat Race finishing post by Chiswick Bridge

Chiswick's local rugby union teams include Chiswick RFC, formerly Old Meadonians RFC. The team plays league games on a Saturday at Dukes Meadows. Chiswick's cricket club, formerly known as Turnham Green and Polytechnic, plays at Riverside Drive. On Chiswick Common is the Rocks Lane Multi Sports Centre, where there are tennis, five-a-side football and netball courts available to hire to the public. Private tennis coaching for individuals and groups is also available.

The Chiswick reach of the Thames is heavily used for competitive and recreational rowing. The Championship Course from Mortlake to Putney runs past Chiswick Eyot and Duke's Meadows. The Boat Race is contested on the Championship Course on a flood tide (in other words from Putney to Mortlake) with Duke's Meadows a popular view-point for the closing stages of the race. The finishing post is just downstream of Chiswick Bridge. Other important races such as the Head of the River Race race the reverse course, on an ebb tide. Chiswick is home to several clubs. The University of London Boat Club is based in its boathouse off Hartington Road, which also houses the clubs of many London colleges and teaching hospitals; recent members include Tim Foster, Gold medallist at the Sydney Olympics and Frances Houghton, World Champion in 2005, 2006 and 2007. Quintin Boat Club lies between Chiswick Quay Marina and Chiswick Bridge. Tideway Scullers School is just downriver of Chiswick Bridge; its members include single sculling World Champion Mahé Drysdale and Great Britain single sculler Alan Campbell.

Chiswick High Road was once home to the Chequered Flag garage and engineering company which made the Gemini racing car, and its associated motor racing team.

== Notable people ==
=== 17th century ===
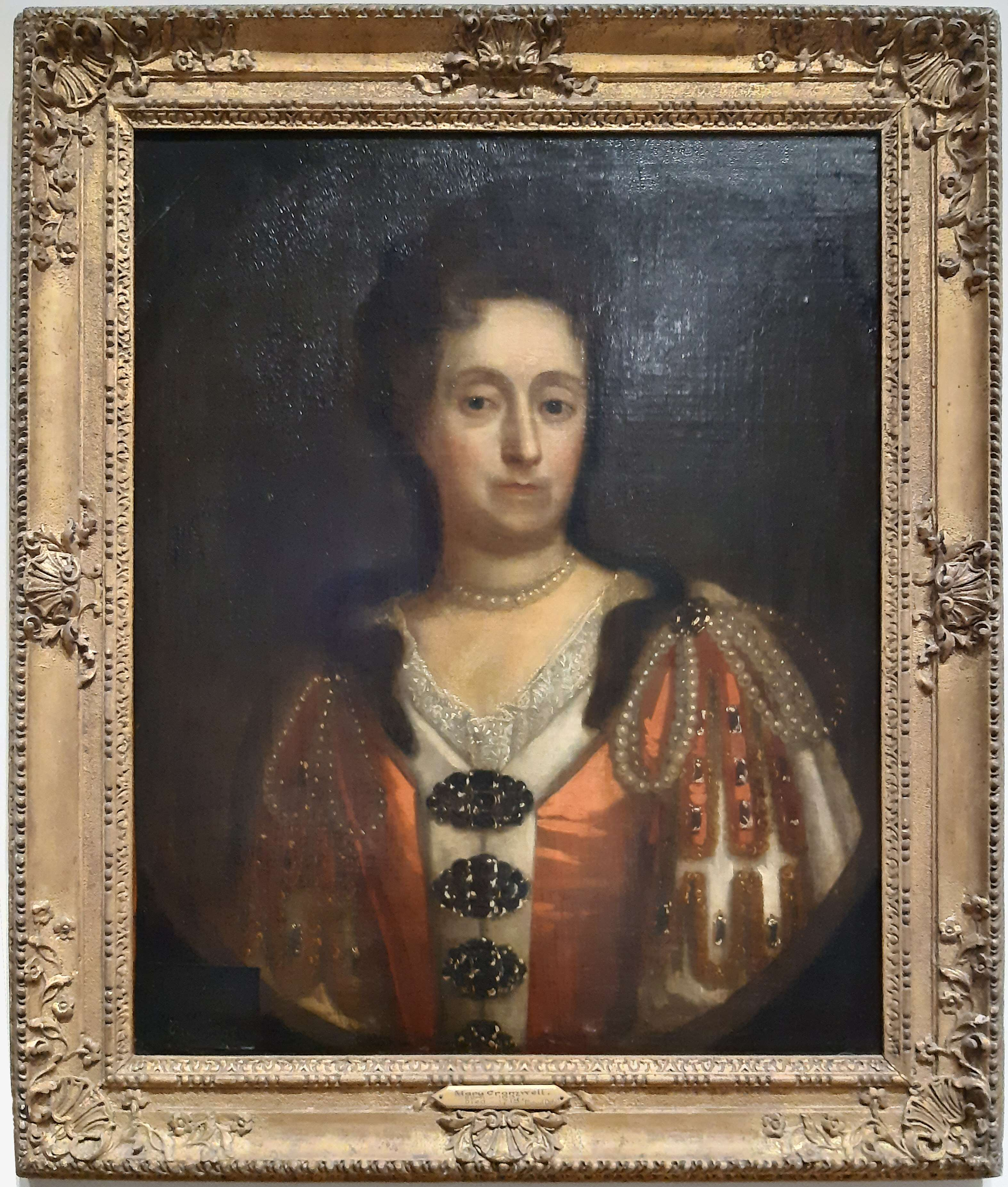
Mary Cromwell, Countess Fauconberg, c. 1700

Mary Cromwell, daughter of Oliver Cromwell, lived in Sutton Manor in Little Sutton from 1676 to her death in 1713. She was married to Thomas Belasyse, 1st Earl Fauconberg, who supported Parliament during the English Civil War.

=== 18th century ===
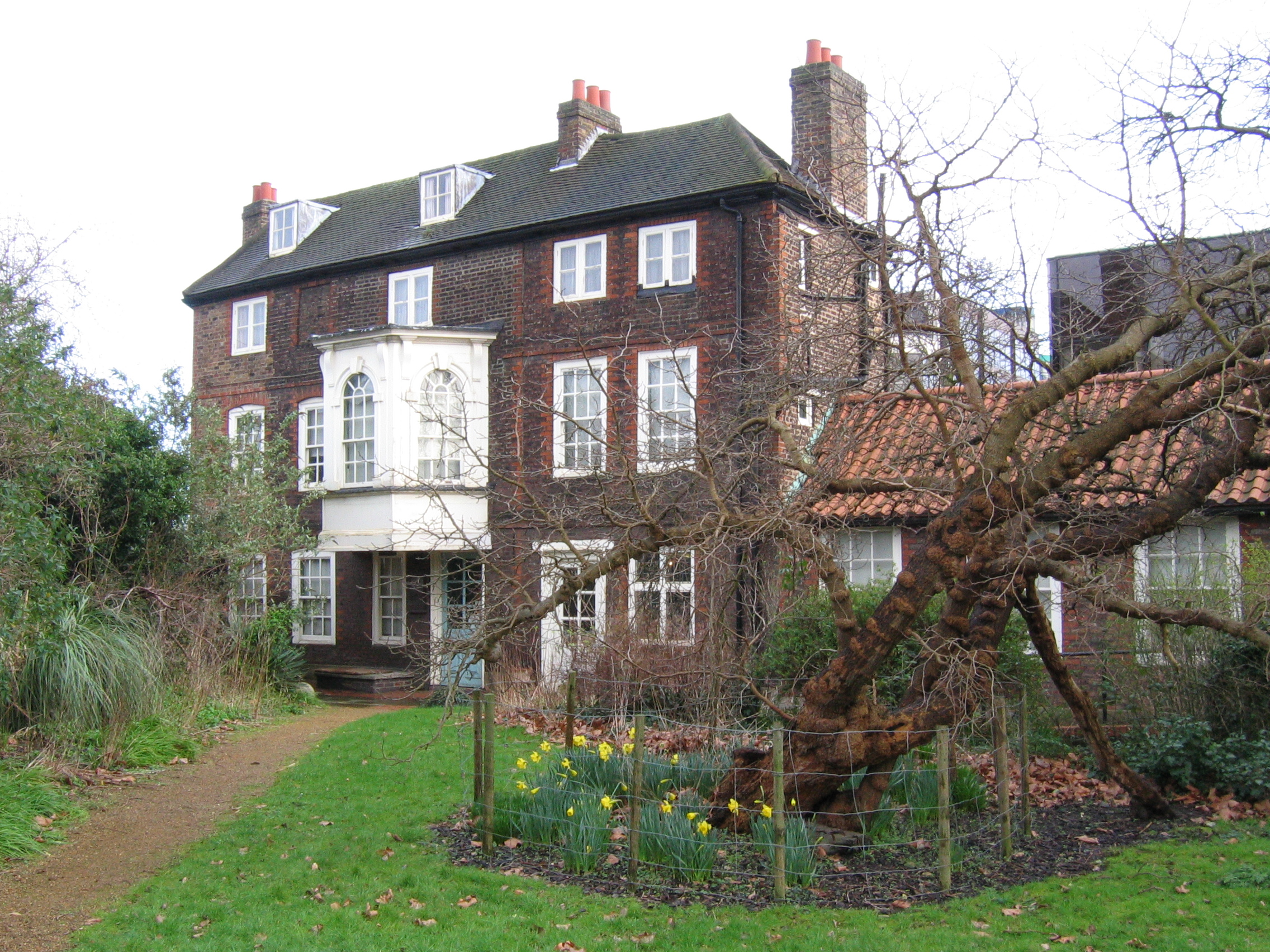
Hogarth's House, later the home of the poet Henry Francis Cary

In the 18th century, the poet Alexander Pope, author of The Rape of the Lock, lived in Chiswick between 1716 and 1719, in the building which is now the Mawson Arms at the corner of Mawson Lane. The actor Charles Holland was born in Chiswick in 1733. The artist William Hogarth bought the house now known as Hogarth's House in 1749, lived there until his death in 1764, and is buried in St Nicholas's churchyard. The house later belonged to the poet and translator of Dante, Henry Francis Cary, who lived there from 1814 to 1833. In February 1766 Jean-Jacques Rousseau lived a few weeks with a local grocer, before moving to Wootton, Staffordshire. The painter Johann Zoffany lived on Strand-on-the-Green.

=== 19th century ===
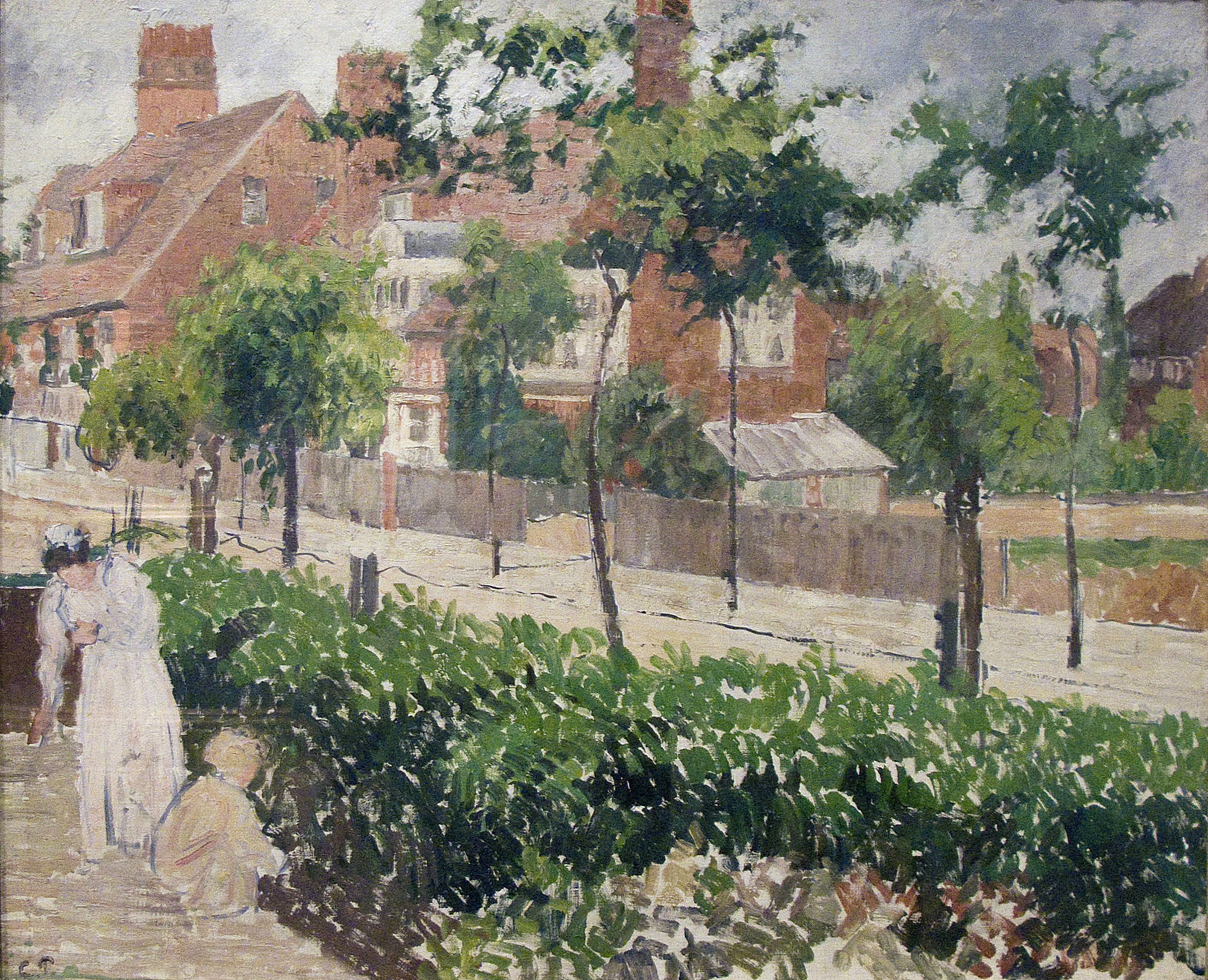
Bath Road, London, 1897. Impressionist painting of Bath Road, Bedford Park by Camille Pissarro

Two prominent early 19th century politicians both died, in the same room, at Chiswick House - Whig Foreign Secretary Charles James Fox in 1806 and Tory Prime Minister George Canning in 1827.

The Italian writer, revolutionary and poet Ugo Foscolo died in exile at Turnham Green in 1827, and was buried at St Nicholas Churchyard, Chiswick, where his monument remains, although in 1871 his body was taken to Italy and given a national hero's burial in Santa Croce, Florence alongside Michelangelo and Galileo, while his monument in Chiswick was lavishly refurbished.

The inventor of the electric telegraph, Francis Ronalds, lived on Chiswick Lane from 1833 to 1852. Another engineer, John Edward Thornycroft was born in Chiswick in 1872; his father, John Isaac Thornycroft, had founded the Chiswick-based John I. Thornycroft & Company shipbuilding company in 1864, which Thornycroft later joined and developed. The artist Montague Dawson, regarded as one of the best 20th-century painters of the sea, was born in Chiswick in 1895.

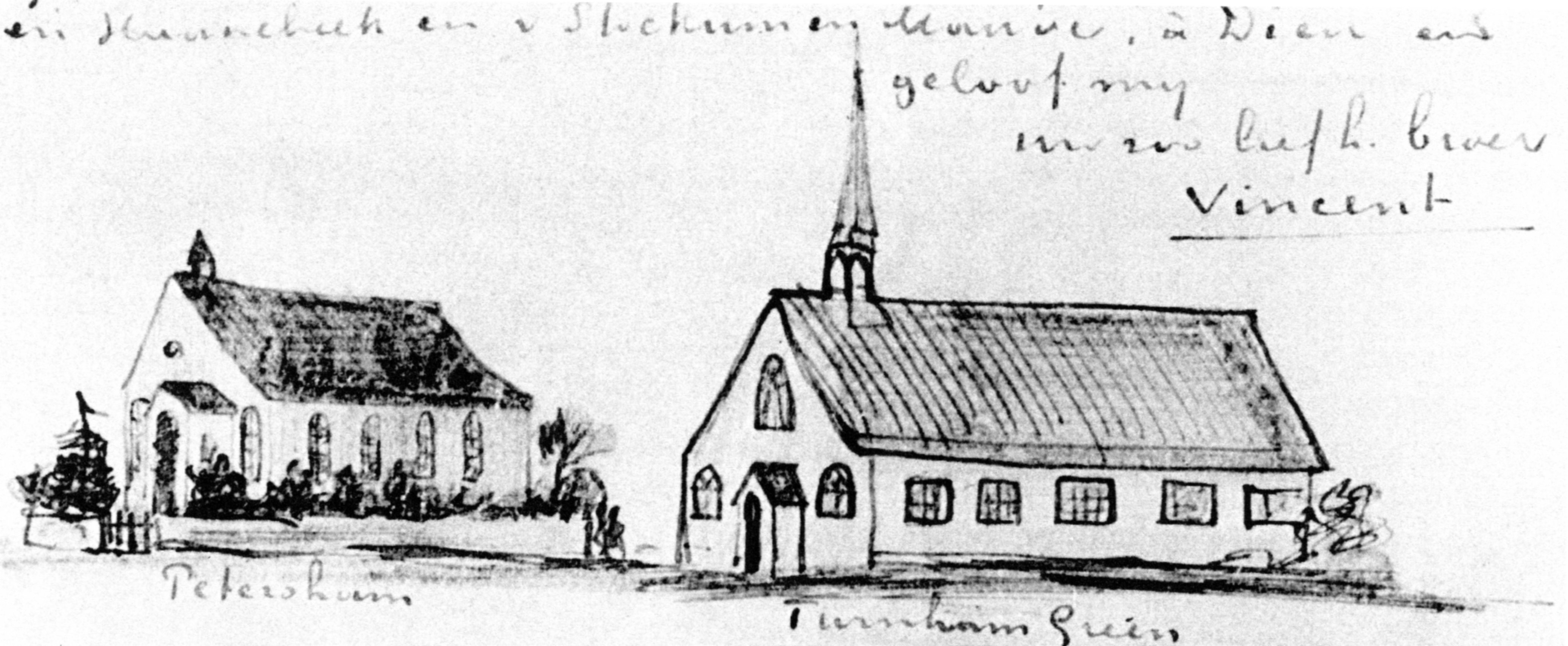
Sketch of Turnham Green Congregational Church (right) by Vincent van Gogh, c. 1875. He taught Sunday school in the iron structure.

The painter Vincent van Gogh spent three years in Chiswick in the 1870s, teaching Sunday school pupils in the newly-constructed Chiswick Congregational Church, which was on the site of the Arlington Park Mansions on Turnham Green; he wrote of Chiswick as a "verdant" district of London.

The poet W. B. Yeats lived in Woodstock Road as a boy from 1879, and came back in 1887 to live in Blenheim Road, where, inspired by Chiswick Eyot, he wrote The Lake Isle of Innisfree.

The Pissarro family of painters, the impressionist Camille Pissarro, his eldest son Lucien, as well as Felix and Ludovic-Rodo lived in 62 Bath Road, Chiswick around 1897; with Camille Pissarro painting a series of notable landscapes of the area. The landscape artist Lewis Pinhorn Wood lived at Homefield Road from 1897 to 1908.

=== 20th century ===
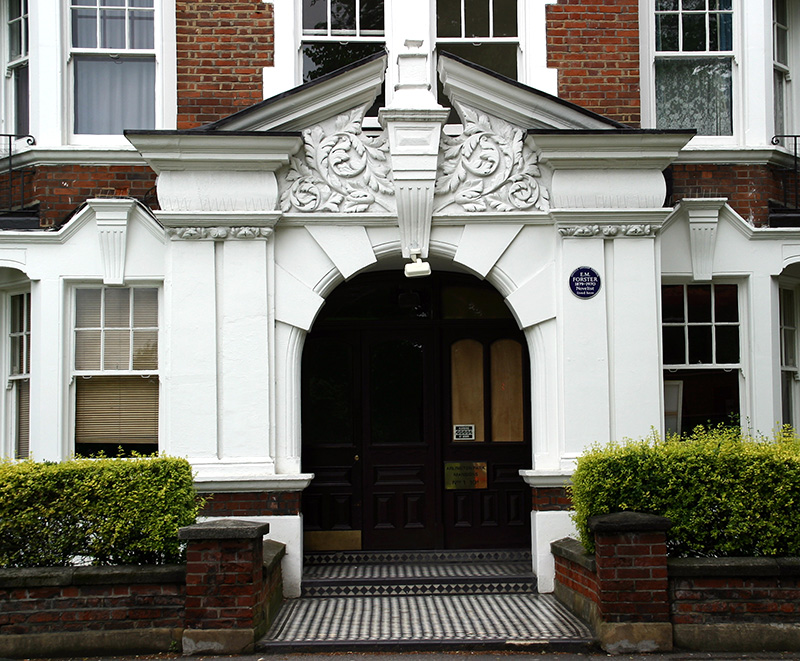
Arlington Park Mansions, facing Turnham Green, with E. M. Forster blue plaque

In the twentieth century, the novelist E. M. Forster (1879–1970) lived at 9 Arlington Park Mansions from 1939 until at least 1961. John Osborne (1929–1994) wrote his play Look Back in Anger on his houseboat at Cubitts Yacht Basin.

Notable people born before the Second World War include the cricketers Patsy Hendren (1899–1962) and Jack Robertson (1917–1996), the editor and publisher Kaye Webb (1914-1996), the novelist Iris Murdoch (1919–1999) who lived on Eastbourne Road, the theatre and film director Peter Brook (1925–2022), the Winchester College headmaster John Leonard Thorn (1925–2023), the zoologist and broadcaster Aubrey Manning (1930–2018), and marine geologist Frederick Vine (1939– ). The comic song performer Michael Flanders (1922–1975) spent the last years of his life in Bedford Park. The actress Sylvia Syms (1934–2023), star of films such as Ice Cold in Alex, lived on Dukes Avenue. The Who rock musicians John Entwistle (1944–2002) and Pete Townshend (1945– ) were both born in Chiswick during the Second World War. Deep Purple lead singer Ian Gillan was born in Chiswick on 19 August 1945.

Those born in Chiswick during the post-war period include the rock musician Dave Cousins, the cricketer Mike Selvey (1948– ), television presenter Sally James (born 1950- ), the musician Phil Collins (1951– ), the singer Kim Wilde (1960– ), illustrator Clifford Harper (1949– ), the photographer Derek Ridgers (1950– ), the actress Kate Beckinsale (1973– ), the comedian Mel Smith (1952–2013), and the cricketer Dimitri Mascarenhas (1977– ).

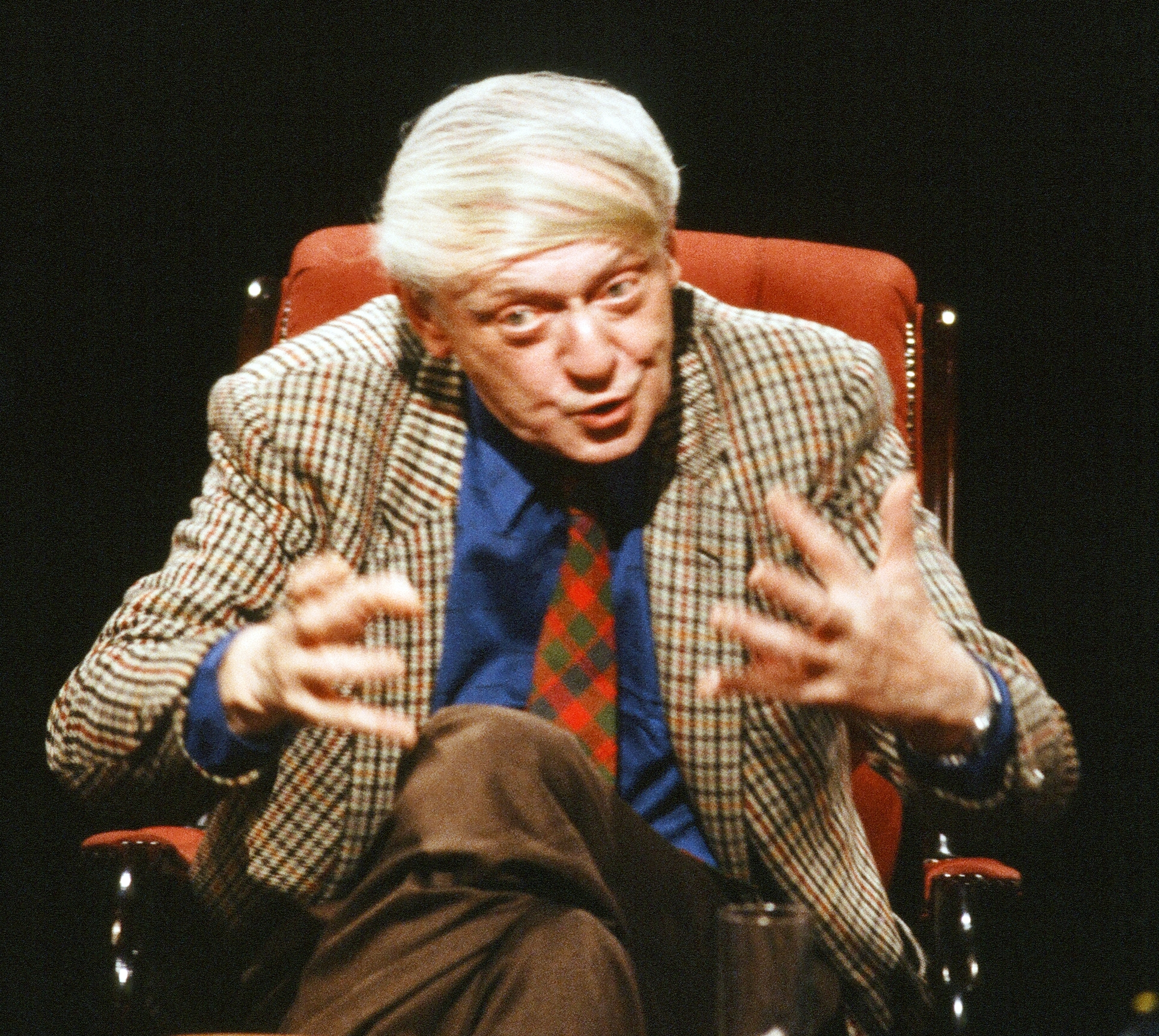
The novelist Anthony Burgess lived in Chiswick in the 1960s.

Among those who have lived in Chiswick are the novelist Anthony Burgess (1917–1993), at 24 Glebe Street in the mid-1960s; the playwright Harold Pinter (1930–2008) who lived at 373 Chiswick High Road; the pianist and broadcaster Sidney Harrison (1903–1986) who in the 1960s lived at 57 Hartington Road and later at 37 The Avenue; the musical double act Bob and Alf Pearson, Bob (1907–1985) on Netheravon Road in the 1940s, and Alf (1910–2012) on Linden Gardens in the 1950s; the pop artist Peter Blake (1932–), in Chiswick since 1967, with a "vast" studio in a former ironmonger's warehouse; the actor Hugh Grant (1960– ), who grew up in Chiswick, living next to Arlington Park Mansions on Sutton Lane; the singer Bruce Dickinson (1958– ) of the band Iron Maiden; the TV presenter Kate Humble (1968– ); the actress Elizabeth McGovern (1961– ) and her husband, film director Simon Curtis (1960– ); the American lawyer John Lowenthal (1925–2003), the actor Imogen Stubbs who lived on a barge and attended Cavendish Primary School, the singer Lonnie Donegan, the musician and songwriter Noel Gallagher (1967–), the model Cara Delevingne (1992– ), and the athlete Georgia Hunter Bell (1993– ) who went to school in Chiswick.

=== 21st century ===
The playwright Michael Frayn (1933– ) and his daughter the film maker and novelist Rebecca Frayn live in Chiswick. Chiswick residents have included the singer Sophie Ellis-Bextor, the TV journalists Alice Arnold, Fergal Keane, Rageh Omaar, and Jeremy Vine, and the actors Phyllis Logan, Colin Firth, David Tennant, Georgia Tennant, and Vanessa Redgrave, the TV presenters Clare Balding, Sarah Greene, Gavin Campbell, Mary Nightingale, and Tim Lovejoy, and the celebrity duo Anthony McPartlin and Declan Donnelly.

== Demography and housing ==
2011 Census Homes
Ward	Detached	Semi-detached	Terraced	Flats and apartments	Caravans etc.	Shared (Note: http://neighbourhood.statistics.gov.uk Key Statistics; Quick Statistics: Population Density Office for National Statistics)
Chiswick Homefields	149	916	1218	2493	12	69
Chiswick Riverside	243	947	1136	2753	3	25
Turnham Green	179	675	1247	2423	2	

2011 Census Households
Ward	Population	Households	% Owned outright	% Owned w. loan	hectares
Chiswick Homefields	11346	4857	25.8	28.1	203
Chiswick Riverside	11543	5107	24.8	31	192
Turnham Green	11448	5443	25.9	23.5	-

== In the arts ==
The 1847/8 novel Vanity Fair by William Makepeace Thackeray opens at Miss Pinkerton's Academy for Young Ladies in Chiswick Mall. Louis N. Parker's 1910 play Pomander Walk has the imagined setting of "a retired crescent of five very small, old-fashioned houses near Chiswick, on the river-bank. ... They are exactly alike: miniature copies of Queen Anne mansions". Ford Madox Ford's 1924/28 Parade's End tetralogy contains many scenes set in Chiswick, where the Wannop family resides. The BBC adaptation of the literary work featured filming on Bedford Park's Woodstock Road.

Basil Dearden's 1961 suspense film Victim, starring Dirk Bogarde as the barrister Melville Farr, was set in Chiswick, and many of its scenes were filmed on Chiswick Mall, where Farr lived. In April 1965 the Beatles film Help used the City Barge pub on the Thames as a backdrop and on 20 May 1966 the band filmed two of their earliest promotional films for the songs "Paperback Writer" and "Rain" in the grounds of Chiswick House. The 1991 official video of the Paul Young and Zucchero duet, Senza una donna was filmed in a church hall in Chiswick. The BBC sitcom My Family was set in Chiswick; it ran from 2000 to 2011.

== See also ==
- List of schools in the London Borough of Hounslow

== Sources ==
- Baker, T. F. T.; et al. (1982). "Chiswick: Growth". A History of the County of Middlesex: Volume 7: Acton, Chiswick, Ealing and Brentford, West Twyford, Willesden. British History Online.
- Clegg, Gillian (1995). Chiswick Past. Historical Publications. ISBN 0-94866-733-8.
- Cherry, Bridget; Pevsner, Nikolaus (1991). The Buildings of England. London 3: North West. London: Penguin Books. ISBN 978-0-14-071048-9. OCLC 24722942.
