= Replica furniture =

The replica furniture industry was developed in the mid-2000s as a means to legally reproduce furniture designs that no longer held valid copyright protection.

Many replica furniture companies are based in the United Kingdom. The current furniture copyright laws in the UK differ from much of the rest of Europe, allowing designer furniture to be reproduced, distributed, and purchased.

Most replica furniture companies produce items originally designed by 20th Century Scandinavian and American designers, some of the most popular being Arne Jacobsen, Charles Eames, and Hans J. Wegner. As of 2015, the industry accounts for thousands of EU jobs and turns over tens of millions of pounds per year.

== Legal basis ==
[Update] After pressure from the European Union, new legislation was expedited. The Independent writes: "From 28 April, furniture designs in Britain will be protected from unlicensed manufacture for 75 years – that's an extra 50. Under the new legislation, retailers selling unlicensed copies – whether classics or bog-standard bog seats – will be liable to fines or jail up to ten years."

UK law originally gave a transitional period lasting from 2015 until 2020. Before 2020 copyright on a design was going to continue to offer protection for 25 years from creation. After this date, the copyright will be held by the designer for 70 years following their death. This change brings UK legislation in line with that of other European countries. As a result, companies who are registered in the UK were free to produce and sell replica furniture until that point.

== Products ==
The items produced by replica furniture companies are typically produced to the same, or very similar, designs as the original products. Sometimes there will be differences in materials and dimensions. They are typically sold at a much lower price point than products from original manufacturers and dealers such as Skandium and Vitra. This is usually because many replica companies are solely online businesses, hence do not pay showroom costs and many also manufacture their furniture abroad. Some of the most popular designs include Verner Panton's Panton Chair, Eames' DSW, DSR, DAR Chairs, and Arne Jacobsen’s AJ Lamp series.

== Legal and customer care issues ==
In May 2014, Infurn.com, one of Europe’s largest replica furniture companies, filed for insolvency due to ever-mounting debts. This gained media attention as customers lost thousands of pounds on unfulfilled orders, while many of the company’s staff’s wages went unpaid. This led to the foundation of the website stopinfurn.com by disgruntled customers and as of February 2015, many of them are still to be reimbursed.

== The Replica Furniture Association ==
In 2014 one company initiated the set-up of the Replica Furniture Association in response to the negative press coverage surrounding the closures of Ikon M and Infurn. The goal of the association was to establish a collective of reproduction furniture companies, each of whom must abide by a strict code of ethics to be considered for membership. These values include providing a high standard of customer service, provable financial stability, and a high customer satisfaction score (However, the site and/or initiative does not exist any longer).
