= Robin Benson =

English merchant banker

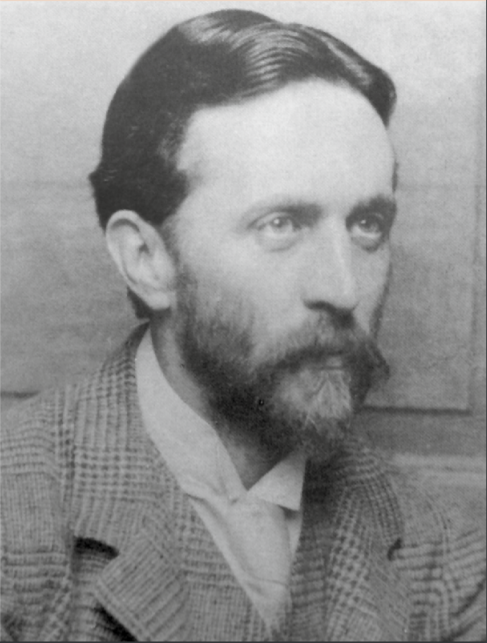
Robin Benson in 1887

Robert Henry "Robin" Benson (24 September 1850 – 7 April 1929) was an English merchant banker and art collector. As an amateur footballer, he was a member of the Oxford University football team which won the FA Cup in 1874.

== Family and education ==
Benson was born on 24 September 1850 at Fairfield House, Fairfield, near Manchester, the eldest of three children of Robert Benson (1814–1875), a merchant, and his wife, Eleanor Sara née Moorsom (1824–1883), the daughter of Vice-Admiral Constantine Moorsom, RN. He was baptised at St Stephen's Church, Audenshaw, on 1 November 1850.

Benson was educated at Eton College, from where he matriculated on 21 October 1869, before going up to Balliol College, Oxford. He graduated as Bachelor of Arts in 1874, having been admitted to the Inner Temple to read for the Bar in January 1873.

== Athletics and football career ==
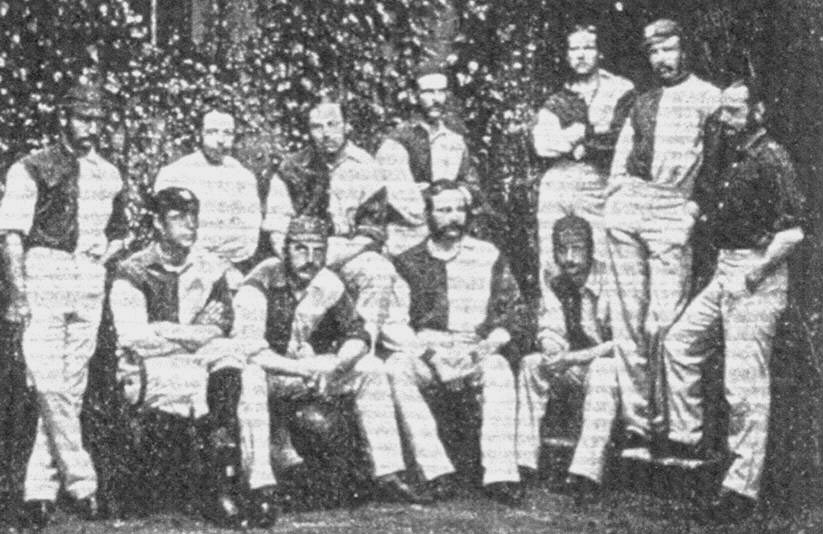
Oxford University's F.A. Cup winning side of 1874. Benson is fifth from left in the back row.

Ar Eton, he was described as "an athlete of more than ordinary distinction".

Benson earned his athletics Blue in 1870, 1872 and 1873 and in 1872, he was appointed President of the Oxford University Athletic Club. In the University Sports of 1870, Benson won the mile race by two yards in a time of 4 minutes 33 seconds. Benson also won the Amateur Athletic Club mile championship in 1870. In 1872, Benson competed in the 3 mile race in the University sports, in which he finished in a dead heat in 15 minutes 44 seconds with Cambridge's Edward Montague Hawtrey, whose brother John played for Old Etonians in the 1879 FA Cup Final. In 1873, Benson again ran in the mile race, finishing fourth.

Benson played football at Eton and for Oxford University. He played as outside-right and was described as "a brilliant forward at times, but a little wanting in strength; has great pace, and is a clever dribbler", and as "a good forward and very useful as a wing player; fast and dribbles well". Benson was selected as a member of the University team that played in the 1874 FA Cup Final. In the final, played at Kennington Oval on 14 March 1874 against a team from the Royal Engineers, the university ran out as 2–0 winners, with goals from Charles Mackarness and Frederick Patton. Shortly after the FA Cup final, Benson played for Oxford in the first Varsity match against Cambridge University, won 1–0 by Oxford.

In 1875, Benson was selected to represent Old Etonians in the FA Cup Final, played at Kennington Oval on 13 March.The match ended in a 1–1 draw, with Benson missing a fine chance to score early in the match, from a centre by Cuthbert Ottaway, the team captain. Benson was one of four players who were unavailable for the replay three days later, and was replaced by Thomas Hamond. The weakened Old Boys team lost the replay to a full strength Royal Engineers 2–0.

After leaving university, Benson also made a few appearances for the Wanderers.

== Banking career ==
In October 1874, Benson was sent to Boston to join the family mercantile business but returned to England after the sudden death of his father in January 1875. On 19 January 1875, Benson and his brother, Constantine, became partners in the Moorgate-based mercantile firm of Robert Benson & Co. This partnership was only short lived, and was declared bankrupt in June 1875 following the failure of many creditors after the financial crash of 1873, which had been masked by accounting irregularities.

Later that year, family connections enabled Benson to join the banking business of John Walter Cross (who married the novelist George Eliot in 1880), becoming a junior partner in the firm, under the name Cross, Benson & Co. The firm was primarily engaged in the business of investment in American securities for private clients, and Benson rapidly built up a profitable business financing railroads in the American mid-west. Benson amassed a substantial personal fortune by identifying Chicago and the mid-west as growth areas, following the 1873 crash, selling out profitably as the economy recovered. At the end of 1882, Cross retired from the partnership following which the firm became Robert Benson & Co.

Benson was a forerunner in the investment trust industry in conjunction with his friends Robert Fleming and Alexander Henderson, going on to found the Merchants Trust in 1889. Benson also became heavily engaged in the financing of railways and mining development in Southern Africa, especially in Southern Rhodesia, where his brother-in-law Albert Grey, later the 4th Earl Grey, was administrator.

Benson was also a director of several other companies, including the Anglo-American Telegraph Company, of which he was chairman, the London Electric Supply Corporation and the St. James's and Pall Mall Electric Light Company.

== Art collector ==
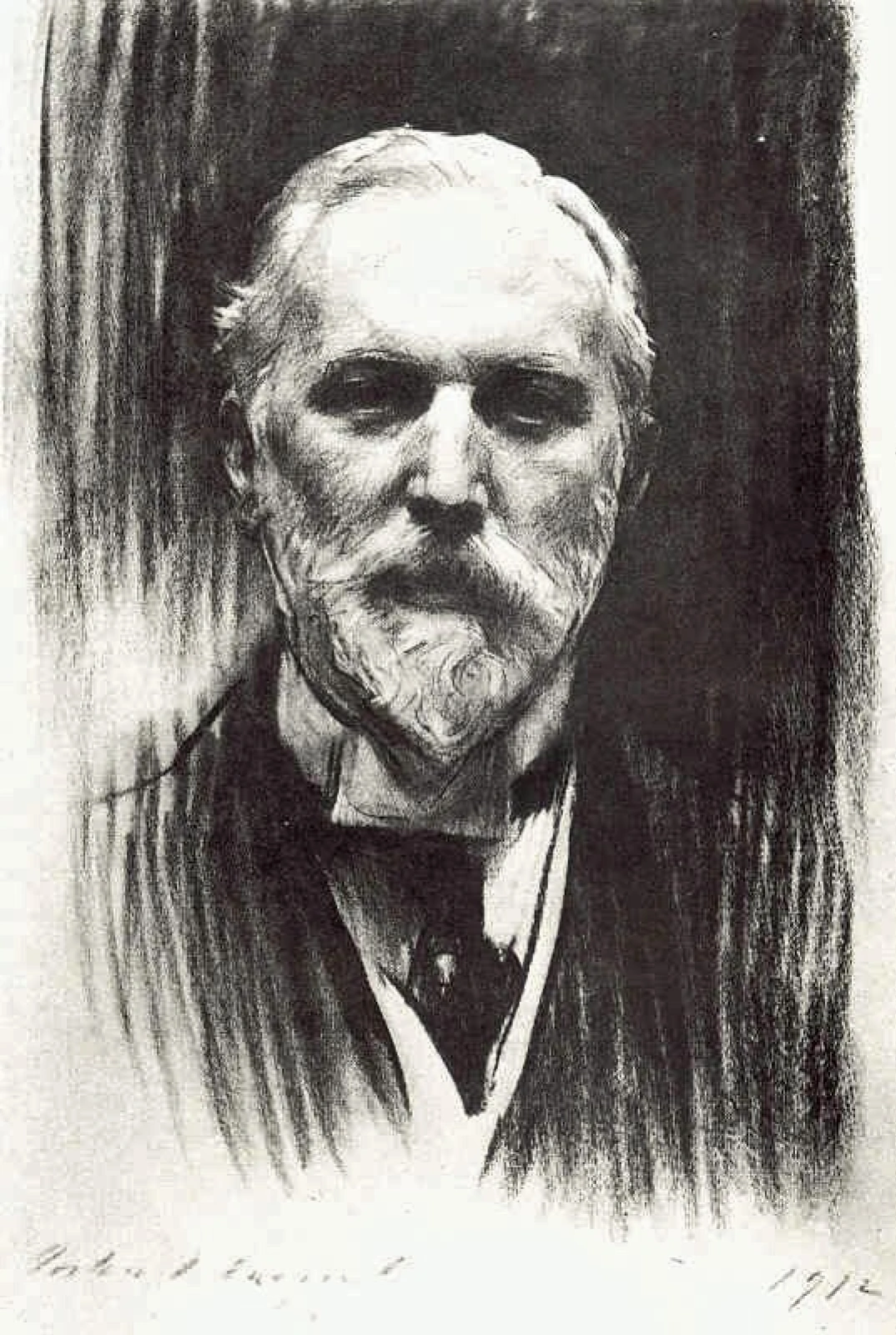
Robin Benson in 1912 (John Singer Sargent)

By the early 1880s, Benson had started to build up his collection of Italian pictures, with the purchase of several paintings in 1884 from the art dealer Martin Colnaghi, including Portrait of a Collector by Mario Basaiti, Madonna and Child, attributed to Bastiano Mainardi, and A Triumphal Procession with Prisoners by Andrea Schiavone.

Following his marriage in 1887 to Evelyn Holford, the daughter of the art collector Robert Holford, Benson began to spend more of his time on his collection of paintings from the fourteenth and fifteenth centuries, adding works by Duccio di Buoninsegna, and many old masters including Giorgione, Botticelli, Correggio and Titian. In total, he amassed a collection of 114 early Italian paintings, as well as pictures by Thomas Gainsborough and Edward Burne-Jones.

Benson and his wife also created a noted collection of early Chinese porcelain and pottery, which was loaned to the City of Manchester Art Gallery "Exhibition of Chinese Applied Art" in 1913, and later to the Victoria & Albert Museum.

In 1914, Benson published a catalogue of his art collection, and later two catalogues of the Holford family collections, "The Holford Collection at Westonbirt" (1924) and "The Holford Collection, Dorchester House" (1927). He sold his entire collection of paintings to Joseph Duveen, 1st Baron Duveen in 1927.

== Writer on economic policy ==
During the First World War, the banking operations were virtually suspended, enabling Benson to write about economic policy and act as an unofficial city advisor. In May 1916, he prepared a "Resumė of War Finance" for the government. In 1918, he published a booklet in which he advocated the creation of a central bank to manage the market in Government securities.

== After the First World War ==
When normal merchant banking activities resumed after the war, Benson realised that the bank was in need of increased capitalisation. As a result, in 1924 he brought his three sons into the business, and sold his collection of Chinese porcelain by auction at Christie's in order to raise funds.

Two years later, the partnership was converted into a limited liability company. Following the death of his brother-in-law, George Holford in September 1926, the large Holford family holding in the bank had to be realised by the estate, requiring Benson to sell his entire art collection. The collection was sold in its entirety to the art dealer Joseph Duveen for $2.5 million in 1927.

== Public offices ==
Benson was very active in public life, being a trustee of the National Gallery from 1912, and on the board of the Tate Gallery. He was the treasurer of the National Art Collections Fund from 1906, and a long-time member of the Burlington Fine Arts Club, regularly loaning pictures and porcelain for its exhibitions. He was also a member of the council of the Victoria and Albert Museum, a member of the Royal College of Music, and a Justice of the Peace.

== Marriage and children ==
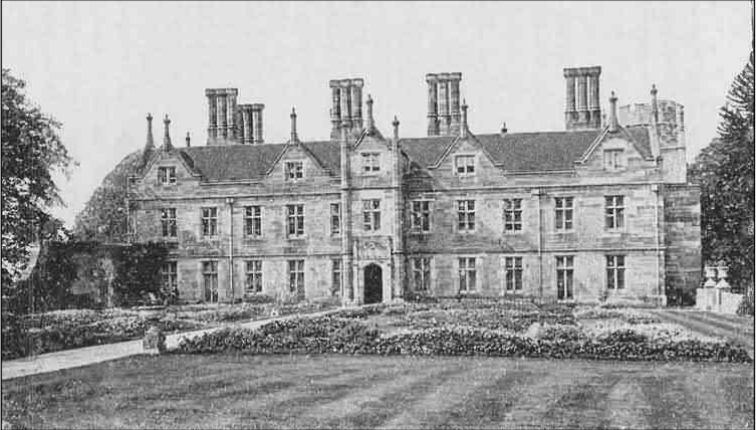
Buckhurst c.1900

On 7 July 1887, at St George's church, Hanover Square, Westminster, Benson married Evelyn Holford (1856–1943), the daughter of Robert Stayner Holford of Weston Birt in Gloucestershire. The couple had five children:

- Guy Holford Benson (1888–1975)
- Reginald Lindsay (Rex) Benson (1889–1968)
- Margaret Winifred (Daisy) Benson (1892–1976)
- Constantine Evelyn Benson (1895–1960)
- Rosalind Frances (Lindy) Benson (1899–1982)

From 1902 to 1927, Benson and his family lived at Buckhurst Park, Withyham in (East) Sussex which he rented on a 25-year lease from Gilbert Sackville, Earl De La Warr. During his time at Buckhurst, Benson made considerable changes to the house, engaging architect Edwin Lutyens to add an extensive wing.

In 1926, Benson and his wife purchased Walpole House, the largest house in Chiswick Mall, Chiswick, which at one time had been the home of Thomas Walpole.

== Death ==
Benson died of a paralytic stroke on 8 April 1929 at Walpole House. He was buried in St Catherine's churchyard at Westonbirt, Gloucestershire (now part of Westonbirt School). A memorial service was held at St Martin-in-the-Fields on 10 April 1929. He left an estate valued for probate at £116,500.

== Sporting honours ==
Oxford University

- FA Cup winner: 1874

Old Etonians

- FA Cup runners-up: 1875

== Bibliography ==
- Cavallini, Rob (2005). The Wanderers - Five Time F.A. Cup Winners. Worcester Park: Dock N Duck Publications. ISBN 978-0-9550496-0-6.
- Collett, Mike (2003). The Complete Record of the FA Cup. Sports Books. ISBN 1-899807-19-5.
- Gibbons, Philip (2001). Association Football in Victorian England – A History of the Game from 1863 to 1900. Upfront Publishing. ISBN 1-84426-035-6.
- Warsop, Keith (30 November 2004). The Early F.A. Cup Finals and the Southern Amateurs. Nottingham: SoccerData. ISBN 978-1899468782.
