= Rex Benson (merchant banker) =

English bankers

Lieutenant-Colonel Sir Reginald Lindsay "Rex" Benson, DSO, MVO, MC (20 August 1889 – 26 September 1968) was an English merchant banker and army officer.

== Early life and family ==
He was born in Mayfair, the son of the merchant banker and art collector Robert Henry Benson and his wife Evelyn Mary, daughter of the art collector and politician Robert Stayner Holford. After attending Ludgrove School and Eton (where he was captain of cricket and president of Pop), he went up to Balliol College, Oxford, but left after a year in 1909 to become a soldier with the Life Guards.

He was the older brother of Constantine Evelyn Benson CBE DSO.

== Military career ==
Benson became a subaltern with the 9th Queen's Royal Lancers the following year and was appointed aide-de-camp to the Viceroy of India in 1913. He returned to his regiment when the First World War broke out and served in France in the battles of Aisne, Ypres and Messines; for his conduct in the latter, he was awarded the Military Cross. In 1915, he was gassed and wounded during the Second Battle of Ypres and repatriated to England for treatment. When he had sufficiently recovered, he was appointed as liaison officer to the French Minister of Marine, but he was unofficially a representative of the head of the British secret service. After serving in Ireland during the Easter Rising (1916), he returned to France as liaison officer firstly with General Franchet D'Esperay and then with Marshal Petain; the French government awarded him the Croix de Guerre and appointed him a member of the Légion d'honneur. With the war over, he became Chief of the British Mission at the Paris Peace Conference of 1919. After promotion to Major in 1920, Benson became Military Secretary to the Governor of Bombay, and assisted with organising the Prince of Wales's 1922 tour. He resigned from the Army thereafter, but was placed on a secret mission by the Prime Minister David Lloyd George to trade with the Soviet Union. He sold tea and other supplies to the value of £10,000, which he smuggled out in his boots.

== Banking and diplomacy ==
In 1924 the family's banking company, Robert Benson & Co, was reorganised so that Benson became a partner; the firm were largely exposed to US securities, which proved disastrous after the Wall Street crash, their offices sitting empty for some time. However, by 1934 the firm had recovered most of its lost capital; Benson managed the English and New York trust well enough to see its value nearly double between 1928 and 1935, despite plummeting immediately after the crash. He made business trips to North America, taking out a range of US investments, and in 1936 succeeded his elder brother as chairman of the company. His career was interrupted by the Second World War, when he served as liaison officer to the French First Army until the evacuation from Dunkirk, and then as chairman of the Inter-Allied Timber Commission in 1940, and then from 1941 as Military Attaché at the British Embassy in Washington. After the war, he resumed his chairmanship of Benson's, overseeing the merger with the Lonsdale Investment Trust to form Robert Benson Lonsdale & Co. He was knighted in 1958 for his service as Honorary Treasurer to the English-Speaking Union. The following March, he retired from the RBL's chairmanship, but continued to sit on the board until 1961.

== Personal ==
In 1932, Benson married Leslie, Condé Nast's former wife, and daughter of an Illinois investment banker, Albert Volney Foster. They had two sons and Benson was step-father to a daughter from Leslie's previous marriage.

He died suddenly in Naples in 1968.
