= Merchants Trust =

British investment trust

Merchants Investment Trust
- Company type: Public company
- Traded as: LSE: MRCH; FTSE 250 component
- Industry: Investment Management
- Founded: 1889; 136 years ago
- Headquarters: London, United Kingdom
- Key people: Colin Clark (Chairman)
- Website: Official site

Merchants Trust (LSE: MRCH) is a large British investment trust dedicated to investments in higher yielding FTSE 100 Index companies. It is listed on the London Stock Exchange and is a constituent of the FTSE 250 Index.

== History ==
The company was established by the banker and art collector, Robin Benson, in February 1889. At that time, under Benson's guidance, it invested in North American railways but, in the mid-20th century, it refocussed on large UK listed companies. Nigel Lanning of RCM (UK) Limited became manager in 1984. RCM (UK) Limited was acquired by Allianz Global Investors in 2002 and Simon Gergel became manager in 2006. The chairman is Colin Clark.
