= Walpole House =

House in Chiswick, London, England

Coordinates: 51°29′15″N 00°14′51″W

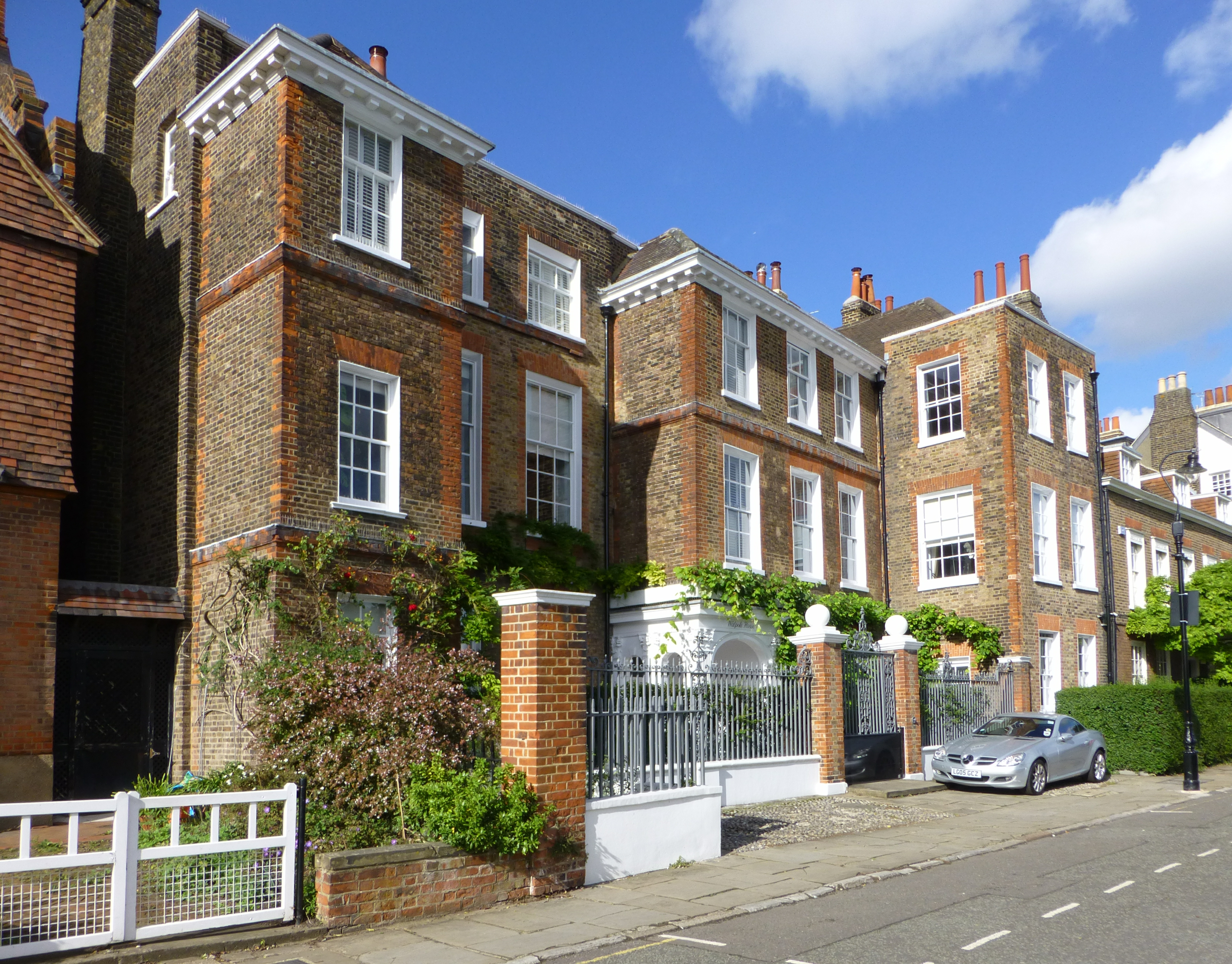
Walpole House, a Grade I listed building on Chiswick Mall

The Grade I listed building Walpole House is the largest, finest, and most complicated of the grand houses on Chiswick Mall, a waterfront street in the oldest part of Chiswick. Both the front wrought-iron screen and gate, and the back boundary wall, are Grade II listed.

The house was started in the Tudor era, with internal features surviving from the 16th and 17th centuries; the river frontage was built around 1730. The 0.5 hectares (1.2 acres) garden is listed in the English Heritage Register of Parks and Gardens.

Among Walpole House's famous inhabitants have been: Barbara, Duchess of Cleveland, mistress of King Charles II; Thomas Walpole; Daniel O'Connell; William Makepeace Thackeray; and Sir Herbert Beerbohm Tree.

== Property ==
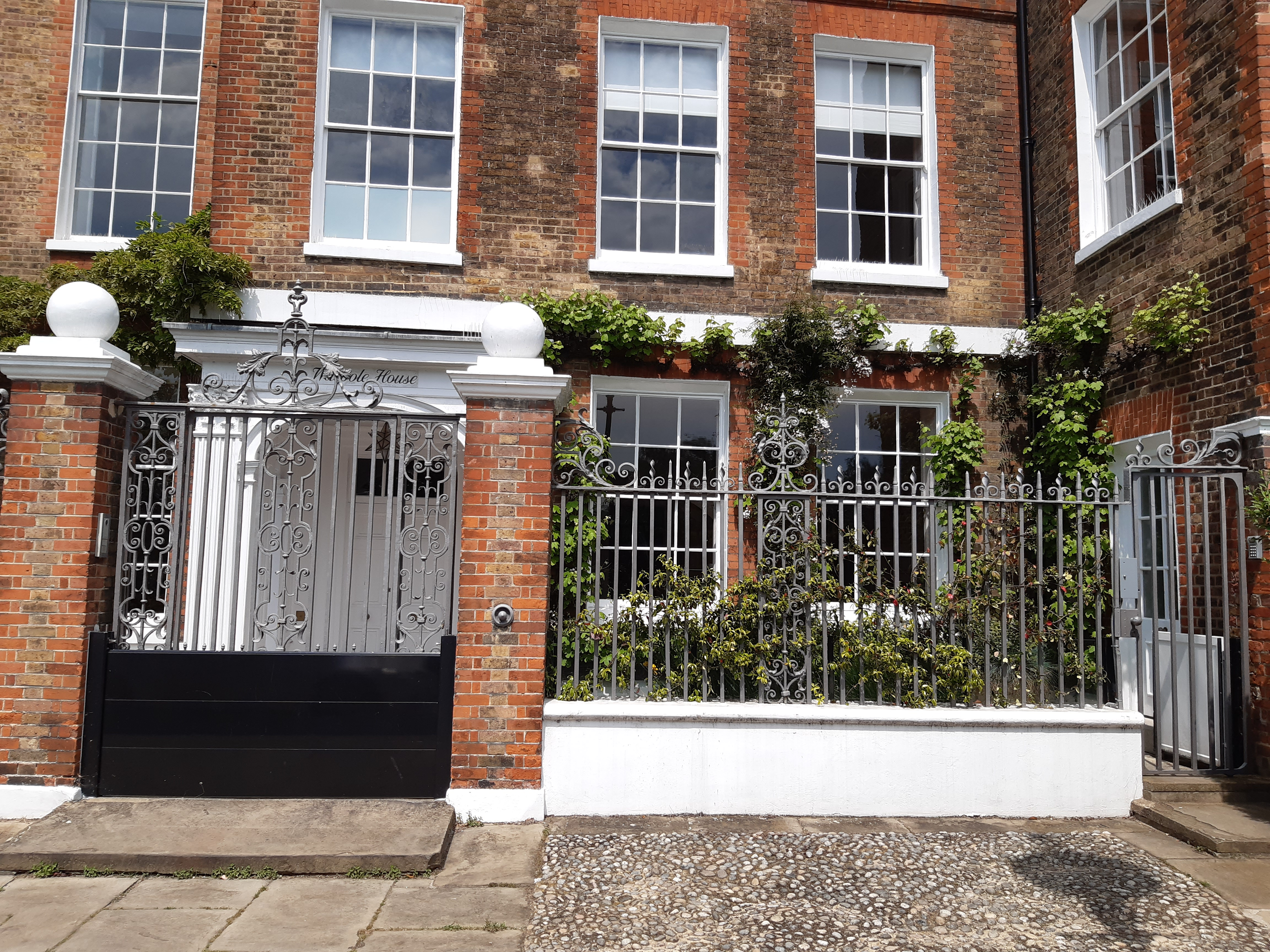
Walpole House's Grade II listed wrought iron gate and screen (one side shown)

=== House ===
The building that became Walpole House was built late in the Tudor era; internal features survive from the 16th and 17th centuries. The garden front was constructed around 1700, while the river frontage and the extension on the northwest side were added around 1730. It has three storeys, of brown bricks with red brick dressings. The front door is in a round-arched porch with Corinthian pilasters standing on plinths; above is an entablature. Its windows have double-hung sashes topped with flat arches.

The house is private and there is no access for the public.

=== Screen ===
In front of the house is an elegant Grade II* listed screen and wrought iron gate; the brick gateposts are topped with white globes, ball finials.

=== Garden ===
Walpole House garden is listed in the English Heritage Register of Parks and Gardens. It is L-shaped and of some 0.5 hectares (1.2 acres); it runs northwest from the house to the boundary wall at Netheravon Road, and is bordered by the back garden walls of The Tides and Thamescote House to the west, and Strawberry House to the east. At the back of the house is a terrace of York stone which occupies the full width of the house, as designed around 1926 by Mrs Robert Benson. Three steps rise to the lower lawn; a wide path paved with flagstones runs northwest across the lawn. The lower lawn is bordered by raised curved flowerbeds edged with flagstones; to the west of the stone path is a large mulberry tree. Five steps rise to the upper lawn, and the path crosses the upper garden. Above the stone wall separating the lawns are rosebeds. The upper garden has a pair of large poplar trees from Mrs Benson's design, and a large pond surrounded by flagstones and raised flowerbeds. The lawn ends at a 1997 yew hedge the full width of the garden; behind it, reached through two gaps in the hedge, is a wild garden containing large eucalyptus and Snakebark maple trees. Under the trees are flowers including cyclamens, euphorbias, and hellebores.

The back boundary wall is Grade II listed; it is described as "of plum-red brick about 9-10 ft high" with "some black headers". It tapers at the top and is capped with brick. The listing states that it is the remaining part of the boundary of College House, where the scholars of Westminster School came to escape the plague starting in 1557.

== History ==
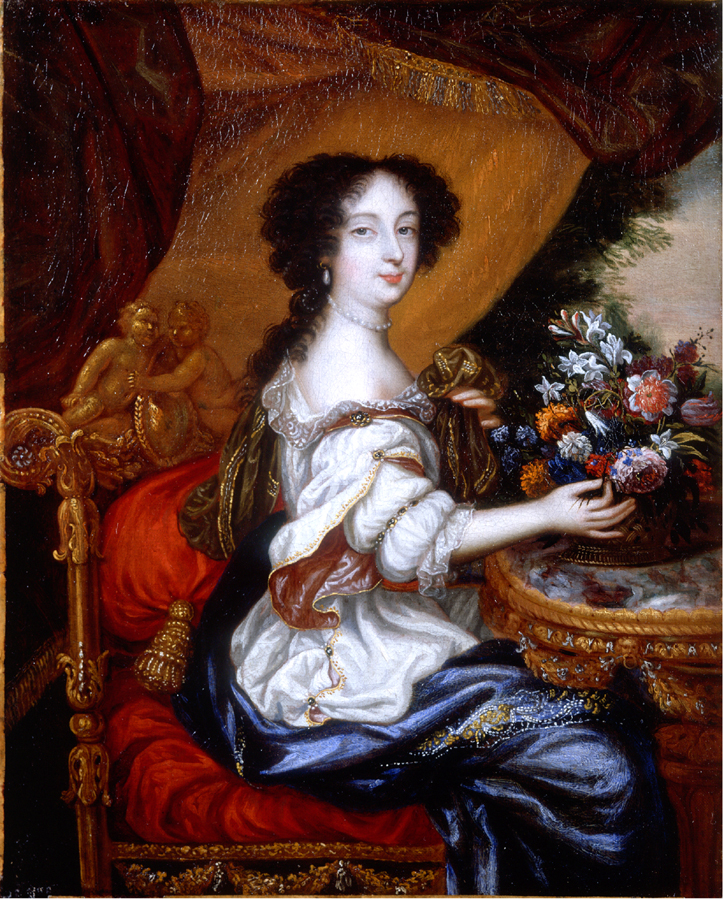
Barbara, 1st Duchess of Cleveland and mistress of King Charles II, lived out her last years in Walpole House. Portrait by Henri Gascar

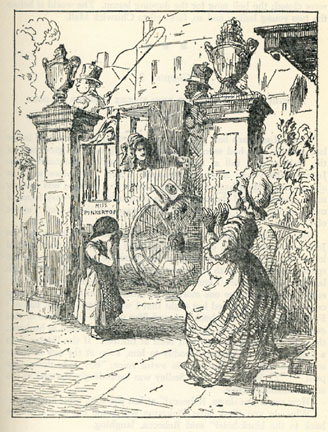
"A large family coach" arrives at Miss Pinkerton's school house on Chiswick Mall. 1861 illustration for Thackeray's Vanity Fair

Walpole House was the last home of Barbara, 1st Duchess of Cleveland, a notorious royal mistress of King Charles II, until her death in 1709; she is buried in St Nicholas Church nearby. The house was later inherited by Thomas Walpole, a Member of Parliament and banker, for whom it is now named. From 1785 to 1794, it served as a boarding house; one of its lodgers was the young Irish politician Daniel O'Connell while he was studying law.

In the early 19th century, the house became a boys' school, its pupils including William Makepeace Thackeray. Walpole House most likely provided the model for the fictional academy for young ladies in his 1847–48 novel Vanity Fair, which begins with the words "While the present century was in its teens, and on one sunshiny morning in June, there drove up to the great iron gate of Miss Pinkerton’s academy for young ladies, on Chiswick Mall, a large family coach, with two fat horses in blazing harness, driven by a fat coachman in a three-cornered hat and wig, at the rate of four miles an hour. ... as he pulled the bell at least a score of young heads were seen peering out of the narrow windows of the stately old brick house."

The actor-manager Sir Herbert Beerbohm Tree owned the house at the start of the 20th century. It was then bought by the merchant banker Robin Benson; over several generations the Benson family designed and then restored the garden. The house was reacquired by the Walpole family at the end of the 20th century.

== General sources ==
- Bolton, Diane K.; Croot, Patricia E. C.; Hicks, M. A. (1982). "Chiswick: Growth". In T. F. T. Baker; C. R. Elrington (eds.). A History of the County of Middlesex, Volume 7, Acton, Chiswick, Ealing and Brentford, West Twyford, Willesden. London: British History Online. pp. 54–68.
- Clegg, Gill (2021). "Grand Houses". Brentford & Chiswick Local History Society.
- Hounslow (November 2018). OLD CHISWICK: Conservation Area Appraisal: Consultation Draft (PDF). London Borough of Hounslow. Archived from the original (PDF) on 7 December 2020.
