= Thomas Walpole =

British MP and banker

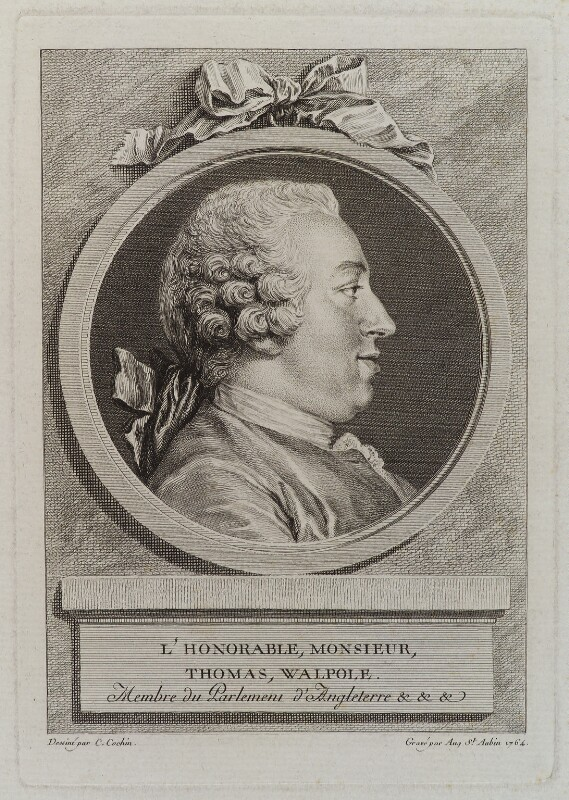
Thomas Walpole, 1764 engraving

Thomas Walpole (6 October 1727 – March 1803), styled from 1756 The Hon. Thomas Walpole, was a British MP and banker in Paris.

== Life ==
Thomas Walpole was born into a political family. The second son of the 1st Baron Walpole and his wife Telisha, nee Lombard, he was the nephew of Sir Robert Walpole, the prime minister from 1721 to 1742.

Walpole entered into partnership with the merchant Sir Joshua Vanneck, and married his daughter Elizabeth Vanneck on 14 November 1753. She died on 9 June 1760.

He was MP for Sudbury from 1754 to 1761, and MP for Ashburton from 1761 to 1768. In 1762 he was involved in efforts to engineer William Pitt the Elder into a rapprochement with the Duke of Newcastle. In 1768 he succeeded his cousin Horace Walpole as MP for Lynn, sitting until 1784, when he was succeeded by his nephew Horatio Walpole.

From 1753 to 1754 he served as a Director of the East India Company. In the early 1770s Walpole led a group of investors, including Benjamin Franklin, to seek from the crown a land grant in Ohio.

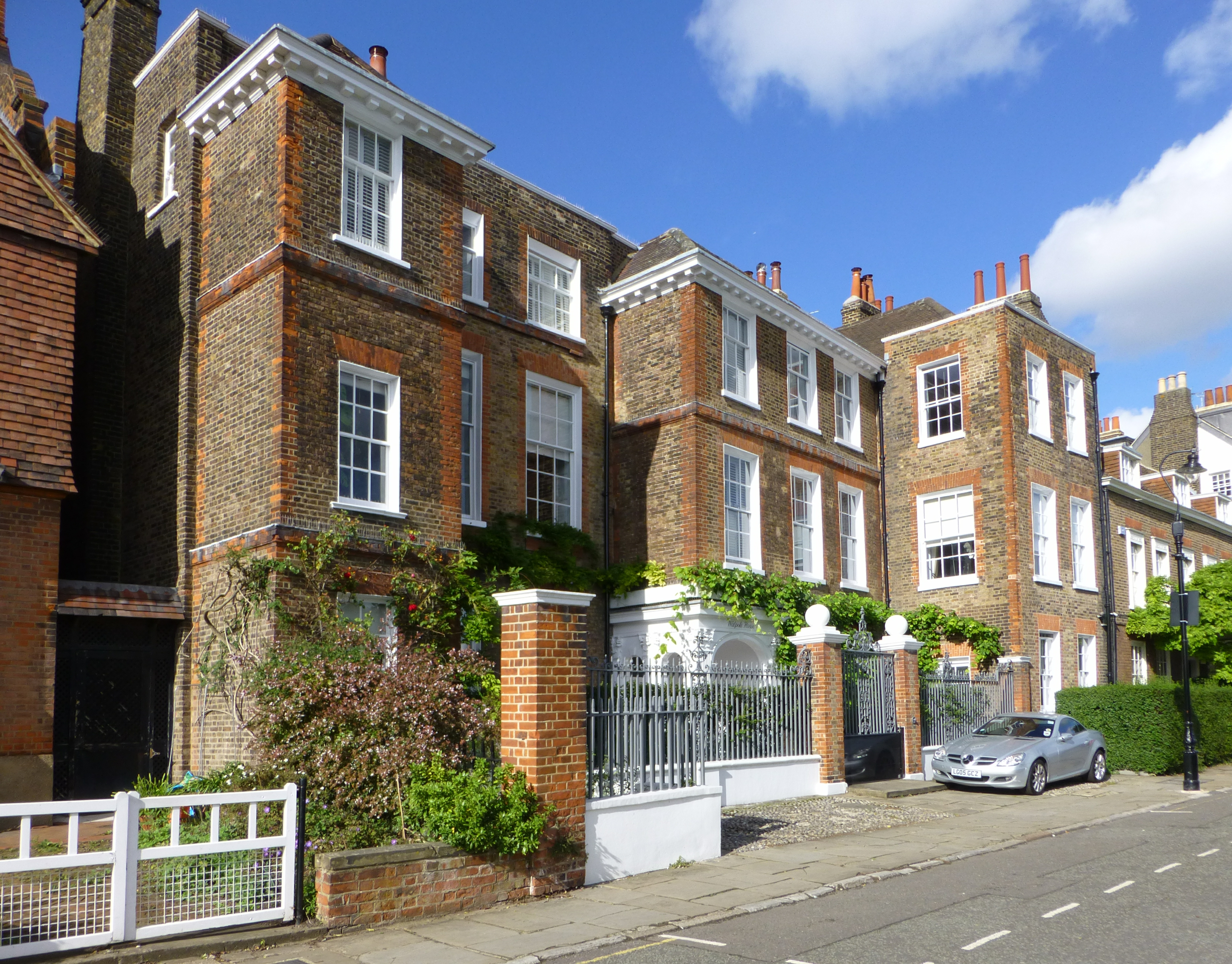
Walpole House, Chiswick Mall

He was a slave owner on Grenada and Tobago.

In 1787 he married his second wife, Jeanne-Marguerite Batailhe de Montval. From 1799 until his death Walpole lived in a large house, today named Walpole House, on Chiswick Mall, Chiswick.

His son Thomas (1755–1840) was British Ambassador to Munich.

Parliament of Great Britain
Preceded by Richard Rigby; Thomas Fonnereau	Member of Parliament for Sudbury; 1754–1761; With: Thomas Fonnereau	Succeeded by John Henniker; Thomas Fonnereau
Preceded by Viscount Midleton; John Harris	Member of Parliament for Ashburton; 1761–1768; With: John Harris 1761–1767; Robert Palk 1767–1768	Succeeded by Charles Boone; Laurence Sulivan
Preceded by Horace Walpole; Sir John Turner, Bt	Member of Parliament for Lynn; 1768–1784; With: Sir John Turner, Bt 1768–1774; Crisp Molineux 1774–1784	Succeeded by Horatio Walpole; Crisp Molineux
