= John Bowack =

John Bowack (fl. 1737) was a British topographer, who was for many years a writing-master at Westminster School.

In 1705–6, when living in Church Lane, Chelsea, he began to publish, in folio numbers, The Antiquities of Middlesex, being a collection of the several church monuments in that county; also an historical account of each church and parish, with the seats, villages, and names of the most eminent inhabitants. Of this work two parts appeared, comprising the parishes of Chelsea, Kensington, Fulham, Hammersmith, Chiswick, and Acton. A third part was promised, which would have extended through Ealing, New Brentford, Isleworth, and Hanwell; but from want of encouragement Bowack proceeded no further.

A specimen of his skill in ornamental handwriting is to be seen in British Library Harley MS 1809, a thin vellum book, containing two neat drawings in Indian ink, and various kinds of English text and print hands, which was sent to Lord Oxford in December 1712, with a letter, wherein the author expresses the hope that his little work may find a place in his lordship's library. Bowack was appointed in July 1732 clerk to the commissioners of the turnpike roads, and in 1737 assistant-secretary to the Westminster Bridge commissioners, with a salary of £100 a year. The date of his death appears to be unknown.
