= Little Sutton, Chiswick =

Coordinates: 51.487°N 0.271°W

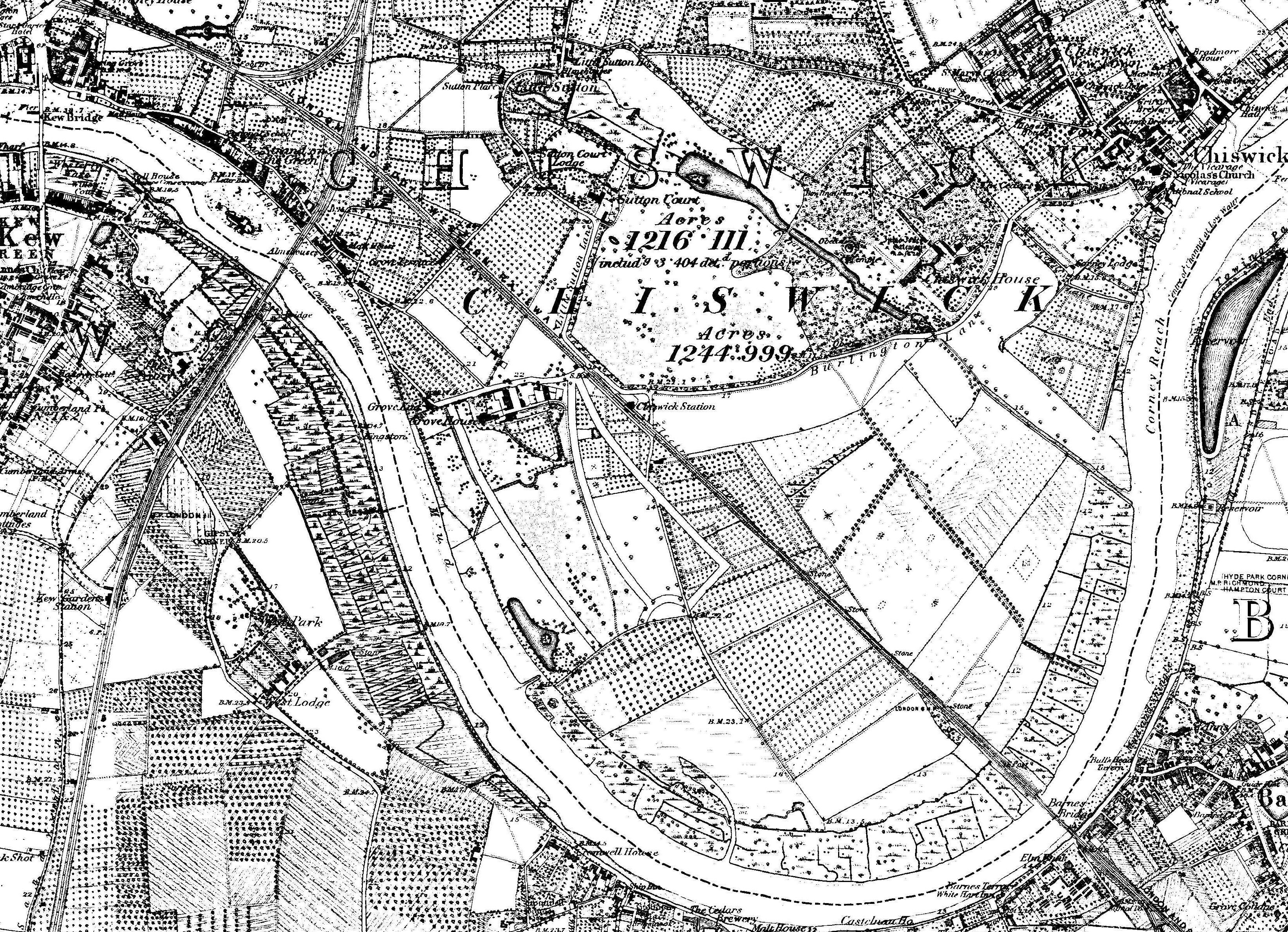
Little Sutton area on Ordnance Survey map, c. 1880. Little Sutton is top centre; Kew Bridge and Strand-on-the-Green top left; Chiswick House and Gardens top centre right, and Old Chiswick top right. Grove House and its Park are centre left between the river and the railway leading to Barnes Railway Bridge. A broad strip beside the river is marked as marsh; much of the peninsula is shown as orchard (arrays of dots) or open fields.

Little Sutton was one of the four constituent medieval villages of Chiswick, in what is now West London, and the site of a royal manor house, Sutton Manor, later Sutton Court. The great house was accompanied by a small hamlet without a church of its own.

The manor was used by four kings of England, Richard II, Henry IV, Henry V, and Henry VI, and Mary, Oliver Cromwell's daughter, lived there. The name survives in local street and house names.

== Geography ==
Much of the area was still rural until late in the 19th century. Little Sutton, one of the four constituent villages of Chiswick, was about the centre of the parish of Chiswick at that time; Strand-on-the-Green lies to the west, Old Chiswick to the east, and Turnham Green to the north. It is now part of the Grove Park district.

== History ==
=== Sutton Manor ===
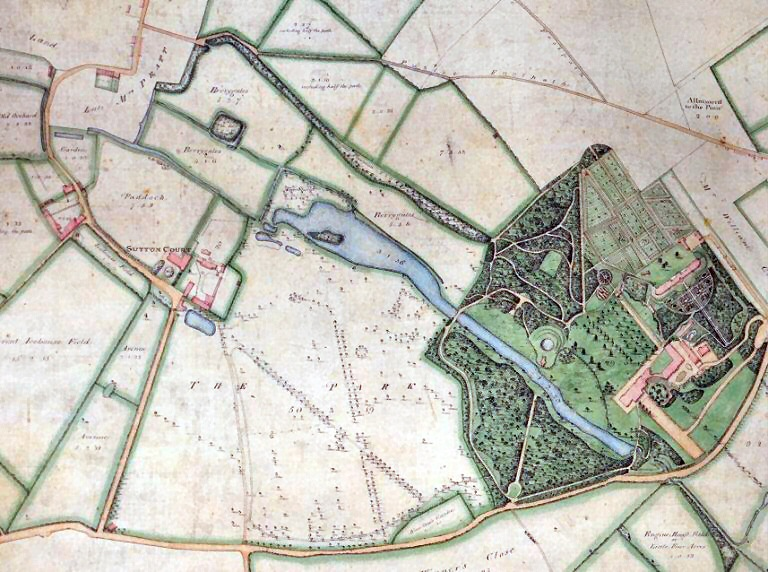
Map of Sutton Court and Chiswick House by Peter Potter, 1818. Chiswick House is on the right in its landscaped grounds (dark green); the "river" (blue) is the remodelled Bollo Brook, and Fauconberg's "The Park" (white), acquired by Burlington for Chiswick House below it. Sutton Court is left centre, the old moated house enclosure to its north, and its fields just across the curving lane (now Fauconberg Road).

Sutton Manor is recorded from 1181. The lands of Sutton and Chiswick had by then already been given as an endowment for the Bishop of London and St Paul's Cathedral. It consisted of about half a square mile of arable fields and small areas of meadow and woods. In 1458 it had its own watermill. It was a Crown holding in the 14th and 15 centuries; in 1396, king Richard II built a royal residence here, complete with a chapel, a hall, and a moat. The house was used by kings Henry IV and Henry V; Henry VI used a later house from at least 1441–1443. Others who used the house included Sir Thomas More, Lord High Chancellor to Henry VIII, in 1524; the speaker of the House of Commons Chaloner Chute, in 1639; and Thomas Belasyse, Viscount Fauconberg in 1675; his wife, Mary, Oliver Cromwell's daughter, lived in the house until 1713, and is buried in St Nicholas Church, Chiswick. By 1589 the great house was accompanied by farm buildings, a malthouse, and a gatehouse, with 3 acres of gardens and orchards. By 1674 the walled garden extended to 12 acres, and by 1691 the gardens included a bowling green and a maze. The field around the old moated enclosure was called Berry-gates until at least 1818. for "gated burh", a fortified place; the name survives in the nearby Barrowgate Road.

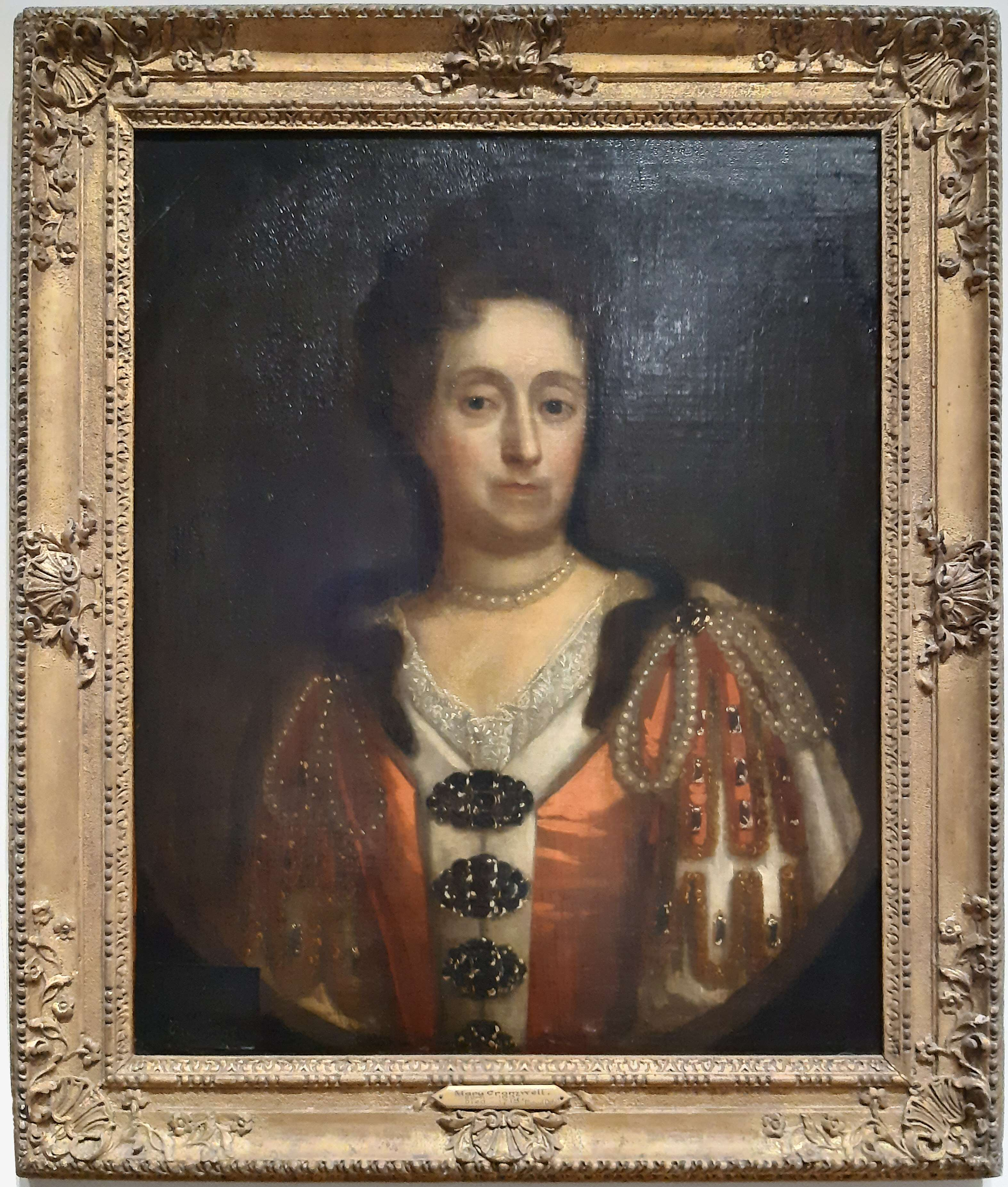
Mary Cromwell, Countess Fauconberg, lived in Sutton Manor from 1676 to her death in 1713. Portrait by circle of Thomas Murray, c. 1700

=== Sutton Court ===
In 1795 the house was remodelled as Sutton Court; it stood to the south of the former moated house, at what is now the corner of Sutton Court Road and Fauconberg Road. In 1845 it served as a boy's boarding school, run by Frederick Tappenden. It was demolished and replaced by the "Sutton Court Mansions" block of flats in 1905.

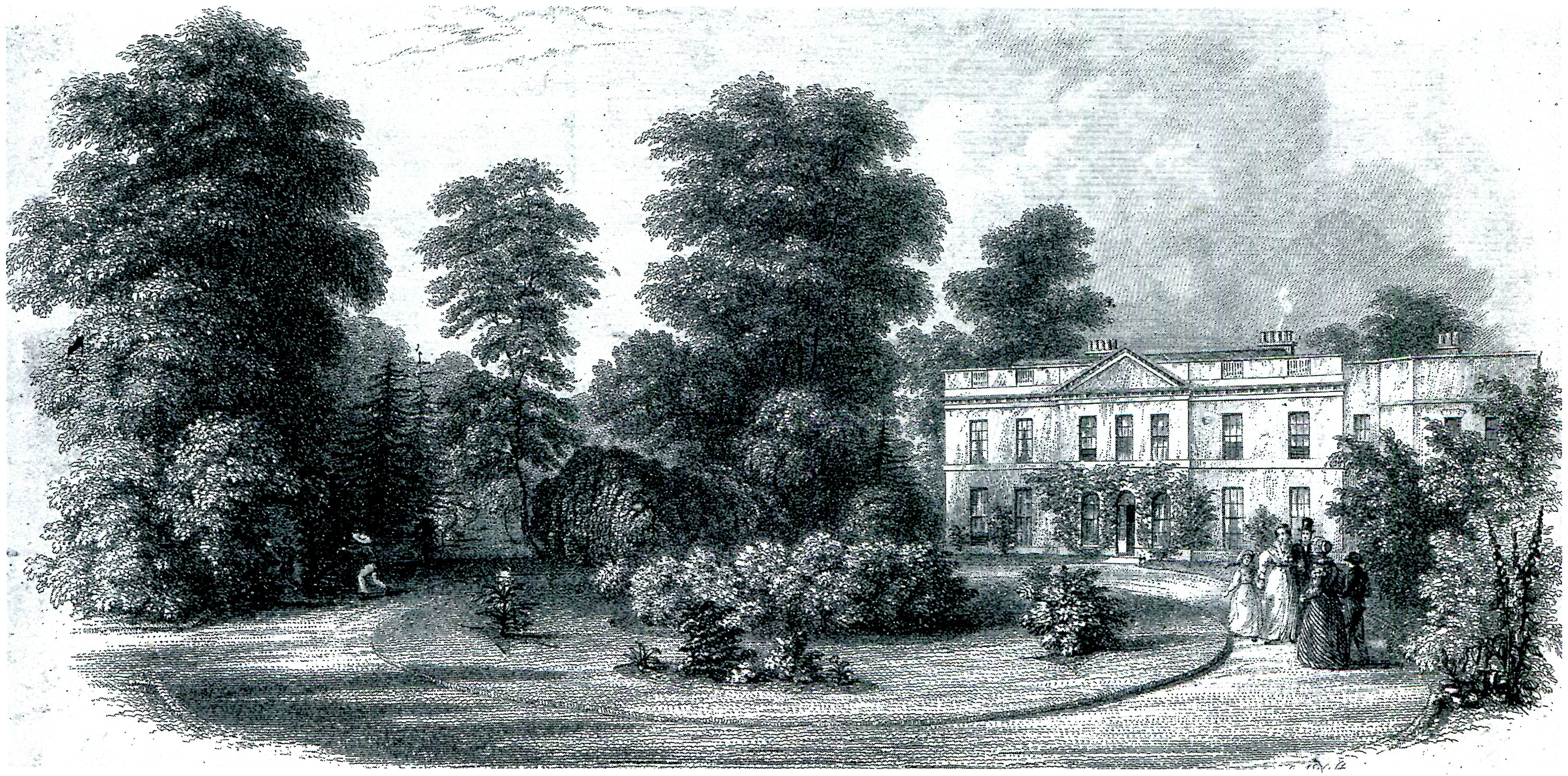
Sutton Court, the remodelled manor house, 1844

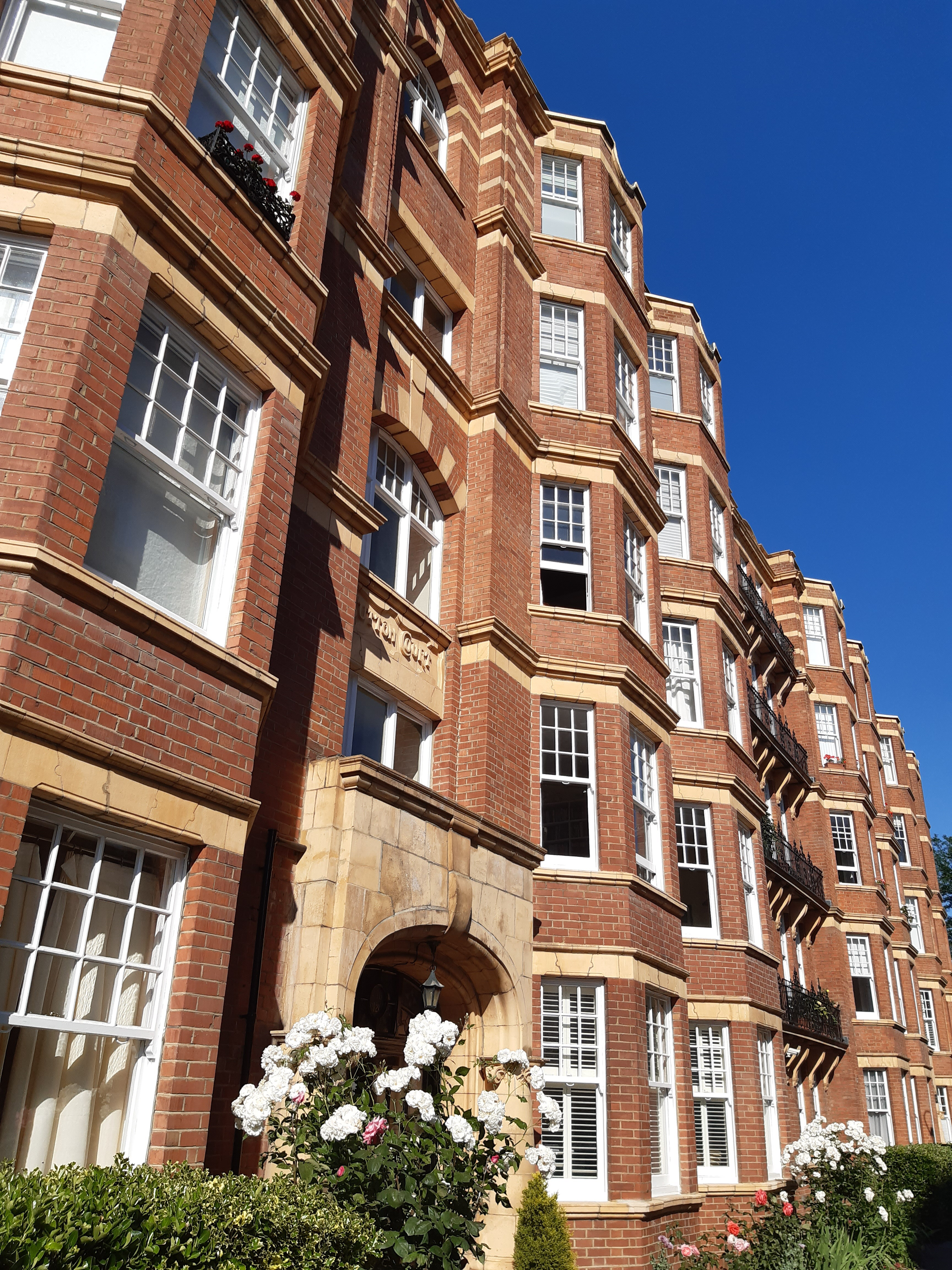
Sutton Court Mansions, Fauconberg Road, 1905

=== Little Sutton ===
Little Sutton was never more than a small hamlet without a church; by 1703 there were some almshouses, and there appears to have been an inn named the Queen's Head, documented in 1722 and 1862 (if they were the same building). It was simply named Sutton in 1181; this developed into "Sutton Chiswick" or "Sutton by Chiswick" in the 14th and 15th centuries; "Sutton Beauregard" in the 1450s, for the view south over the river to the Surrey hills when the manor (later called Sutton Court) belonged to the Crown; and finally Little Sutton by 1590. By 1801 there were 14 houses in Little Sutton. One building, the 1676 Little Sutton Cottage, survives on Sutton Lane South, facing the main A4 dual carriageway; it is now Grade II listed. The village inn, the Queen's Head, is on Sutton Lane North, just across the A4. The building dates from 1676. It was a pub named The Queen's Head in 1722; the pub architect Nowell Parr rebuilt it in 1925 in Brewer's Tudor style as The Hole in the Wall; after various name changes it was again The Hole in the Wall in 2024, but closed suddenly in June 2026. Work began in October 2026 to restore and reopen the pub.

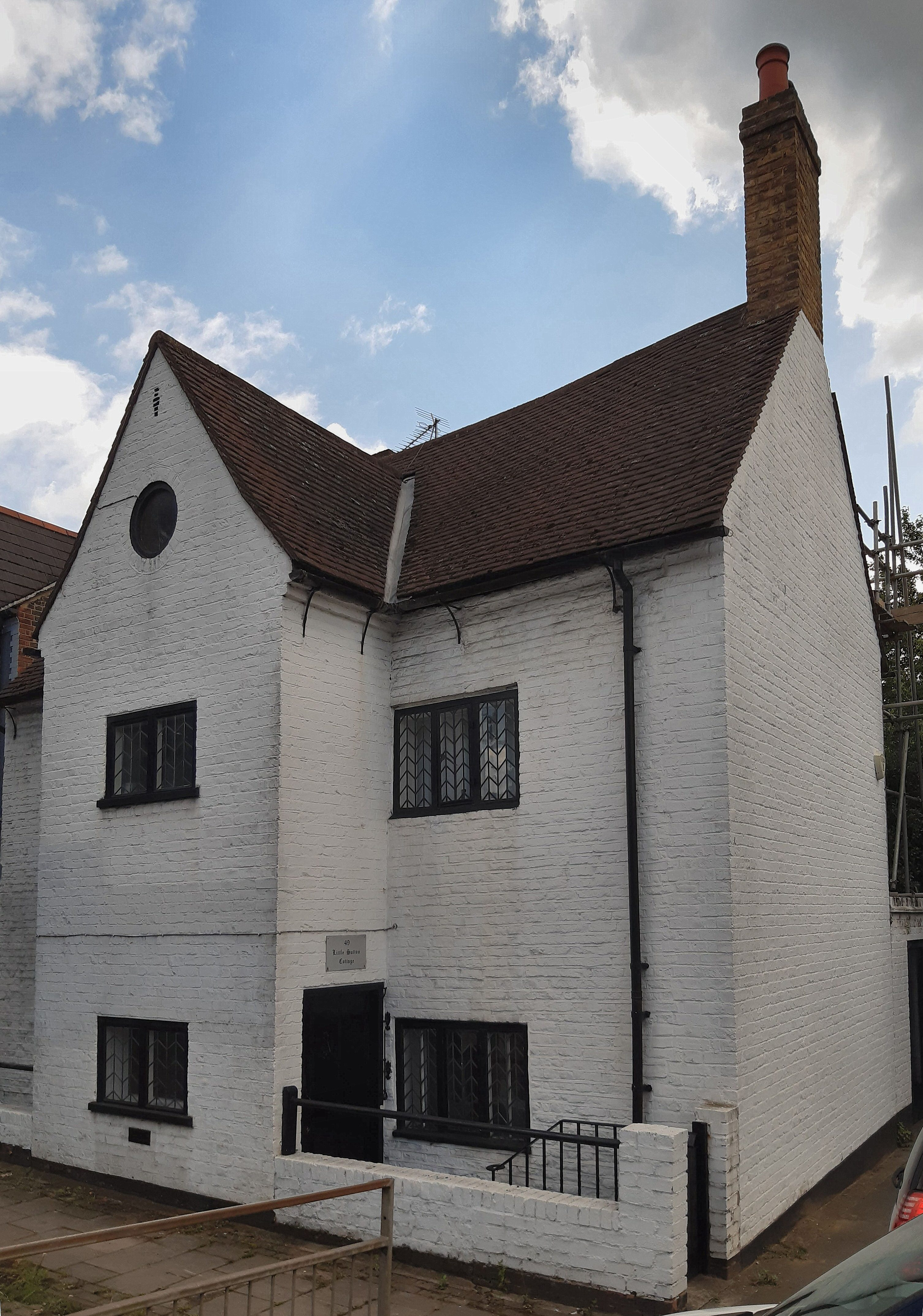
Little Sutton Cottage, 1676

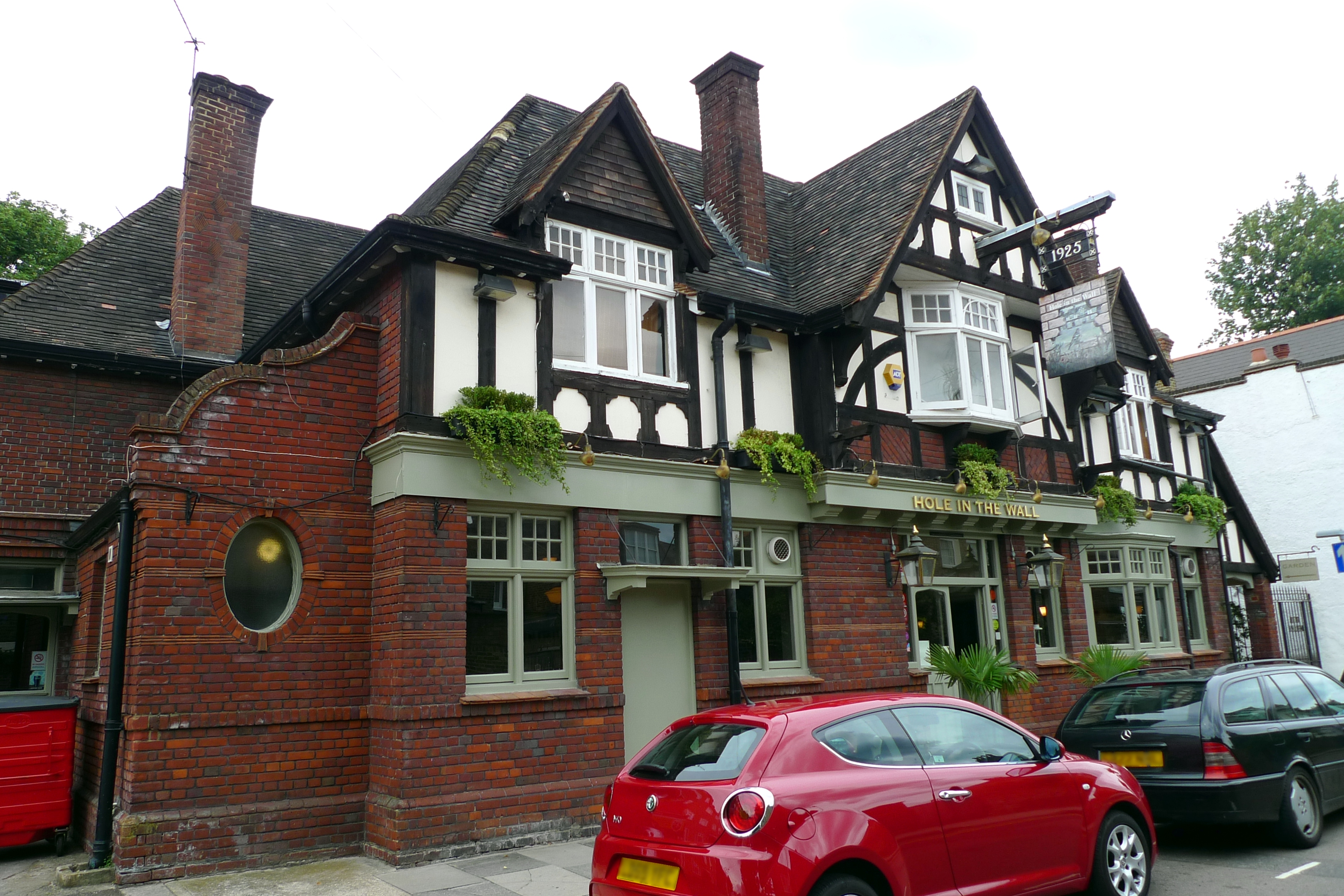
The Hole in the Wall, 1925,
formerly the Queen's Head, 1722

== Sources ==
- Anderson, James (1862). Memorable Women of the Puritan Times. Vol. 2. Blackie and Son.
- Baker, T. F. T.; et al. (1982). "Chiswick: Growth". A History of the County of Middlesex: Volume 7: Acton, Chiswick, Ealing and Brentford, West Twyford, Willesden. British History Online.
- Clegg, Gillian (1995). Chiswick Past. Historical Publications. ISBN 0-94866-733-8.
- Wisdom, James (2008). "Sutton Court, the Earl of Burlington & Chiswick House Grounds". Brentford and Chiswick Local History Society Journal (17).
