= Fauconberg House =

Coordinates: 51.5156°N 0.1315°W

Fauconberg House was a house in Soho Square in the City of Westminster, London. It was demolished in 1924.

The house was occupied from 1683 to 1700 by Thomas Belasyse, 1st Earl Fauconberg. The last member of the Fauconberg family to live at the house was Mary Cromwell; she was the third daughter of Oliver Cromwell and the wife of the 1st Earl Fauconberg.

Subsequently it was occupied by Arthur Onslow, then Speaker of the House of Commons. The lease was sold by Onslow to John Campbell, 4th Duke of Argyll. The Duke of Argyll lived at Fauconberg House until his death in 1770; following his death, it was sold to John Grant, a Scottish lawyer and owner of sugar plantations in the West Indies. The neo-classical architect Robert Adam was commissioned by Grant to improve the house. After Grant's death, Fauconberg House became Wright's Hotel and Coffee House.

The house belonged to a company of musical instrument makers at the start of the 19th century, and was owned by Crosse & Blackwell from 1858. Fauconberg House was demolished by Crosse & Blackwell in 1924, and their new headquarters was built on the site.
