= Mary Cromwell, Countess Fauconberg =

Eighth child of Oliver Cromwell, Lord Protector and Elizabeth Cromwell (née Bourchier)

The Right Honourable The Countess Fauconberg
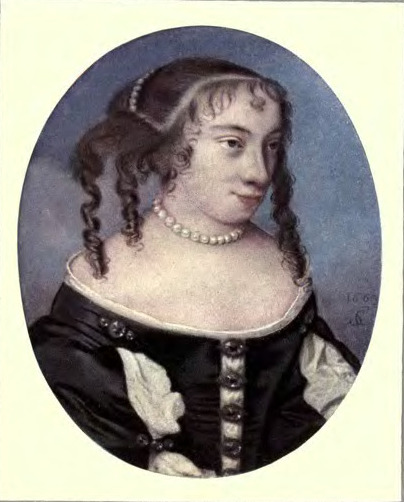
- portrait miniature by Samuel Cooper
- Baptised: 9 February 1637
- Died: 14 March 1713
- Burial place: St Nicholas Church, Chiswick
- Spouse: Thomas Belasyse, 1st Earl Fauconberg
- Parent(s): Oliver Cromwell; Elizabeth Bourchier
- Relatives: Cromwell family

Mary Cromwell, Countess Fauconberg (9 February 1637 (christened) – 14 March 1713) was an English noblewoman, the third daughter of Oliver Cromwell and his wife Elizabeth Bourchier.

== Biography ==
Born in either late 1636 or early 1637, Mary Cromwell was christened on 9 February 1637. On 19 November 1657 she married Thomas Belasyse, 1st Earl Fauconberg (then Viscount Fauconberg), at Hampton Court, and became a Viscountess (later Countess Fauconberg in 1689). Fauconberg had been previously married to Mildred Saunderson, who had died. Lady Fauconberg's residence in London was Fauconberg House which was on the north side of Sutton Street, and on the eastern side of Soho Square.

It has been claimed that, when her father's body was disinterred and symbolically executed at the Restoration, Mary bribed some guards to substitute another body for Cromwell's and to give her the real body, which she arranged to have buried at Newburgh Priory, the family seat of the Fauconbergs.

She died on 14 March 1713 in Sutton Manor in Little Sutton, Chiswick, at the age of 76, and was buried on 24 March in the church of St. Nicholas Church, Chiswick, the district where she had lived since 1676.

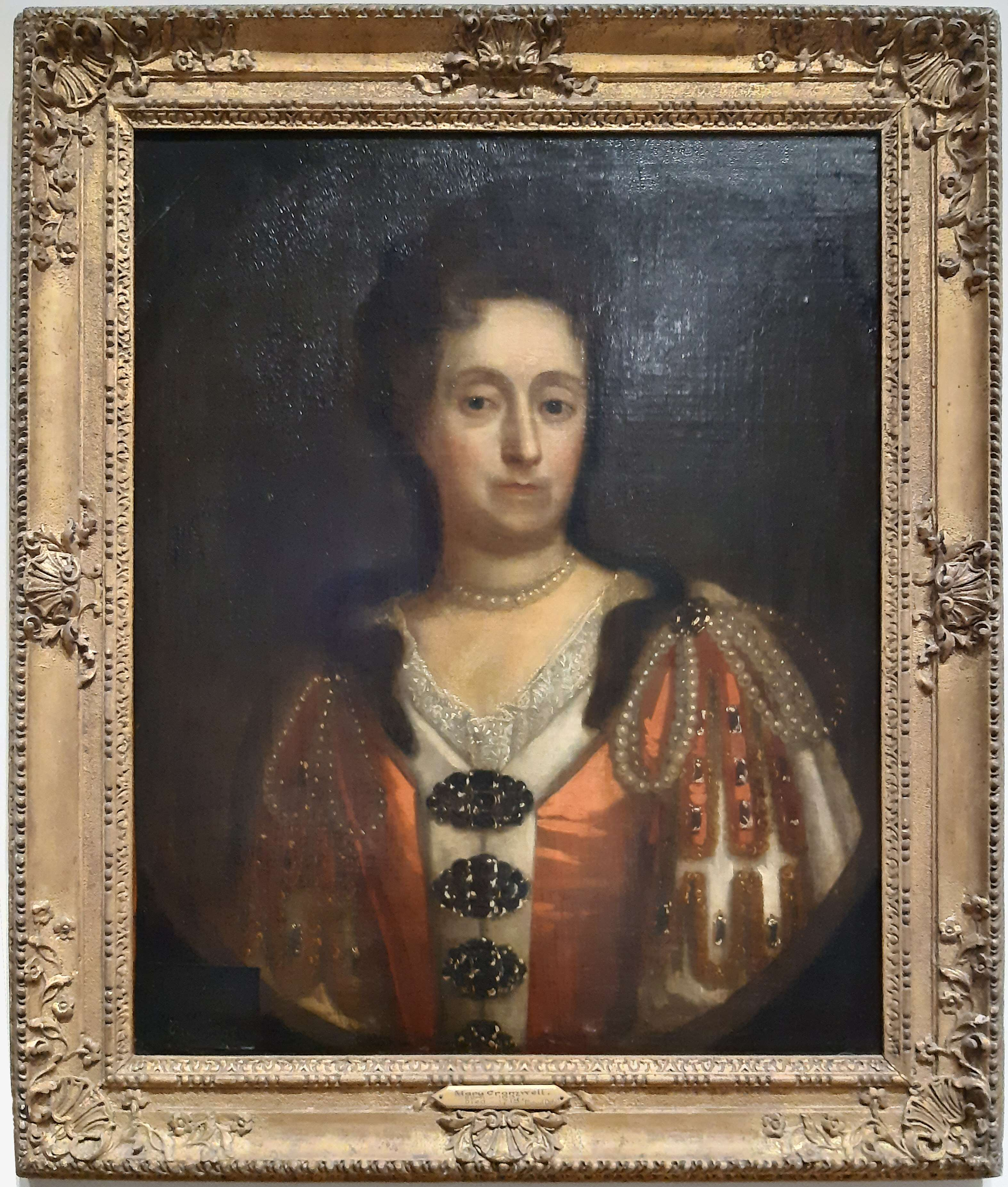
Portrait painting by circle of Thomas Murray, c. 1700

== Sources ==
- Anderson, James (1862). Memorable Women of the Puritan Times. Vol. 2. Blackie and Son.
