= Charles Holland (actor, born 1733) =

English actor

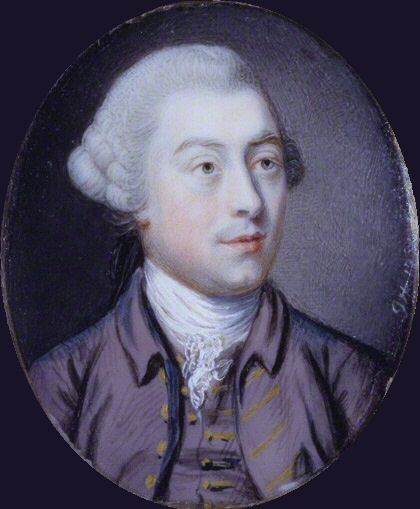
- Miniature portrait by "J.H.", 1760
- Born: 12 March 1733; Chiswick
- Died: 7 December 1769 (aged 36)
- Occupation: Actor

Charles Holland (12 March 1733 – 7 December 1769) was an English actor, born in Chiswick, the son of a baker.

== Life ==
Holland made his first appearance on the stage in the title role of Oroonoko at Drury Lane in 1755, John Palmer, Richard Yates and Susanna Cibber being in the cast. He played under David Garrick, and was the original Florizel in the latter's adaptation of Shakespeare's The Winter's Tale.

Holland died from smallpox at the age of 36. He was engaged to the actress Jane Pope, but she broke off the engagement when she found him boating at Richmond with the actress Sophia Baddeley. (Note: Literary accounts of the betrothal were given by James Smith, and then John Doran.) He was known for having affairs; the one with Mrs K. Earle led her husband, William Earle, to prosecute Holland successfully.

Garrick thought highly of him, and wrote a eulogistic epitaph for his monument in St Nicholas Church, Chiswick. (Note: Garrick's epitaph on Holland runs "If Talents to make entertainment instructive to support the credit of the Stage by just and manly Action If to adorn Society by Virtues which would honour any Rank and Profession deserve remembrance Let Him with whom these Talents were long exerted To whom these Virtues were well known And by whom the loss of them will be long lamented bear testimony to the Worth and Abilities of his departed Friend Charles Holland who was born 12 March 1733 dy'd 7 December 1769 and was buried near this place. D. Garrick".) His tomb was sculpted by William Tyler RA.

His nephew, Charles Holland (1768–1849?) was also an actor, who played with Sarah Siddons and Edmund Kean.
