= St Nicholas Church, Chiswick =

- The Parish Church of Saint Nicholas
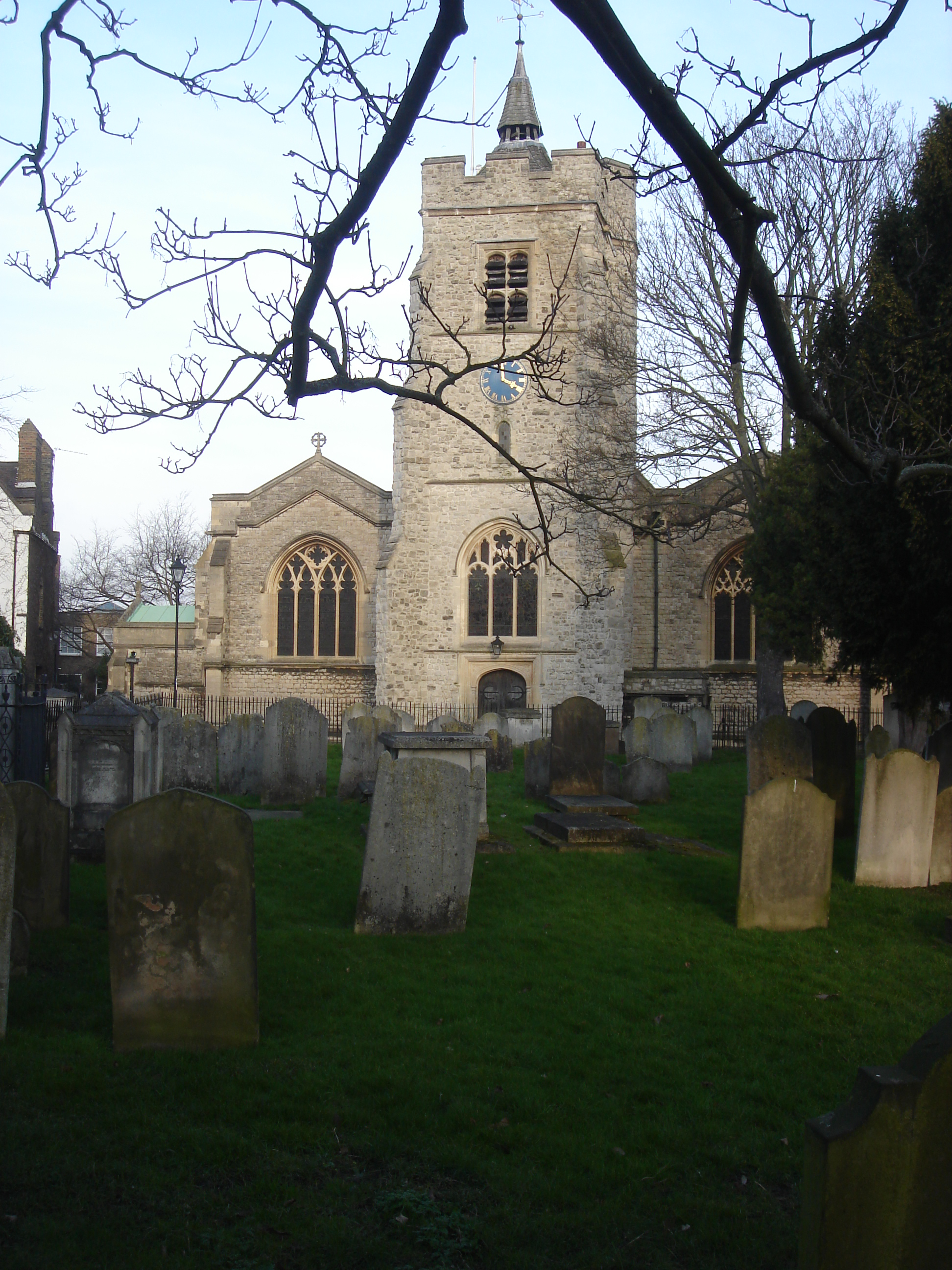
- Exterior view
- St Nicholas Church, Chiswick
- region:GB 51.4860°N 0.2506°W
- Location: Church Street, Chiswick, London
- Country: England
- Denomination: Church of England
- Website: stnicholaschiswick.org

History
- Status: Parish church

Architecture
- Functional status: Active

Administration
- Diocese: London
- Archdeaconry: Middlesex
- Deanery: Hounslow
- Parish: St Nicholas with St Mary Magdalene, Chiswick

Clergy
- Vicar: Simon Brandes

Listed Building – Grade II*
- Designated: 11 July 1951
- Reference no.: 1189405

St Nicholas Church, Chiswick, is an English Anglican parish church. The Grade II* listed church is in Church Street, Chiswick, London, near the River Thames. Old Chiswick developed as a village around the church from c. 1181. The tower was built at some time between 1416 and 1435.

The current church dates from 1882 to 1884, when most of the building except the tower was demolished and rebuilt at the expense of the brewer Henry Smith of the nearby Fuller, Smith and Turner brewery. Several monuments survive, mainly in the tower. In the churchyard is a monument to the Italian poet and patriot Ugo Foscolo; his remains were returned to Italy, but the Italian government added an inscription to the monument. The painter William Hogarth's monument, near the church, has an epitaph by the actor David Garrick. In the burial ground is the grave of Frederick Hitch, a Victoria Cross recipient and veteran of the Battle of Rorke's Drift.

== History ==
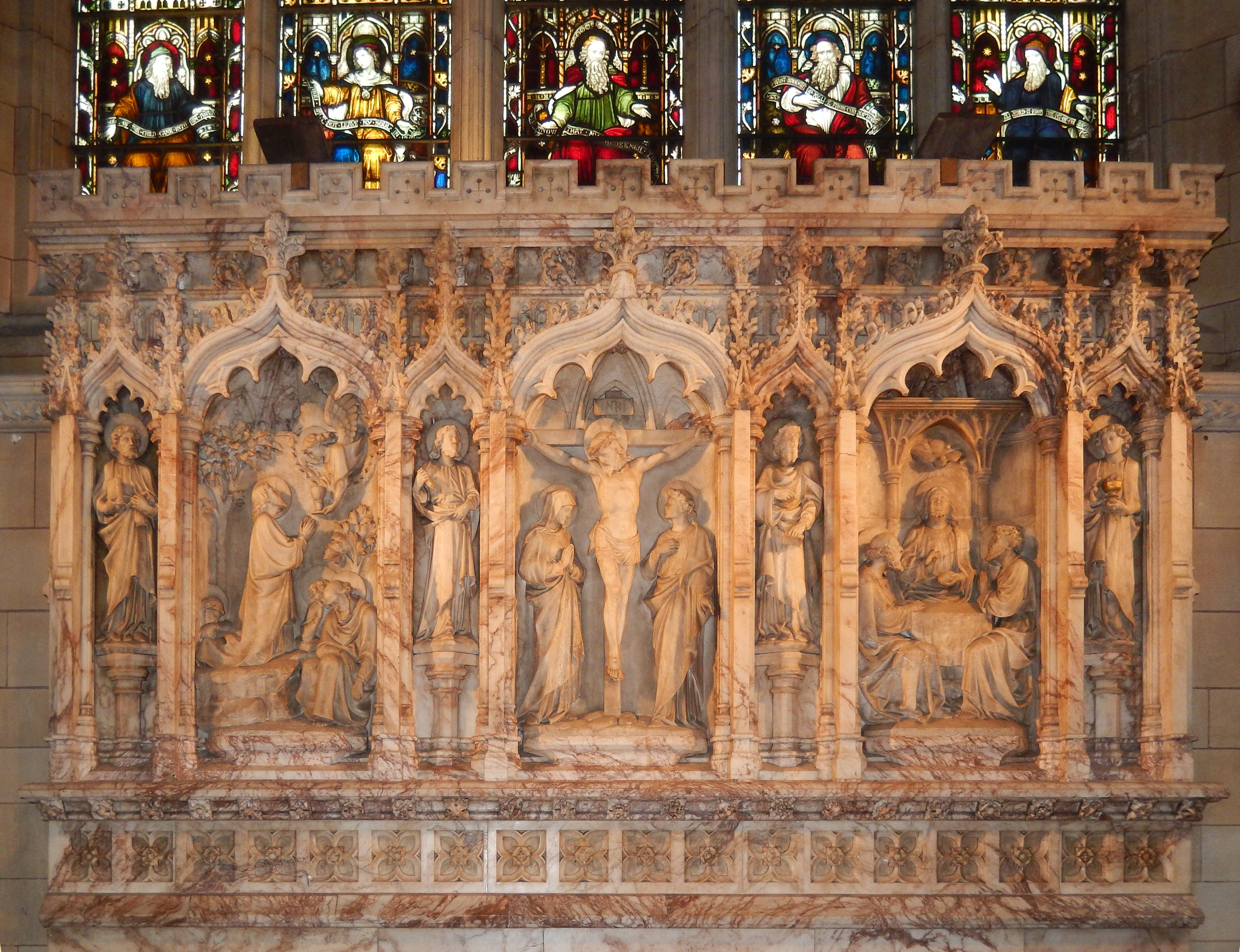
Stone altar screen below the east window

There has been a church on the Chiswick site since at least 1181 in Norman times. The church was formally visited by a senior cleric and an inventory made at "the unusually early date of 1252":

Ornamenta inventa apud Chesewith die Sanctorum Johannis et Pauli Anno Domini M^{o}. CC^{o}. L^{o}. secundo. (Ornaments found at Chiswick on the day of Saints John and Paul, [26 June] 1252 A.D.)

This first inventory lists "a good and sufficient missal sent there from the treasury of St Paul's"; two graduals; a badly bound tropary; an old lectionary; an anthem book; a psalter but not the expected manual. Valuables included a small silver chalice; a red velvet chasuble; two vestments; three corporals; five altar cloths; an arras cloth; an old chrismatory; two brass and two tin candlesticks; and a font without a lock. The chancel roof needed repairing, and the church was at the time not dedicated. Visitations were repeated in 1297 and 1458. Mary Cromwell, Countess Fauconberg, daughter of Oliver Cromwell, was buried in the church on 24 March 1713. More recently, Major Bernard Montgomery, later Field Marshal and 1st Viscount Montgomery of Alamein, married Betty Carver in the church on 27 July 1927.

== Architecture ==
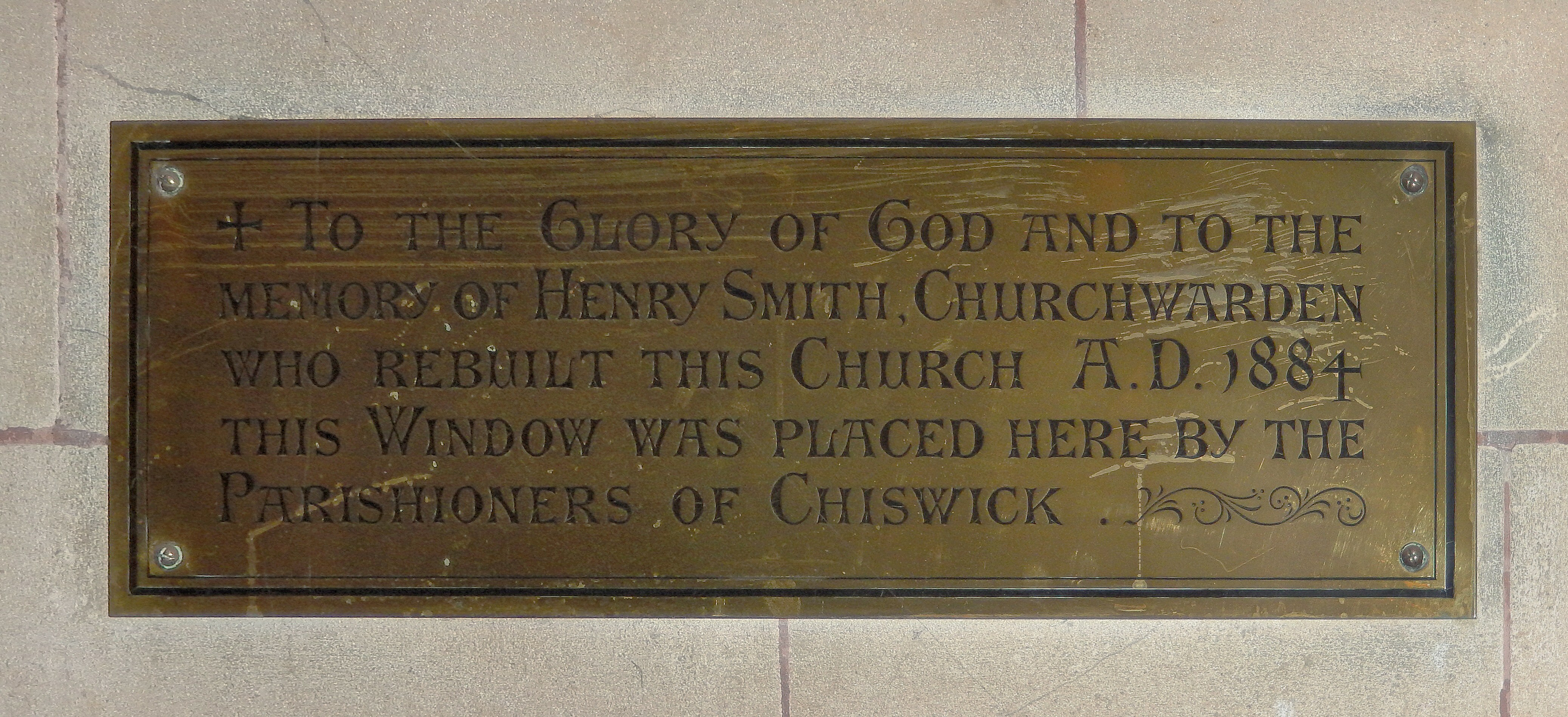
Brass plate commemorating the rebuilding, paid for by the brewer Henry Smith, churchwarden, 1884

The current church dates from 1882 to 1884, when it was rebuilt to a design by the architect John Loughborough Pearson, except for the west tower which was built for William Bordall (vicar 1416–1435). Because of the small distance between the tower and the road at Church Street, Pearson made the nave short but wide, so it is nearly square in plan. The Duke of Devonshire gave £1,000 for the rebuilding, but most of the cost was paid for by Henry Smith of the nearby Griffin Brewery company, Fuller, Smith & Turner. The church is built of courses of squared Kentish ragstone masonry in the Perpendicular style. It has a stone coping with a copper roof.

Inside the church, surviving 15th-century features include the tall archway to the west tower and the hood-mould over the window above the west door.

== Monuments ==
=== Inside the church ===
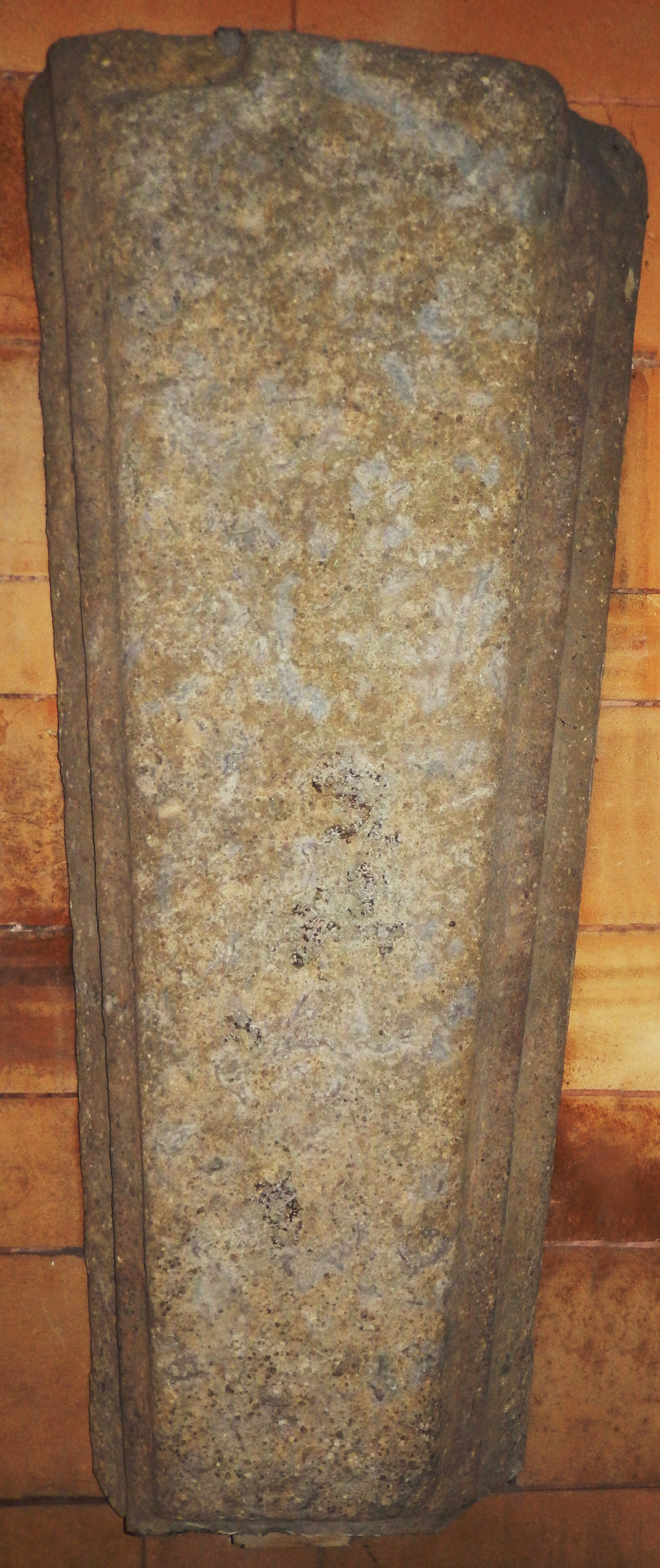
Early English Purbeck Marble foliated cross gravemarker, 1340

The monuments in the church include an unnamed early English foliated cross gravemarker (now in the porch), and the following named memorials:

- Ralph Wenwood, d. 1799, wall tablet in swag surround
- Charlotte Seymour, Duchess of Somerset, d. 1773, wall tablet and urn. She was the second wife of Charles Seymour, 6th Duke of Somerset
- Sir Thomas Chaloner, d. 1615, and his two wives, d. 1603 and 1615, heraldic achievement over baldachino, stone curtains held open by figures on sides; kneeling figures of Sir Thomas and his wife
- Mary Litcott, d. 1599, brass
- Thomas Bentley, d. 1780, representation of sarcophagus by Thomas Scheemakers; Bentley was Josiah Wedgwood's business partner
- Richard Taylor, d. 1698, urn on tasselled swag surround held by cherubs
- Richard Tayler, d. 1716, Corinthian aedicule, heraldic cartouche, statues of Father Time and Angel of Death
- Charles Holland the actor, d. 1769, bust on obelisk, epitaph by the actor David Garrick
- James Howard, d. 1669, flaming urn on Ionic aedicule, inscription panel
- Thomas Plucknett, d. 1721, broken pediment and Ionic aedicule
- John Taylor, d. 1729, open pediment, heraldic achievement in tympanum over Ionic aedicule
- Thomas Tomkins, d. 1816, tablet with medallion portrait
- Charles Barnevett, d. 1695, pedimented wall tablet
- John Beckwith, d. 1815, rectangular fluted tablet

=== In the churchyard and burial ground ===
Among the monuments in the churchyard and the adjacent burial ground are:

- Ugo Foscolo, d. 1812, Italian writer, poet and patriot. In 1871, his remains were taken to Italy, but inscriptions were added to the monument in Chiswick by the Italian government, as part of its campaign of glorification of the new Italian state.
- Percy Harris, (1876 – 1952), Liberal Party politician. His monument is Grade II* listed. The relief carving by Edward Bainbridge Copnall depicts the resurrection of the dead; it was carved in the late 1920s and acquired by Harris for display in his garden at Morton House, Chiswick Mall.
- William Hogarth the painter, d. 1764, and relatives; epitaph poem by David Garrick
- Charles Holland, actor; epitaph by David Garrick
- Henry Joy, d. 1893, trumpeter in the Charge of the Light Brigade
- Philip James de Loutherbourg, d. 1812, landscape painter; mausoleum was designed by Sir John Soane.
- James Abbott McNeill Whistler, d. 1903, artist; a classical tomb in bronze (by the wall)
- Richard Wright, bricklayer to Lord Burlington, owner of Chiswick House
- Frederick Hitch, d. 1913, Victoria Cross recipient and Rorke's Drift veteran
Memorials, arranged by date

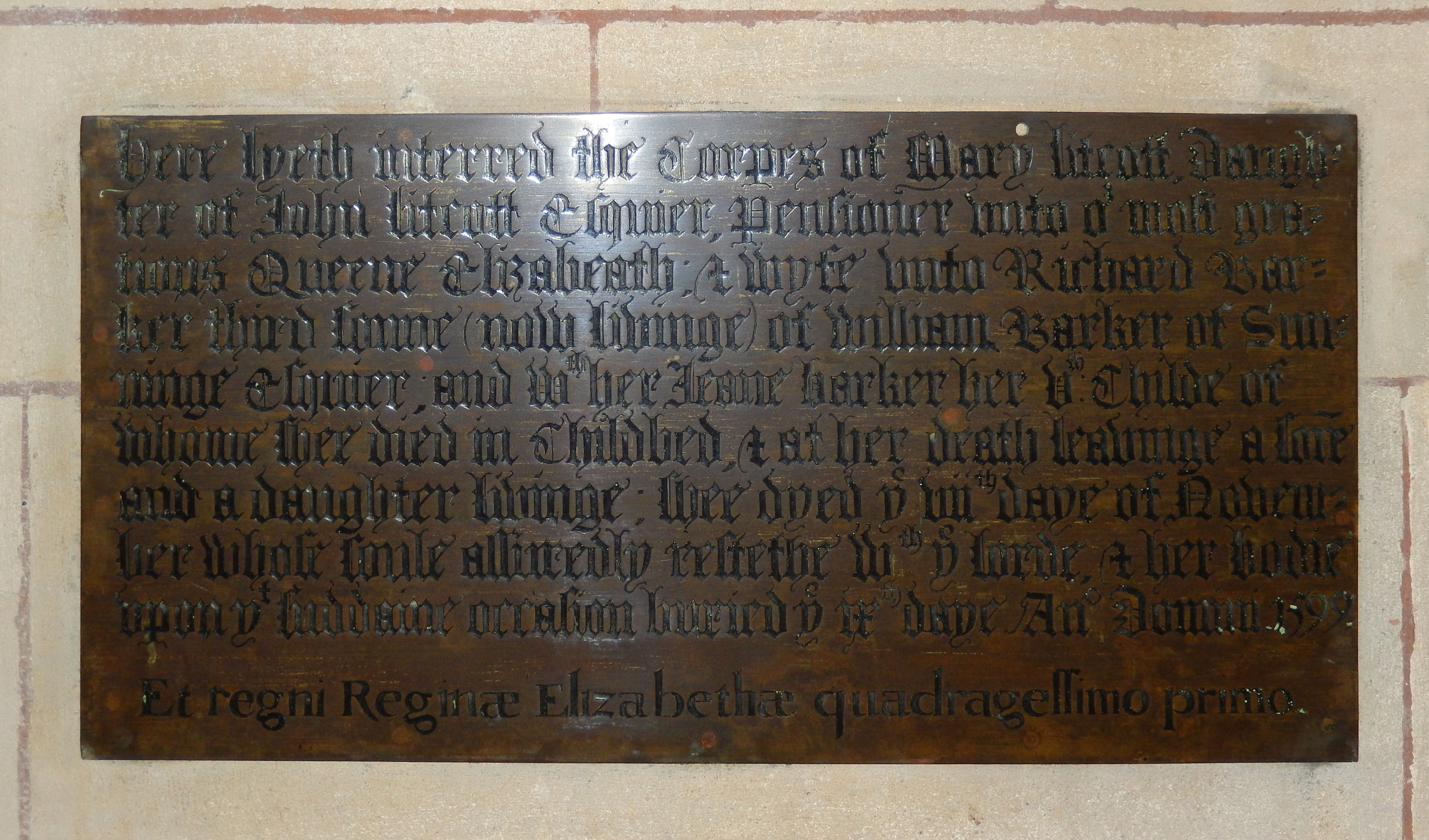
Mary Litcott, 1599

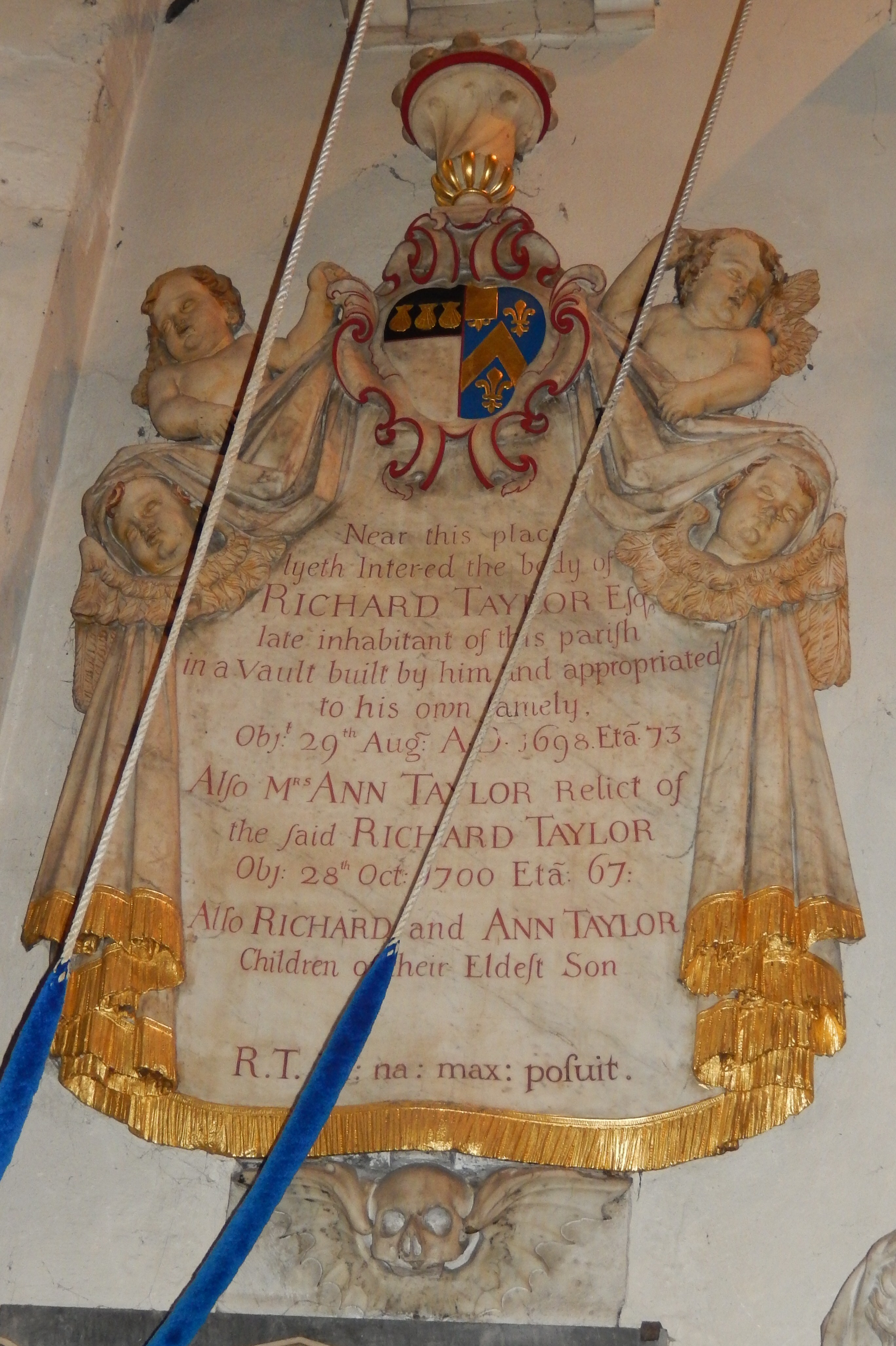
Richard Taylor, 1698

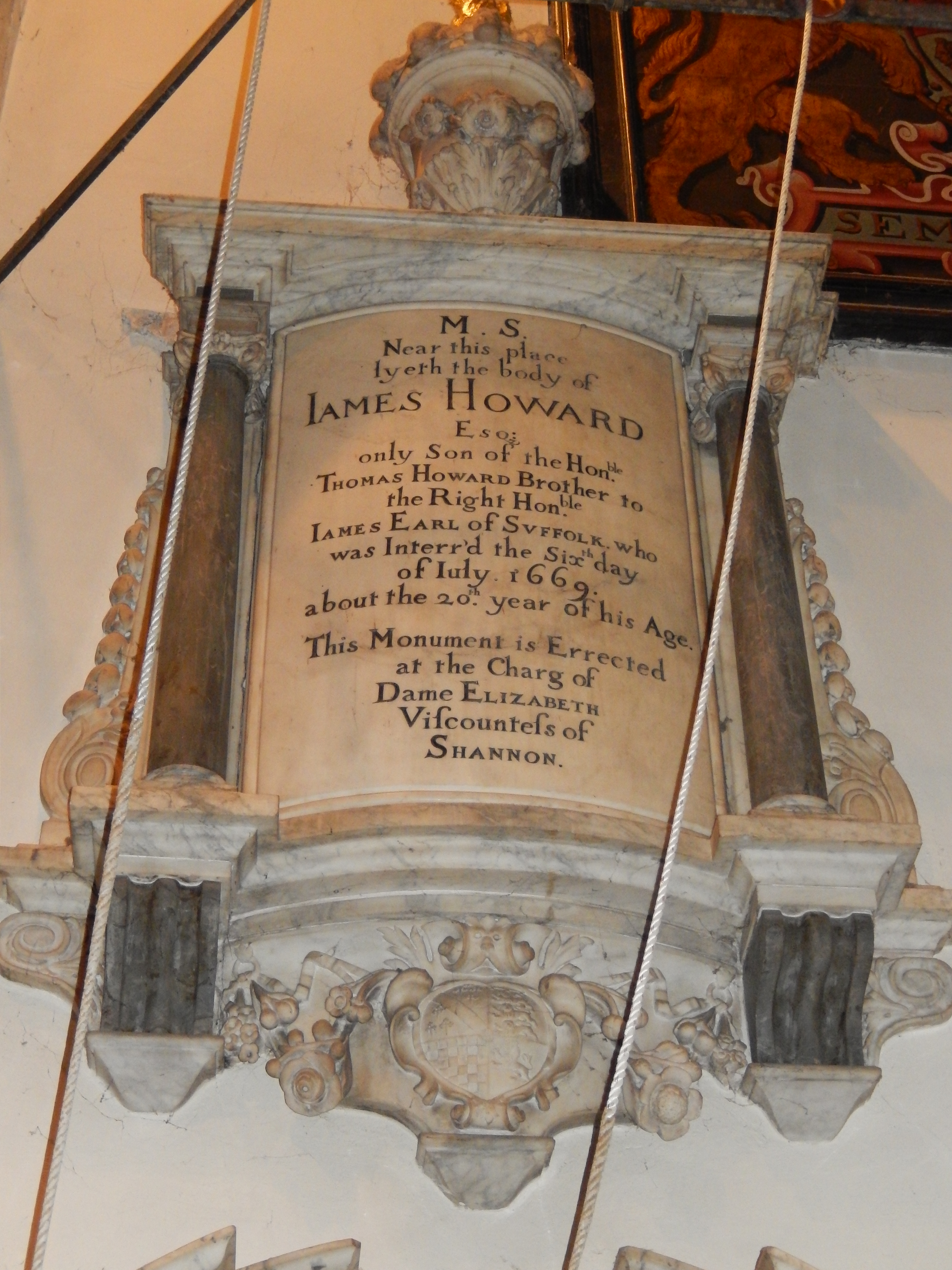
James Howard, 1669

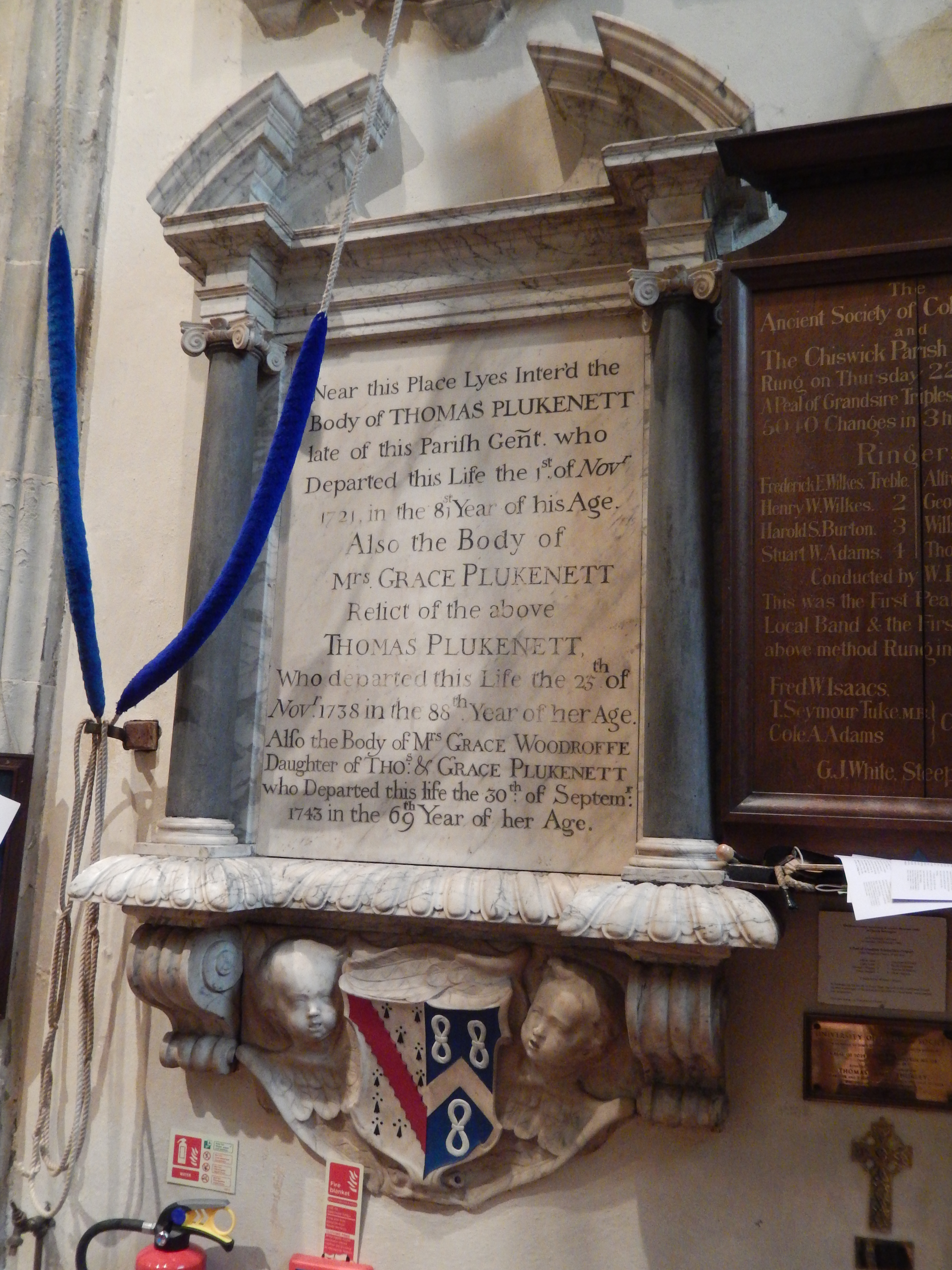
Thomas Plucknett, 1721

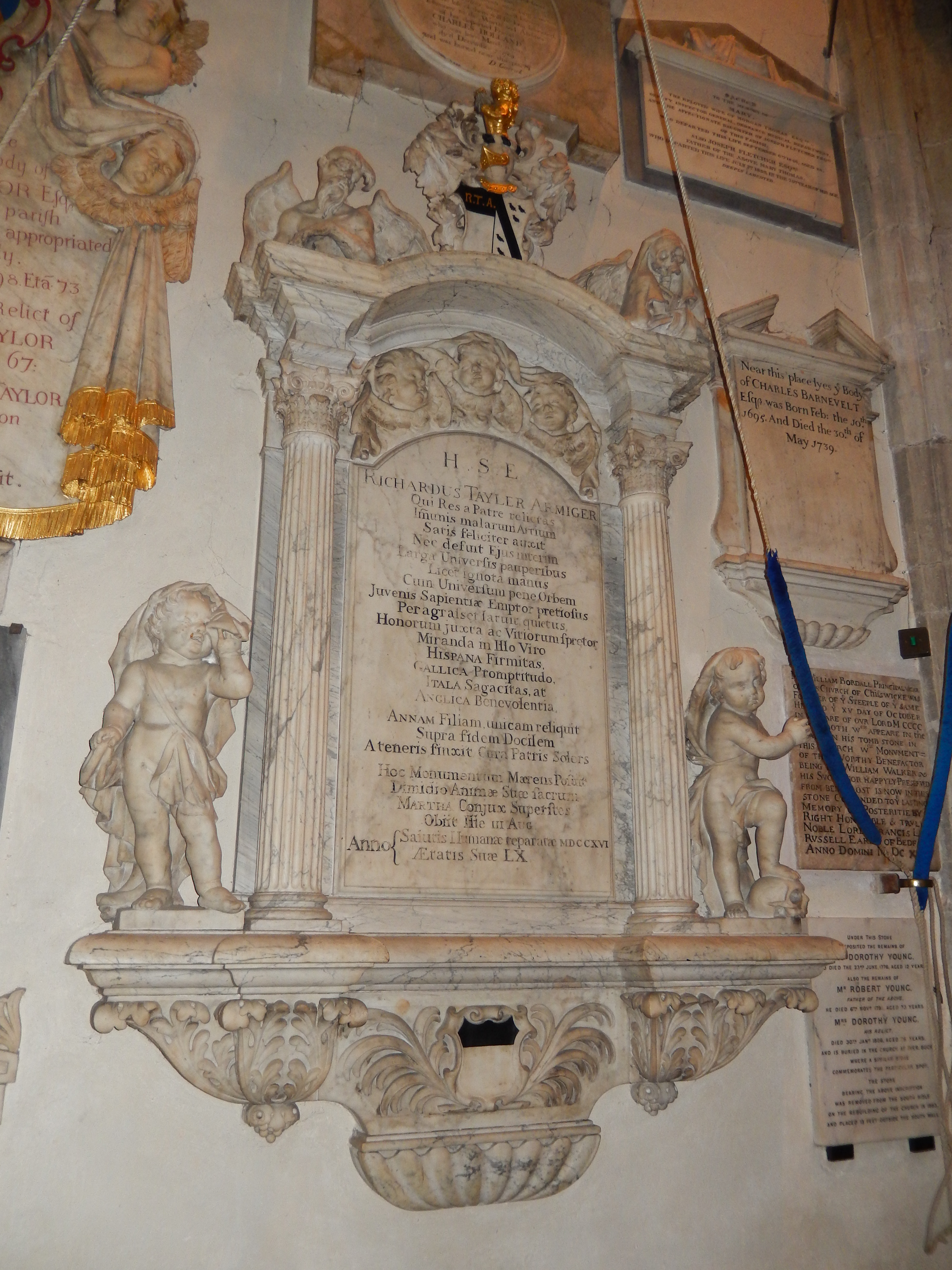
Richard Tayler, 1716

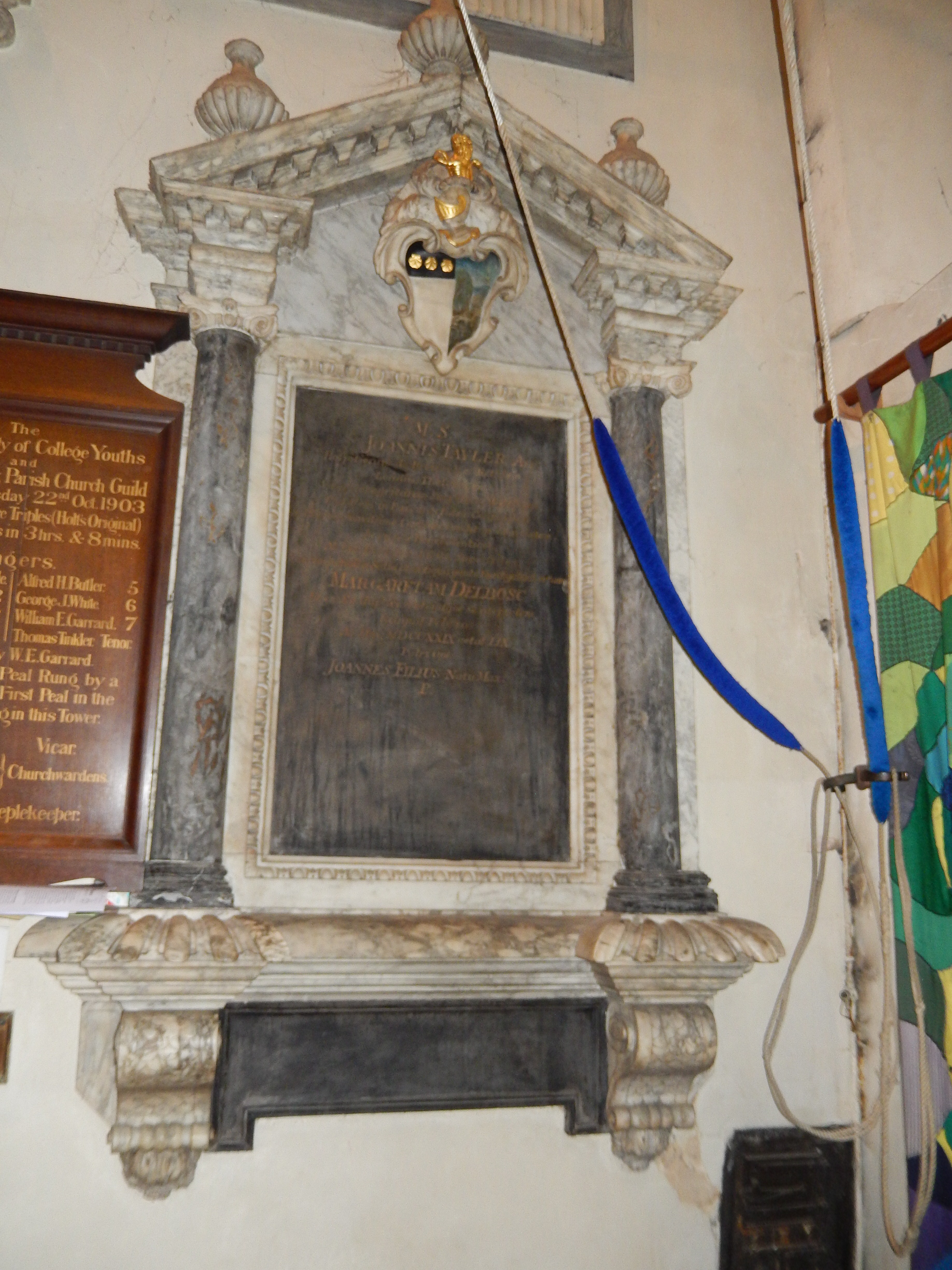
John Taylor, 1729

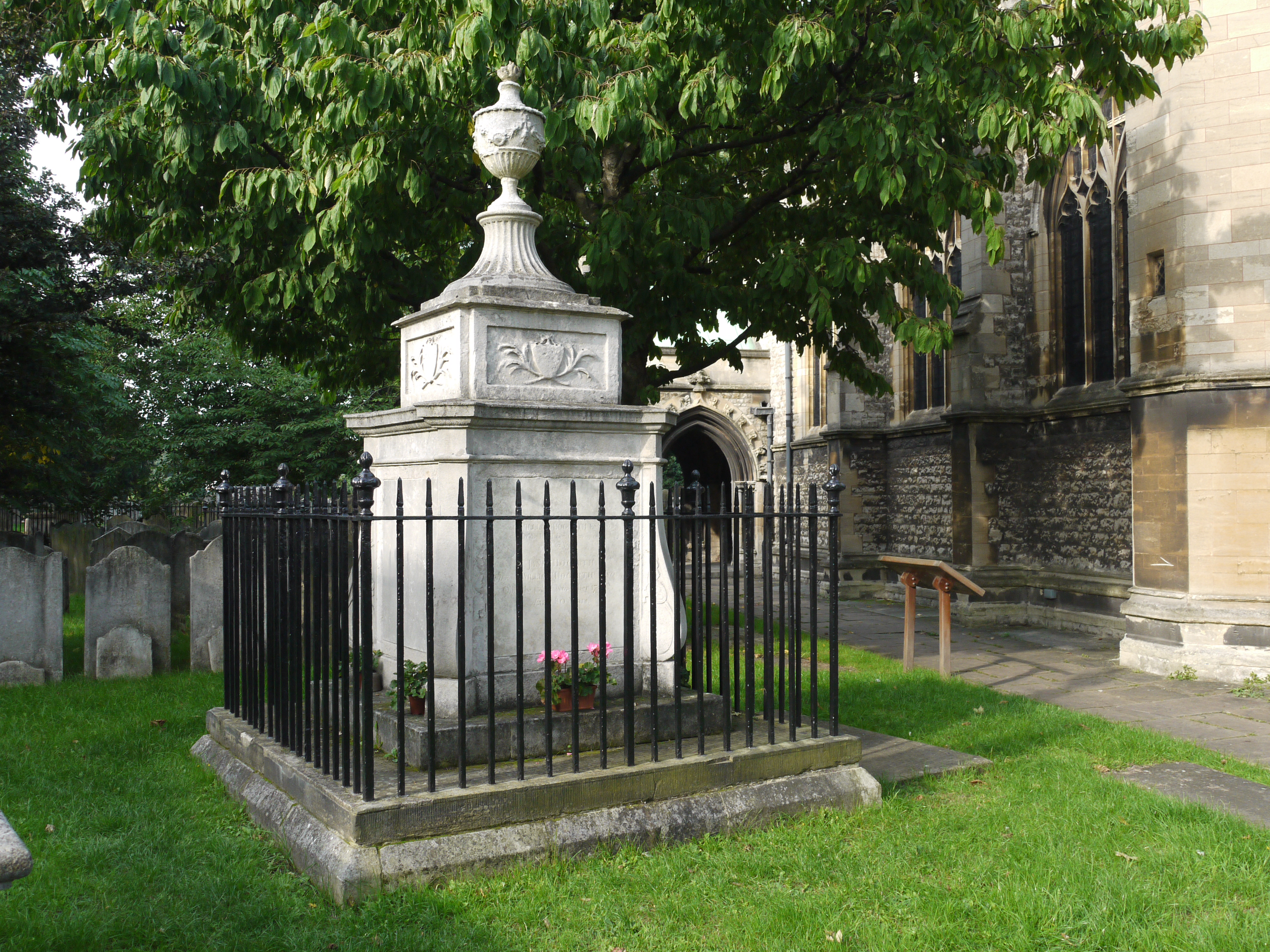
William Hogarth, 1764

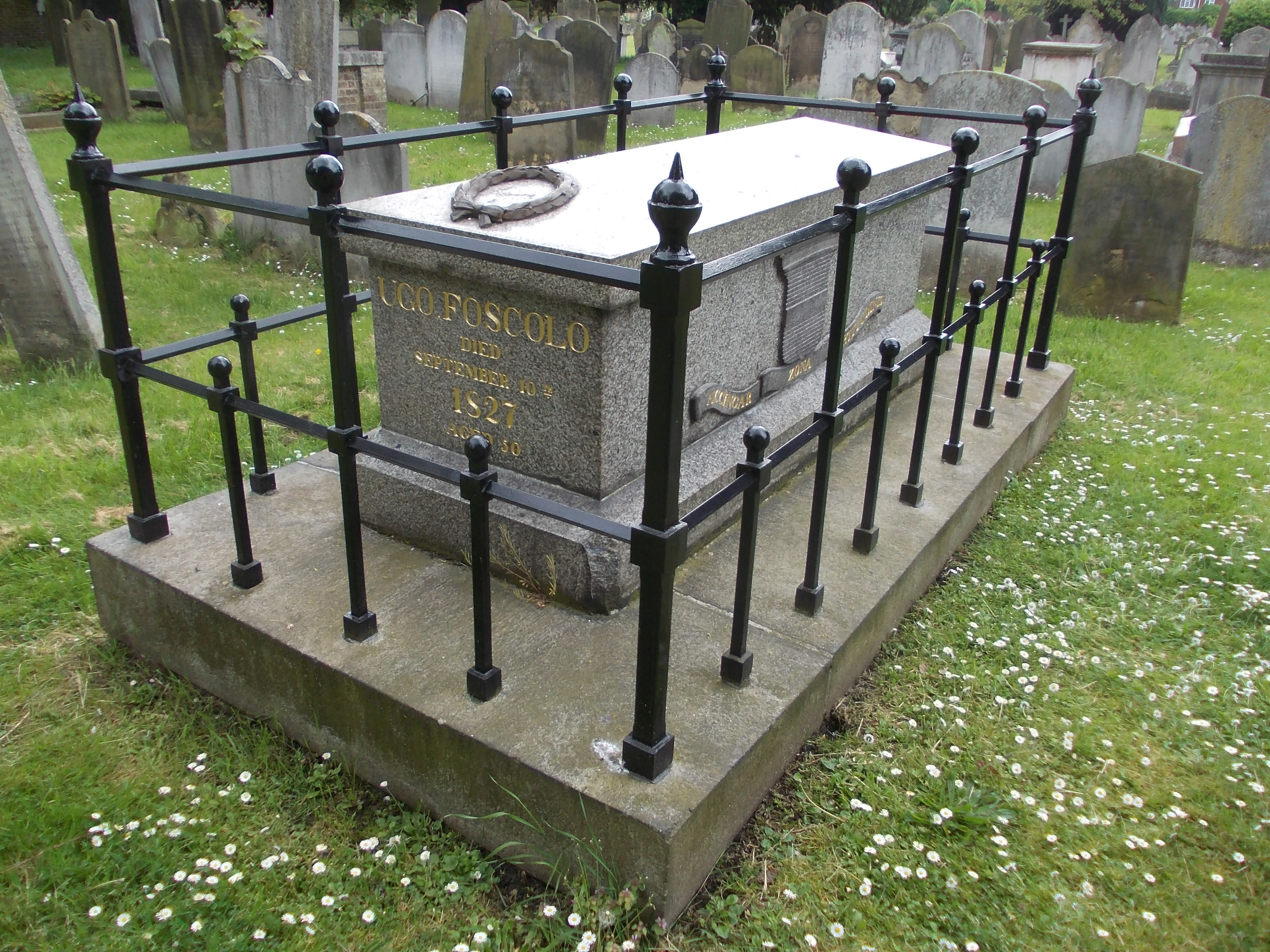
Ugo Foscolo, 1812,
reworked 1871

== See also ==
- St Michael and All Angels, Bedford Park, where Henry Smith was also involved

== Sources ==
- Clegg, Gillian (1995). Chiswick Past. Historical Publications. ISBN 0-94866-733-8.
- Phillimore, W. P. W.; Whitear, W. H., eds. (1897). Historical Collections Relating to Chiswick. 36 Essex Street, Strand, London: Phillimore & Co.
- Riall, Lucy (2007). Garibaldi: Invention of a Hero. Yale University Press. ISBN 978-0300112122.
